= Delicata squash =

Variety of winter squash

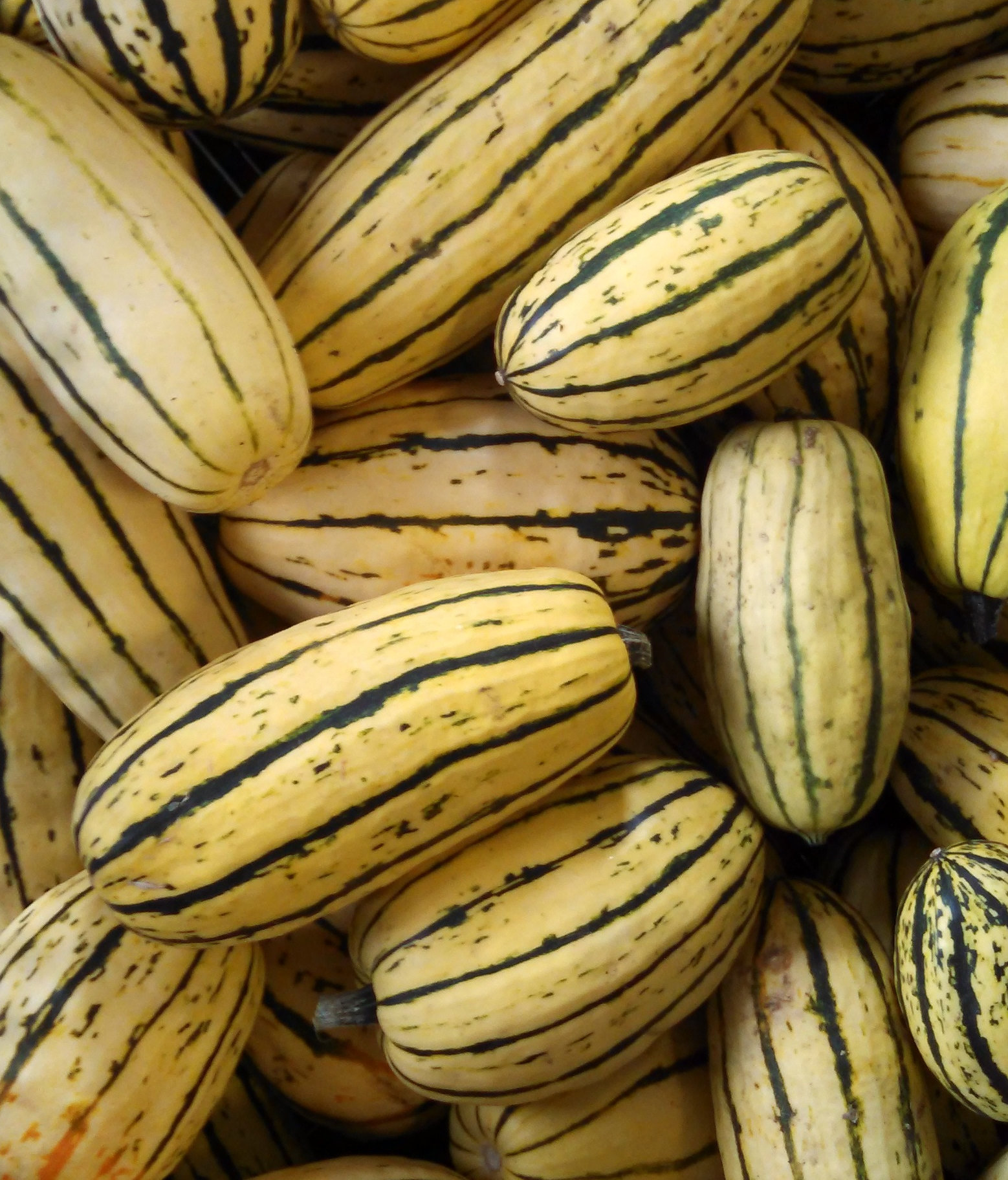
- Species: Cucurbita pepo var. pepo
- Cultivar: 'Delicata'

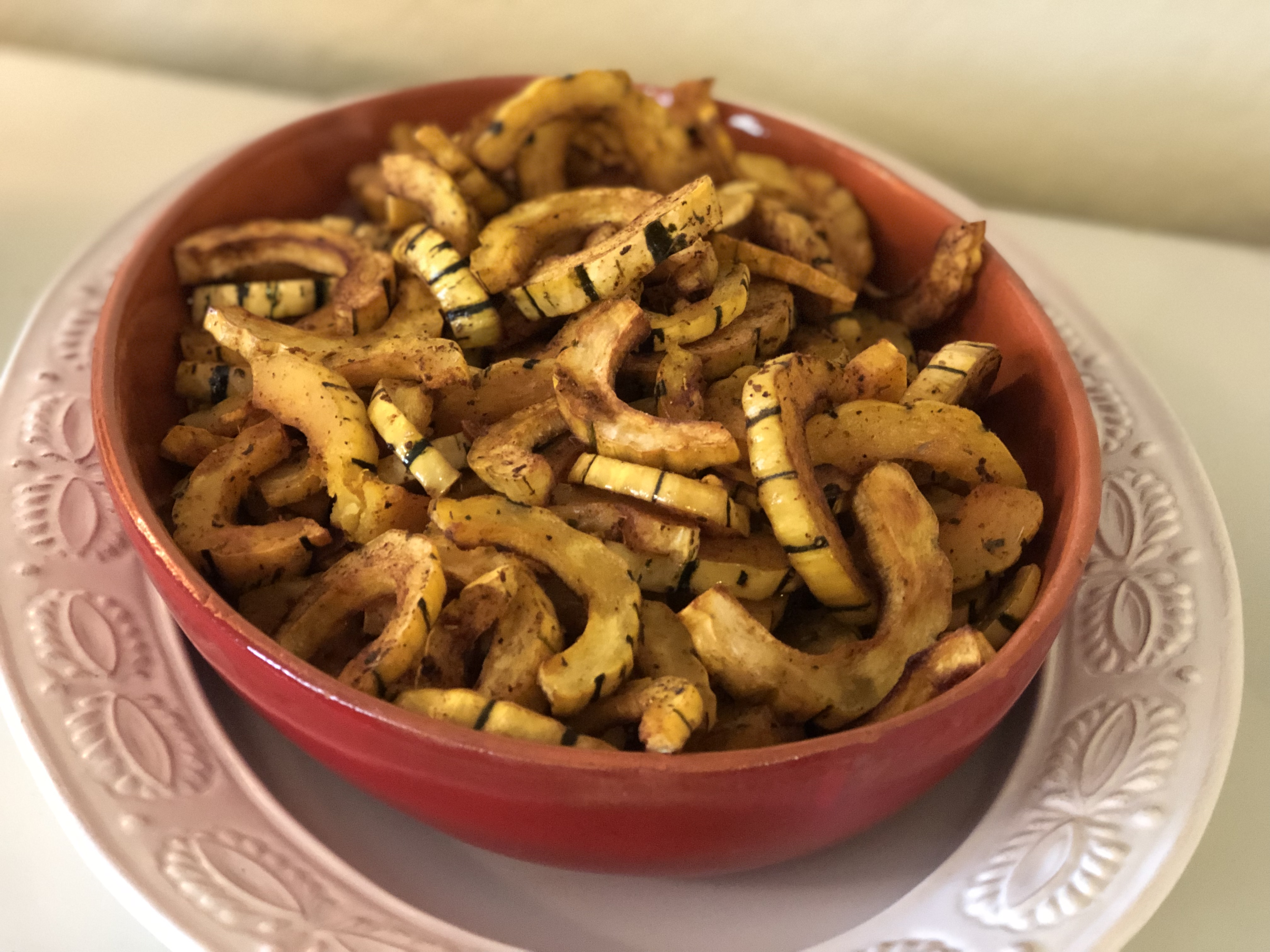
Roasted delicata squash

Delicata squash is a variety of winter squash with cylindrical fruits that are cream-colored and striped in green or orange. As its name suggests, it has characteristically a delicate rind (or skin). It is also known as peanut squash, Bohemian squash, or sweet potato squash. It is a very sweet variety with a thin, edible skin and is typically cut into half rounds and roasted. It is a cultivar of the species Cucurbita pepo, which also includes the summer squash varieties pattypan squash, zucchini, and yellow crookneck squash, as well as winter squash varieties including acorn squash, spaghetti squash, and most pumpkins used as Jack-o'-lanterns.

Delicata squash are easily grown. Seeds are started after all danger of frost has passed and the soil is warm or within three to four weeks before the predicted last frost date in the area. Seeds directly sown are placed one inch deep, five or six to a hill; hills are six feet in all direction from other hills. Roughly 105 days after germinating, delicata squash are ready to be harvested. Curing takes approximately a week in a warm, dry place that is protected from frost. Despite being classified as a winter squash, delicata does not store well over long periods like most other winter squash due to its high natural sugar content.

Delicata squash is most commonly baked, but can also be microwaved, sautéed or steamed. It may be stuffed with meat or vegetable mixtures and is known for its ease of cooking and creamy flavor and texture. The seeds of the squash are also eaten, usually after being toasted. This squash is not as rich in beta-carotene as other winter squashes, but is a good source of dietary fiber and potassium, as well as smaller amounts of vitamins C and B, magnesium, and manganese.

Indigenous to North and Central America, squash were introduced to early European settlers by Native Americans. "'Delicata' was first introduced by a seedsman in the U.S. in 1894 (Tapley et al. 1937), but a fruit very much like those of this cultivar was illustrated by Naudin (1856)." (Paris 1989). As a cultivar, it is "more or less unique and is not readily classifiable in any one modern group" (Paris 1989). The standard delicata is vinous; however, bush varieties have arisen including 'Bush Delicata', and seed sellers offer varieties with more sweetness as 'Sugar Loaf' and 'Honey Boat'.

Delicata squash almost disappeared after the Great Depression, and was not widely grown due to its susceptibility to mildew diseases. This changed in the early 2000s, when a group at Cornell University's Department of Plant Breeding, led by Molly Jahn, bred a non-hybrid open pollinated variety, Cornell's Bush Delicata, that was resistant to most known squash diseases. It won the 2002 All-America Selection (AAS), a seed-industry award, and is now the primary commercial cultivar.
