= Acorn (disambiguation) =

An acorn is the nut of an oak tree.

Acorn or ACORN may also refer to:

== Computing ==
- Acorn (software), a graphic editor for macOS
- Acorn Computers (1978–1998), a manufacturer of computers
- Acorn, the development code name for the IBM 5150 PC.
- Acorn Computers (2006), a manufacturer of Windows-only computers
- ACORN-NS, the Atlantic Canada Organization of Research Networks - Nova Scotia, computer network

== Mathematics ==
- ACORN (PRNG), a robust pseudorandom number generator (PRNG) introduced by R.S.Wikramaratna in 1989

== Companies and organizations ==
- ACORN International, a federation of community-based activist organisations, see also Association of Community Organizations for Reform Now
- Acorn DVD, a home media publisher and distributor
- Acorn Energy, a company investing in electricity and security
- Acorn Records, American record label created in 1950
- Acorn Stores, a clothing retail company
- Acorn TV, an American subscription streaming service
- Acorns (company), an American financial technology and financial services company that specializes in micro-investing and robo advice

== People ==
- Fred Acorn (born 1961), American retired football player
- Herbert H. Acorn (1868–1939), Canadian politician
- John Acorn (active 2000s), Canadian naturalist
- Milton Acorn (1923–1986), Canadian poet
- William Acorn (1915–1966), Canadian politician
- Acorn Dobson (1905–2004), British motorcycle speedway rider
- Earnie Shavers (1944–2022), American boxer who was nicknamed "The Acorn"

== Places ==
- Acorn, Arkansas, US
- Acorn, Oakland, California, US
- Acorn Community, Virginia, US

== Other ==
- Acorn (demographics), a geodemographic classification system
- Acorn nut, a domed connecting piece
- Acorn squash
- Acute Care of at-Risk Newborns (ACoRN), a Canadian neonatal resuscitation program
- Evil Acorn, a character in Conker's Pocket Tales
- The glāns (Latin pronunciation: [ˈɡlaːns]; pl. glandēs [ˈɡlan.deːs]), anatomical structure in mammals

== See also ==
- Acorns (disambiguation)
- The Acorn (disambiguation)
- Eggcorns, which got their name from a mishearing of the word acorn.
