= Edgar S. Woolard Jr. =

American businessman (1934–2023)

Edgar Smith Woolard Jr. (April 15, 1934 – December 4, 2023) was an American businessman. He was chairman and chief executive officer of DuPont from 1989 to 1995.

== Early life ==
Edgar Woolard was born on April 15, 1934, in Washington, North Carolina. He received a Bachelor of Science degree in industrial engineering from North Carolina State University in 1956. He was a lieutenant in the United States Armed Forces.

== Career ==
In 1957, he joined DuPont as an industrial engineer in the Kinston, North Carolina, plant, moving on to manufacturing and management positions in Wilmington, Delaware, Old Hickory, Tennessee and Camden, South Carolina. He was CEO and chairman from 1989 to 1995. During that time, DuPont stock increased by 160 percent.

Woolard joined the board of directors of Telex Communications in 1998, and was its chairman from March 2000 to November 2003. He has been on the board of directors of the New York Stock Exchange, Citigroup, Apple Inc., IBM and Bell Atlantic. He has also been an advisor to Acorn Energy since January 2010. He was a member of the North Carolina Textile Foundation. He was chairman of The Business Council from 1995 to 1996. He was a member of the Bretton Woods Committee.

== Philanthropy ==
Woolard was a member of the National Academy of Engineering and the American Philosophical Society. In 1988, he received the Distinguished Engineering Alumnus Award Recipient from his alma mater, NCSU. He donated more than US$1 million to the John T. Caldwell Alumni Scholarships at NCSU. The Edgar S. Woolard Chair at the University of Delaware is named after him.

== Personal life ==
Woolard was married to Peggy Harrell. They had two daughters. He lived in Wilmington, Delaware, Jupiter, Florida, and Palm Beach Gardens, Florida. Woolard died on December 4, 2023, at the age of 89.
