= Connecticut field pumpkin =

Type of pumpkin

Cucurbita pepo 'Connecticut field pumpkin'
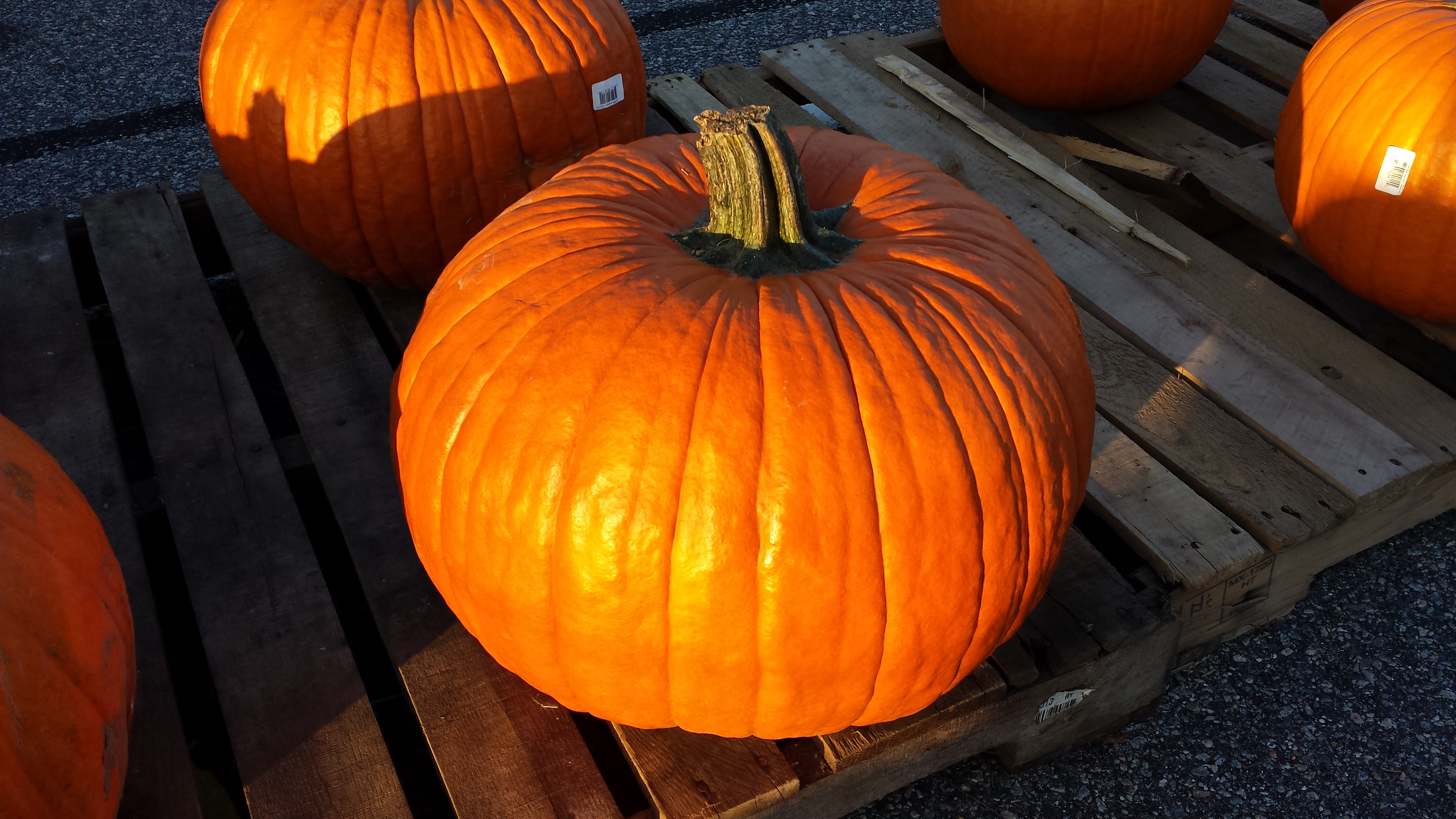
- Connecticut field pumpkin
- Genus: Cucurbita
- Species: Cucurbita pepo
- Cultivar: Connecticut field
- Marketing names: Big Tom; Canner's Supreme; Eastern Field; Georgia Field; Lake Shore
- Origin: Connecticut

Connecticut field pumpkins are a type of pumpkin (Cucurbita pepo) first attested in the 16th century. They are one of the oldest varieties of pumpkin in existence and are known as an heirloom plant. One of the most popular Halloween pumpkins, Connecticut field pumpkins are commonly used for autumn decorations and jack-o'-lanterns; a strain of Connecticut field pumpkins have been described as "the original commercial jack-o'-lantern pumpkin". Due to the variety's appearance and growth process, it is considered to be well-suited for ornamental use. It also has culinary uses and was used for medicinal purposes by Native Americans prior to European contact.

== Background ==
The Connecticut field pumpkin is of the species Cucurbita pepo, and is the most widely-grown member of the Cucurbita genus of gourds. The Cucurbita pepo group includes other pumpkins, winter squash, summer squash, acorns, and ornamental gourds. It is a fruit which is sensitive to frost. The pumpkin plant has unisexual flowers and vines and large leaves. The Connecticut field pumpkin is similar to winter squash, which was grown by Native Americans in the pre-Columbian era. The name "Connecticut field" references the area where the ancestral variety was found. The variety is colloquially known by various other names, such as Big Tom, Canner's Supreme, Eastern Field, Georgia Field, and Lake Shore. The Connecticut field pumpkin has been grown since before the American Revolutionary War.

== History ==
Native Americans in the United States used the pumpkins in food and the making of medicine. They dried and stored pumpkins for use in the winter and they used them to make bread and other foods. The Cherokee tribe ate the seeds to cure internal parasites and other native American tribes used pumpkin as a diuretic. American colonists soon learned the significance and they learned how to best grow it from the Native Americans.

Field pumpkins were seen as early as the middle of the 16th century by the French explorer Jacques Cartier. Thomas Dunlap produced a catalog in 1752 that advertised Connecticut field pumpkin seeds: a quart was offered for US$0.375 (equivalent to $12.35 in 2025). In 1863 four distinct cultivars of this type of pumpkin were identified: Canada, Common Yellow, Connecticut field, and Long Yellow. The field pumpkin is typically traced back to the European colonization of the Americas. Because of its long use, it is considered to be an heirloom plant.

== Characteristics ==
The pumpkins have many shapes and sizes but they are commonly round. The Connecticut field pumpkin is 15 to 25 pounds (6.8 to 11.3 kg) in size and it is round, and orange, with smooth, slightly ribbed skin.

The Howden pumpkin was developed by John Howden and it is a strain selected from Connecticut field pumpkins for improved production and uniformity of fruits: it is described as "the original commercial jack-o'-lantern pumpkin".

== Cultivation and harvest ==
The Native Americans taught the colonists that they would get higher yields per acre if they planted potatoes or corn in the same field as the pumpkins. In 1906, the South Dakota State Horticultural Society recommended that six seeds be planted within hills of dirt approximately 8 ft (2.4 m) apart. After the plants grew into seedlings, the horticultural society recommended that the seedlings be thinned to just two plants per hill. The 1917 Cyclopedia of American Agriculture recommended that the variety be planted in sandy loam soil without other crops. They advised farmers to use manure to fertilize and said that 3 lb (1.4 kg) of seeds were needed to plant 1 acre (0.40 ha). A good crop was considered to be two pumpkins per vine. One dangerous pest that can destroy the crop is the striped cucumber beetle.

The recommended time to harvest them is when there is no green visible on the pumpkin. Farmers are taught to leave a 3 4 inch stem on the pumpkin and to cut them with shears so that they do not break the stem. The Connecticut field pumpkin has a 110-day growing period from planting to harvest.

== Uses ==
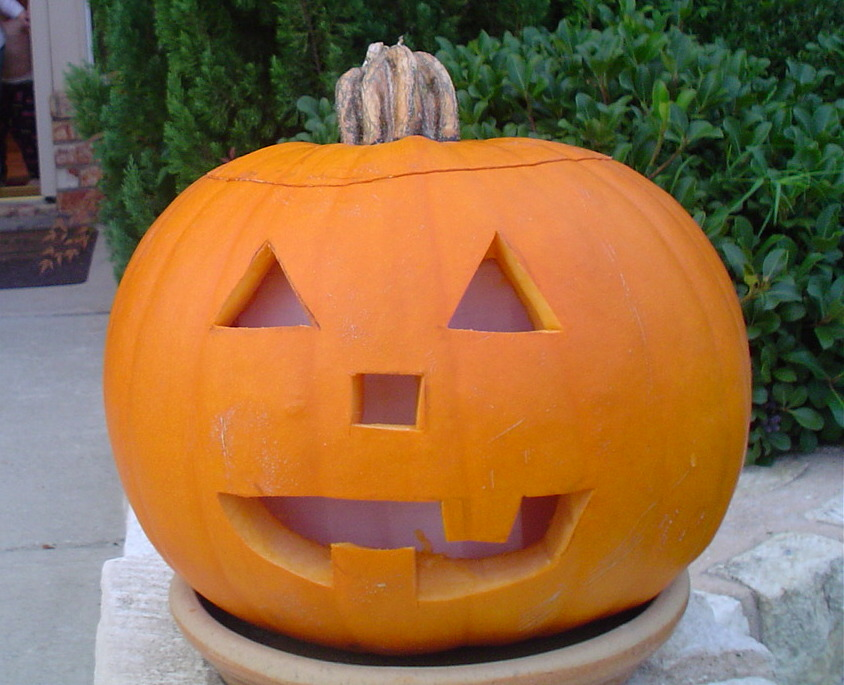
Connecticut field pumpkins are traditionally used to create Jack-o'-lanterns.

The Connecticut field pumpkin is considered to be the standard general-purpose Halloween pumpkin. It is the variety most often selected for carving jack-o'-lanterns, and is widely considered to be the most popular Halloween pumpkin. Unlike many pumpkin varieties, the Connecticut field pumpkin grows upright. This gives them flat rather than rounded bottoms, which some commentators believe improves their usability for carving and displaying jack-o'-lanterns.

The Connecticut field pumpkin also has culinary uses; it is one of the most popular pumpkin varieties for home canning, alongside the Dickinson, Kentucky Field, and Golden Delicious pumpkins. The variety can be eaten fresh or canned, but is considered less palatable than culinary pumpkin varieties. The inside of the pumpkin is stringy and thick which makes it less desirable for eating.

The variety is also used by ranchers as feed for livestock. The pulp is rich in carotenoids and the seeds are a source of fatty acid. The flowers and the pulp are both edible. Because of its many uses, the variety is a common choice for home gardeners.

== Economic importance ==
In the United States, all fifty states produce pumpkins. In 2020 and 2021, Illinois led the nation in pumpkin production with 15,900 acres (6,400 ha) devoted to pumpkin growing. In 2021 alone, Illinois produced 652 million pounds of pumpkins. States with 4,500 to 7,400 acres (3,000 ha) devoted to pumpkin growing include: in the west, California; midwestern states Indiana and Michigan; and southern states Texas and Virginia. Prices range from US$35 to US$250 per 1000 pounds. The growers mainly produce ornamental or jack-o'-lantern pumpkins. In addition to North America, pumpkins are grown in Africa, Europe, Asia and South America. Annual pumpkin production likely surpasses 20 million tonnes.
