= Acorns =

Acorns may refer to:

- Plural of acorn, the nut of the oak tree
- Acorns (company), a micro-investing and robo-advisor financial company
- Acorns (suit), one of the four suits in German pattern playing cards
- Acorns Children's Hospice, a charity in England
- Springfield Acorns, a minor league American football team in Springfield, Massachusetts

== See also ==
- Acorn (disambiguation)
- Little Acorns (disambiguation)
