= Compilospecies =

A compilospecies is a genetically aggressive species which acquires the heredities of a closely related sympatric species by means of hybridisation and comprehensive introgression. The concept has in practice been applied to plants. The target species may be incorporated to the point of despeciation, rendering it extinct. This type of genetic aggression is associated with species in newly disturbed habitats (such as pioneering species), weed species and domestication. They can be diploid or polyploid, as well as sexual or primarily asexual. The term compilospecies derives from the Latin word compilo, which means to seize, to collect, to rob or to plunder. A proposed explanation for the existence of such a species with weak reproductive barriers and frequent introgression is that it allows for genetic variation. An increase in the gene pool through viable hybrids can facilitate new phenotypes and the colonisation of novel habitats. The concept of compilospecies is not frequent in scientific literature and may not be fully regarded by the biological community as a true evolutionary concept, especially due to low supporting evidence.

== History ==
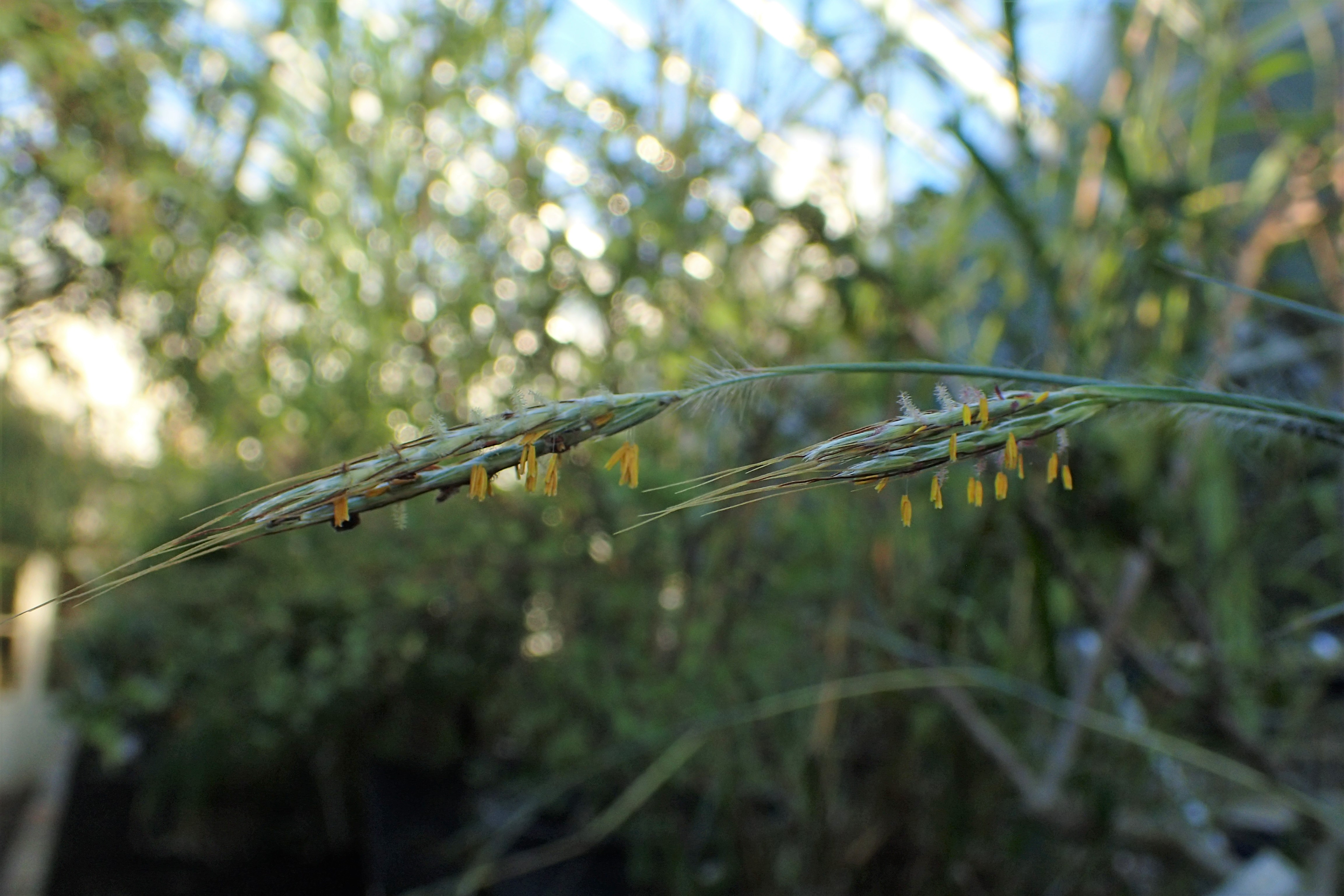
Bothriochloa bladhii (Bothriochloa intermedia), an example of a compilospecies

Compilospecies were first described by Harlan and de Wet in 1962, who examined a wide range of grasses and other species such as Bothriochloa intermedia, otherwise known as Australian bluestem grass. B. intermedia was found to introgress heavily with neighboring sympatric grass species and even genera, particularly in geographically restricted areas. The species itself is of hybrid origin, containing genetic material from five or more different grass species. Harlan and de Wet examined the interactions between the genera Bothriochloa, Dichanthium and Capillipedium - an apomictic complex of grasses from the tribe Andropogoneae - and used the cytogenetic model of these as a basis for the compilospecies concept. Species within these genera exhibit both sexual and asexual reproduction, high heterozygosity, ploidies from 2x to 6x, and gene flow between bordering populations as evidence of ongoing introgression. However, this gene flow is only made possible in the presence of B. intermedia, which introgression moves towards, and the absence of which keeps the other species reproductively isolated. B. intermedia is identified as the compilospecies in this model.

=== Further examples ===
Other researched examples of compilospecies include;

- Helianthus (sunflowers)
- Draba (whitlow-grasses)
- Armeria villosa
