= Little Acorns =

Little Acorns may refer to:

- "Little Acorns", song by Arthur Kent
- "Little Acorns", song by The White Stripes from Elephant 2003

== See also ==
- Acorns (disambiguation)
