= Straightneck squash =

Type of summer squash that is usually yellow-colored

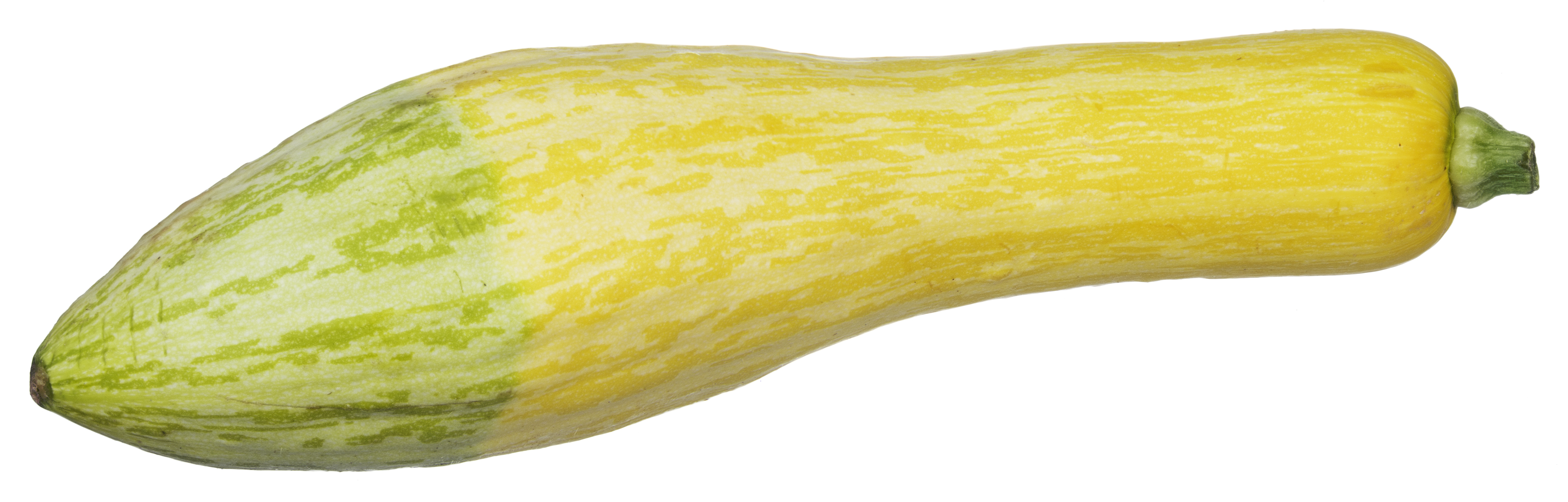
- A yellow summer squash
- Species: Cucurbita pepo
- Cultivar: C. pepo var. recticollis
- Origin: United States

Straightneck squash is a cultivated variety of Cucurbita pepo grown as a type of summer squash that is usually yellow-colored. It is also known as yellow squash, though other squashes, such as crookneck squash, may also be known by that name. It has mildly sweet and watery flesh, and thin tender skins that can be left on the fruit for many types of recipes. It was almost certainly domesticated in the eastern United States, although other variants of the same species (zucchini and pumpkin) were domesticated in Mesoamerica. This squash grows on vined plants reaching 60–90 cm (2.0–3.0 ft) in height that thrive in mild weather. It is well known as an item in American cooking where it is fried, microwaved, steamed, boiled, or baked. It is often used in recipes interchangeably with zucchini. A good yellow summer squash will be small and firm with tender skin free of blemishes and bruising. It is available all year long in some regions, but is at its peak from early through late summer. One similar inedible C. pepo variety is C. pepo var. ovifera.
