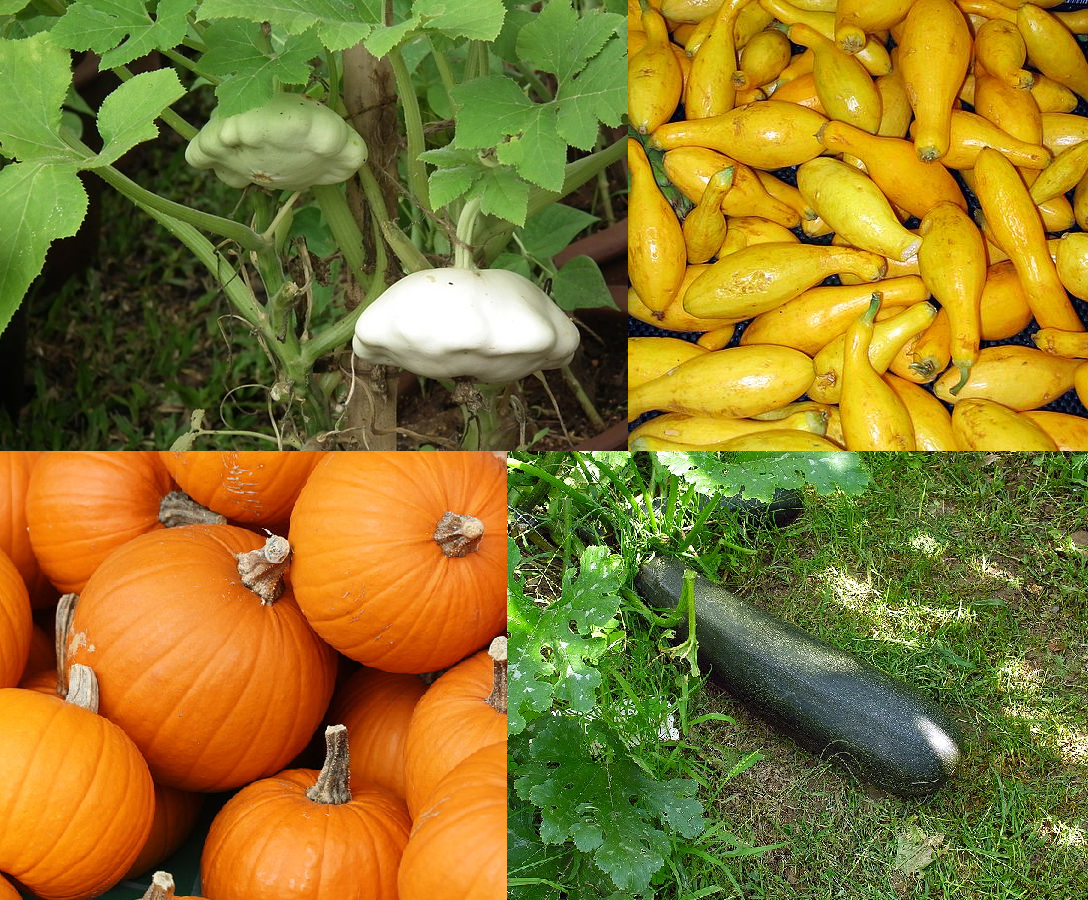
- Assorted cultivars, from top-left, clockwise: pattypan squash, yellow summer squash, a large zucchini (or marrow), and pumpkins

Conservation status
- Least Concern (IUCN 3.1)

Scientific classification
- Kingdom: Plantae
- Clade: Tracheophytes
- Clade: Angiosperms
- Clade: Eudicots
- Clade: Rosids
- Order: Cucurbitales
- Family: Cucurbitaceae
- Genus: Cucurbita
- Species: C. pepo

Binomial name
- Cucurbita pepo L.

Synonyms
- List: Citrullus variegatus Schrad. ex M.Roem.; Cucumis pepo (L.) Dumort.; Cucumis zapallo Steud.; Cucurbita aurantia Willd.; Cucurbita ceratoceras Haberle ex Mart.; Cucurbita clodiensis Nocca; Cucurbita courgero Ser.; Cucurbita elongata Bean ex Schrad.; Cucurbita esculenta Gray; Cucurbita fastuosa Salisb.; Cucurbita grisea M.Roem.; Cucurbita hybrida Bertol. ex Naudin; Cucurbita lignosa Mill.; Cucurbita mammeata Molina; Cucurbita mammosa J.F.Gmel.; Cucurbita marsupiiformis Haberle ex M.Roem. [Invalid]; Cucurbita melopepo L.; Cucurbita oblonga Link; Cucurbita polymorpha Duchesne; Cucurbita pomiformis M.Roem.; Cucurbita pyridaris Duchesne ex Poir.; Cucurbita pyxidaris DC.; Cucurbita subverrucosa Willd.; Cucurbita succado Nägeli ex Naudin; Cucurbita succedo Arn.; Cucurbita tuberculosa Schrad.; Cucurbita urnigera Schrad.; Cucurbita variegata Steud.; Cucurbita venosa Descourt.; Cucurbita verrucosa L.; Pepo citrullus Sageret; Pepo potiron Sageret; Pepo vulgaris Moench

= Cucurbita pepo =

Species of flowering plant yielding squash and pumpkin

Cucurbita pepo is a cultivated plant of the genus Cucurbita. It yields varieties of winter squash and pumpkin, but the most widespread varieties belong to the subspecies Cucurbita pepo subsp. pepo, called summer squash.

It has been domesticated in the Americas for thousands of years, from where it was spread by early colonisers to Europe and later across the rest of the Old World in the context of the Columbian Exchange. Some authors maintain that C. pepo is derived from C. texana, while others suggest that C. texana is merely feral C. pepo. They have a wide variety of uses, especially as a food source. C. pepo seems more closely related to C. fraterna, though disagreements exist about the exact nature of that connection, too.

It is a host species for the melonworm moth, the squash vine borer, and the pickleworm. They are also the preferred pollen source for squash bees, which are the primary pollinators in the Americas.

== Description ==
Due to their varied genetic background, members of C. pepo vary widely in appearance, primarily in regards to their fruits. The plants are typically 30–76 centimetres (1–2 1/2 ft) high and 61–91 cm (2–3 ft) wide, with yellow flowers. Within C. pepo, the pumpkins, scallops, and possibly crooknecks are ancient and were domesticated separately. The domesticated species have larger fruits and larger yet fewer seeds. Parthenocarpy is known to occur in certain cultivars of C. pepo.

The leaves have three to five lobes and are 20–35 centimetres (8–14 in) wide. All the subspecies, varieties, and cultivars are conspecific and interfertile.

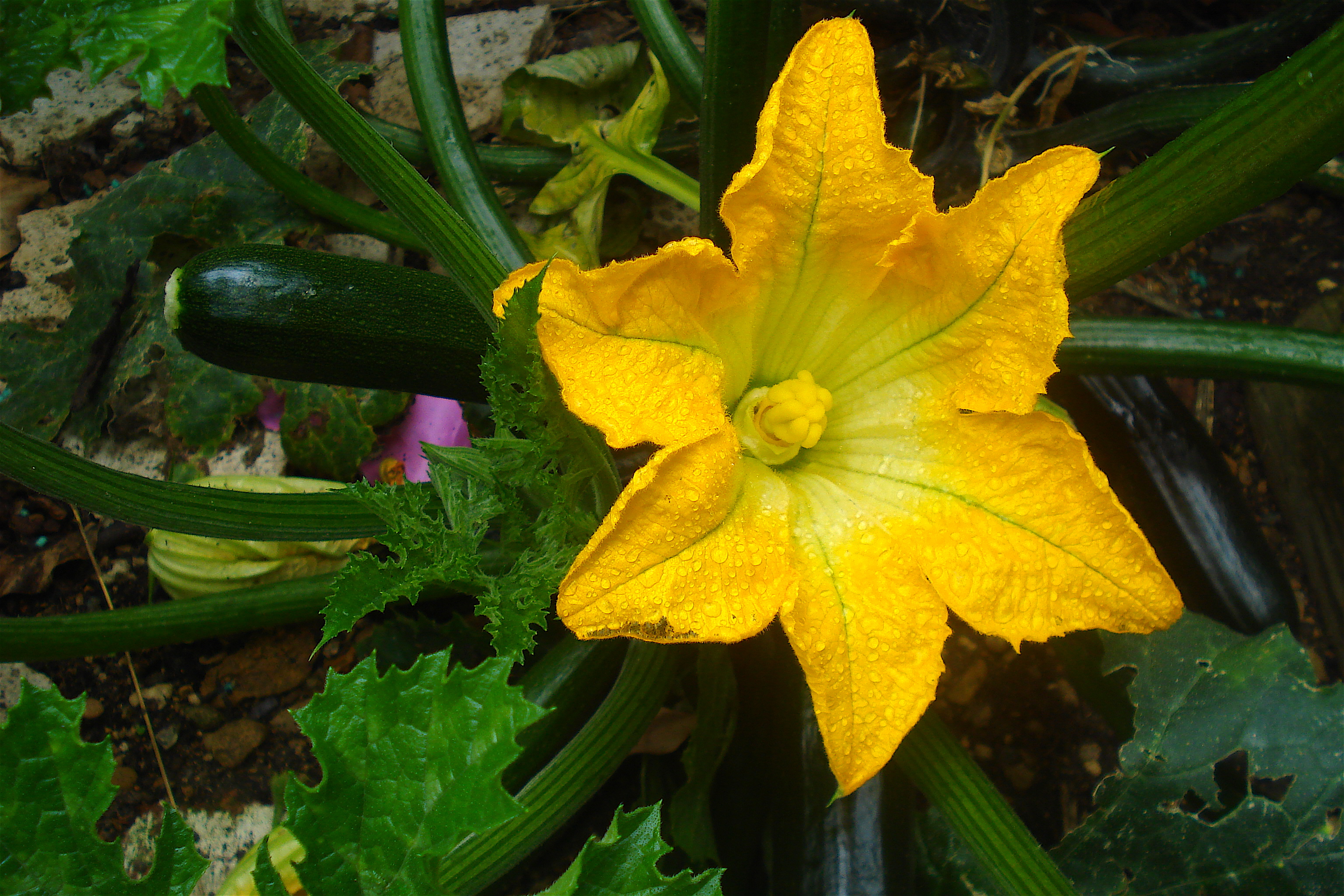
Female flower of zucchini

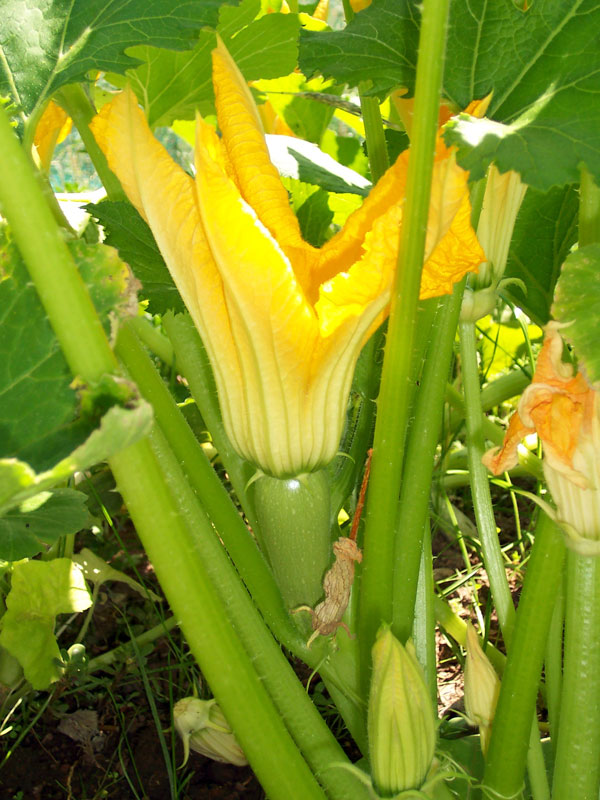
Female flower near the time of fertilization

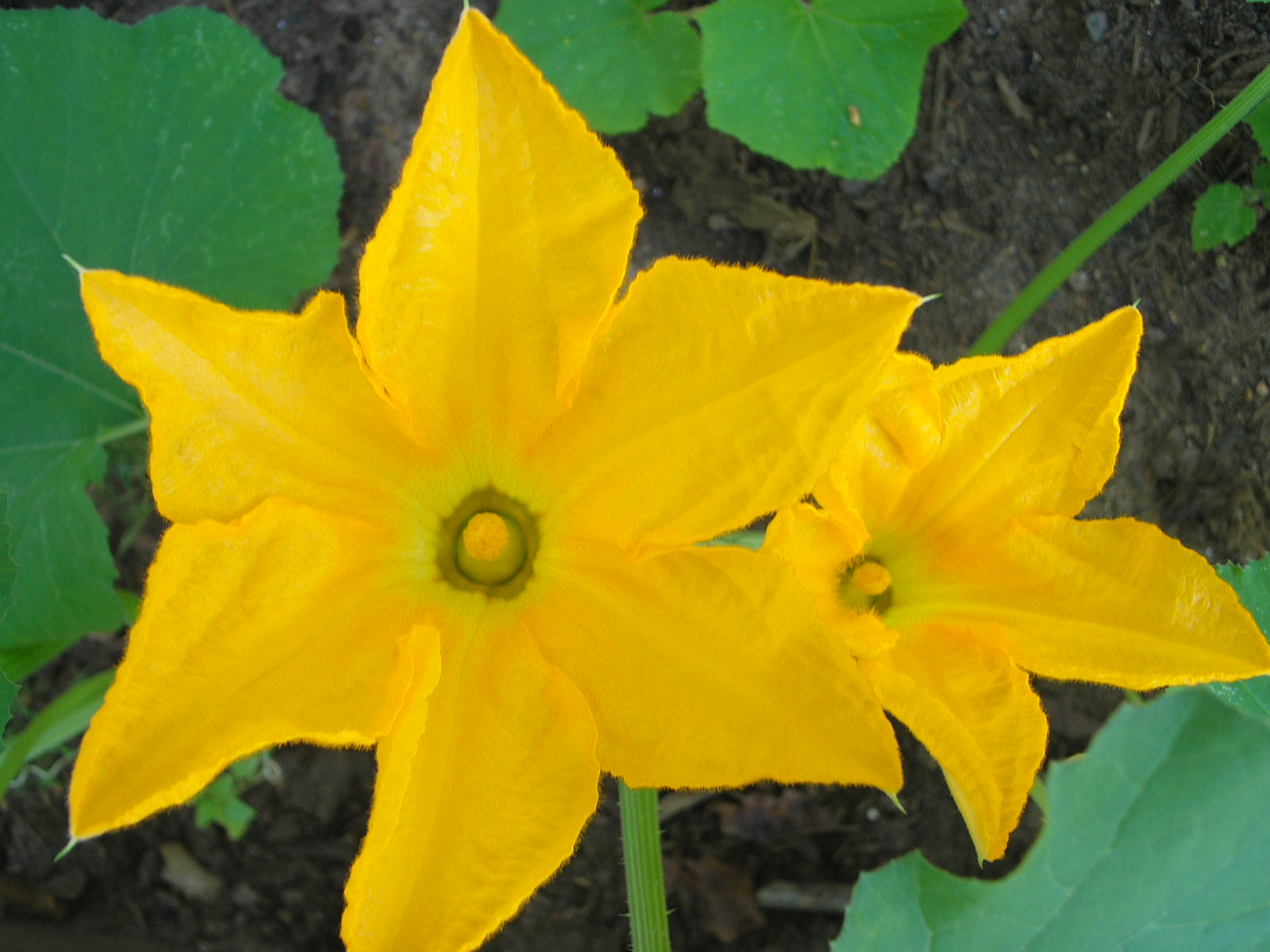
Two male flowers

== Taxonomy ==
=== Origin and history ===
C. pepo is one of the oldest, if not the oldest domesticated species. The oldest known locations are in southern Mexico in Oaxaca 8,000–10,000 years ago and Ocampo, Tamaulipas, Mexico about 7,000 years ago.

Before the arrival of Europeans, C. pepo, along with C. moschata, had been carried over all parts of North America where they could be grown. The ancient territory of C. pepo extended north into Texas and up the Greater Mississippi River Valley into Illinois and east to Florida, and possibly even to Maine. It is one of several plants cultivated in prehistoric North America as part of the Eastern Agricultural Complex. It is known to have appeared in Missouri at least 4,000 years ago. Some varieties grow in arid regions and some in moist regions. Many of these peoples, particularly in the west, still grow a diversity of hardy squashes and pumpkins not to be found in commercial markets. Still, neither C. pepo nor C. moschata had been carried into South America as had beans, which originated in the same general region.

Debates about the origin of C. pepo have been going on since at least 1857. Recent biosystematic investigations indicate two distinct domestication events in two different areas: one in Mexico and one in the eastern United States, with C. pepo subsp. fraterna and C. pepo subsp. texana, respectively, as the predominant ancestral species from a phylogenetic perspective.

=== Subdivision ===
The morphological differences within the species C. pepo are so vast that its various subspecies and cultivars have been misidentified as totally separate species. These vast differences are rooted in its widespread geographic distribution.

Several taxa have been proposed, but as of 2012 none has been universally accepted. In 2002, the taxa conventions proposed by Decker-Walters were:

- C. pepo subsp. pepo - cultivated pumpkins, marrows, the orange gourds ("Orange Ball" and "Orange Warted")
- C. pepo subsp. ovifera var. ovifera – cultivated crooknecks, scallops, acorns, most ornamental gourds
- C. pepo subsp. ovifera var. ozarkana – wild populations in the Greater Mississippi Valley and Ozark Plateau
- C. pepo subsp. ovifera var. texana – wild populations in Texas
- C. pepo subsp. fraterna – wild populations in northeastern Mexico

A 2003 study recognized three subspecies:

- Cucurbita pepo subsp. fraterna
- Cucurbita pepo subsp. pepo
- Cucurbita pepo subsp. texana

In 1986, botanist Paris proposed a taxonomy of C. pepo consisting of eight edible groups based on their basic shape. All but a few C. pepo cultivars can be included in these groups. These eight edible cultivated varieties of C. pepo vary widely in shape and color, and one inedible cultivated variety:

Cultivar group	Botanical name	Image	Description
Acorn	C. pepo var. turbinata		winter squash, both a shrubby and creeping plant, obovoid or conical shape, pointed at the apex and with longitudinal grooves, thus resembling a spinning top, ex: Acorn squash
Cocozelle	C. pepo var. longa		summer squash, long round slender fruit that is slightly bulbous at the apex, similar to fastigata, ex: Cocozelle von tripolis
Crookneck	C. pepo var. torticollia		summer squash, shrubby plant, with yellow, golden, or white fruit which is long and curved at the end and generally has a verrucose (wart-covered) rind, ex: Yellow crookneck squash
Pumpkin	C. pepo var. pepo		winter squash, creeping plant, round, oblate, or oval shape and round or flat on the ends, ex: Pumpkin; includes C. pepo subsp. pepo var. styriaca, used for Styrian pumpkin seed oil
Scallop	C. pepo var. clypeata; called C. melopepo by Linnaeus		summer squash, prefers half-shrubby habitat, flattened or slightly discoidal shape, with undulations or equatorial edges, ex: pattypan squash
Straightneck	C. pepo var. recticollis		summer squash, shrubby plant, with yellow or golden fruit and verrucose rind, similar to var. torticollia but a stem end that narrows, ex: Yellow summer squash
Vegetable marrow	C. pepo var. fastigata		summer and winter squashes, creeper traits and a semi-shrub, cream to dark green color, short round fruit with a slightly broad apex, ex: Spaghetti squash (a winter variety)
Zucchini (US); Courgette (UK, IE)	C. pepo var. cylindrica		summer squash, presently the most common group of cultivars, origin is recent (19th century), semi-shrubby, cylindrical fruit with a mostly consistent diameter, similar to fastigata, ex: Zucchini
Ornamental gourds	C. pepo var. ovifera		non-edible, field pumpkins closely related to C. texana, vine habitat, thin stems, small leaves, three sub-groups: C. pepo var. ovifera (egg-shaped, pear-shaped), C. pepo var. aurantia (orange color), and C. pepo var. verrucosa (round warty gourds), ornamental gourds found in Texas and called var. texana and ornamental gourds found outside of Texas (Illinois, Missouri, Arkansas, Oklahoma, and Louisiana) are called var. ozarkana.

Random amplified polymorphic DNA has proven useful in sorting out the relationships of the C. pepo species, varieties, and cultivars, showing that few, if any, modern cultivars have their origins with C. texana. They are associated with C. fraterna or a still-unknown ancestral specimen in southern Mexico.

It has been proposed that the domesticated forms of C. pepo are a compilospecies of C. pepo subsp. fraterna and C. pepo subsp. texana. A 1989 study on the origins and development of C. pepo suggested that the original wild specimen was a small round fruit and that the modern pumpkin is its direct descendant. This investigation proposed that the crookneck, ornamental gourd, and scallop are early variants, and that the acorn is a cross between the scallop and pumpkin.

Based on genetic allele analysis, two distinct groups occur within domesticated C. pepo: pumpkin, calabaza, criolla, and marrow squash are in one; and ornamental gourds, crookneck, acorn, scallop, and a few others in the second one. C. pepo subsp. fraterna is genetically closer to the first group and C. pepo subsp. texana is genetically closer to the second group.

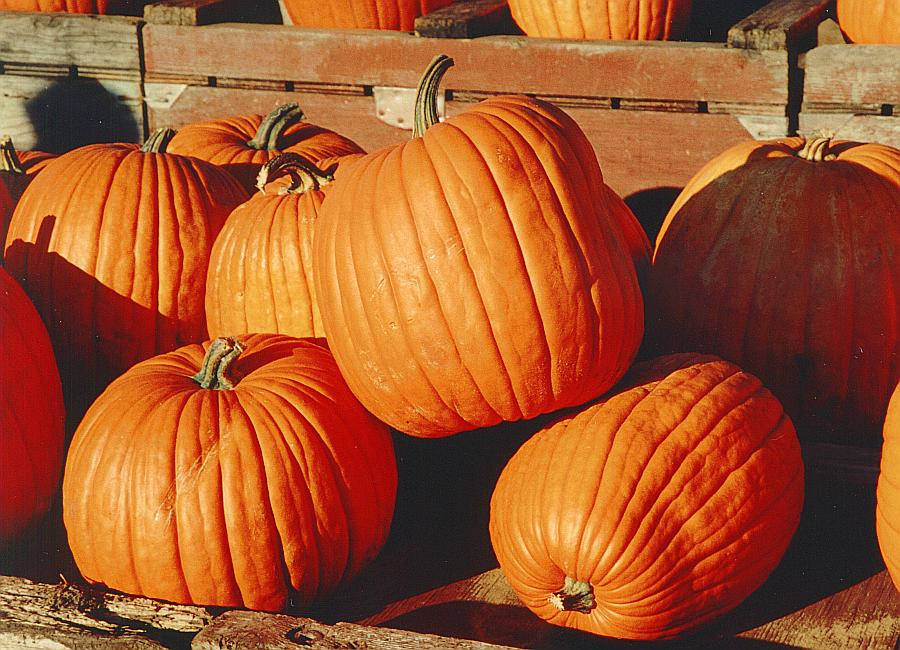
Connecticut field pumpkin

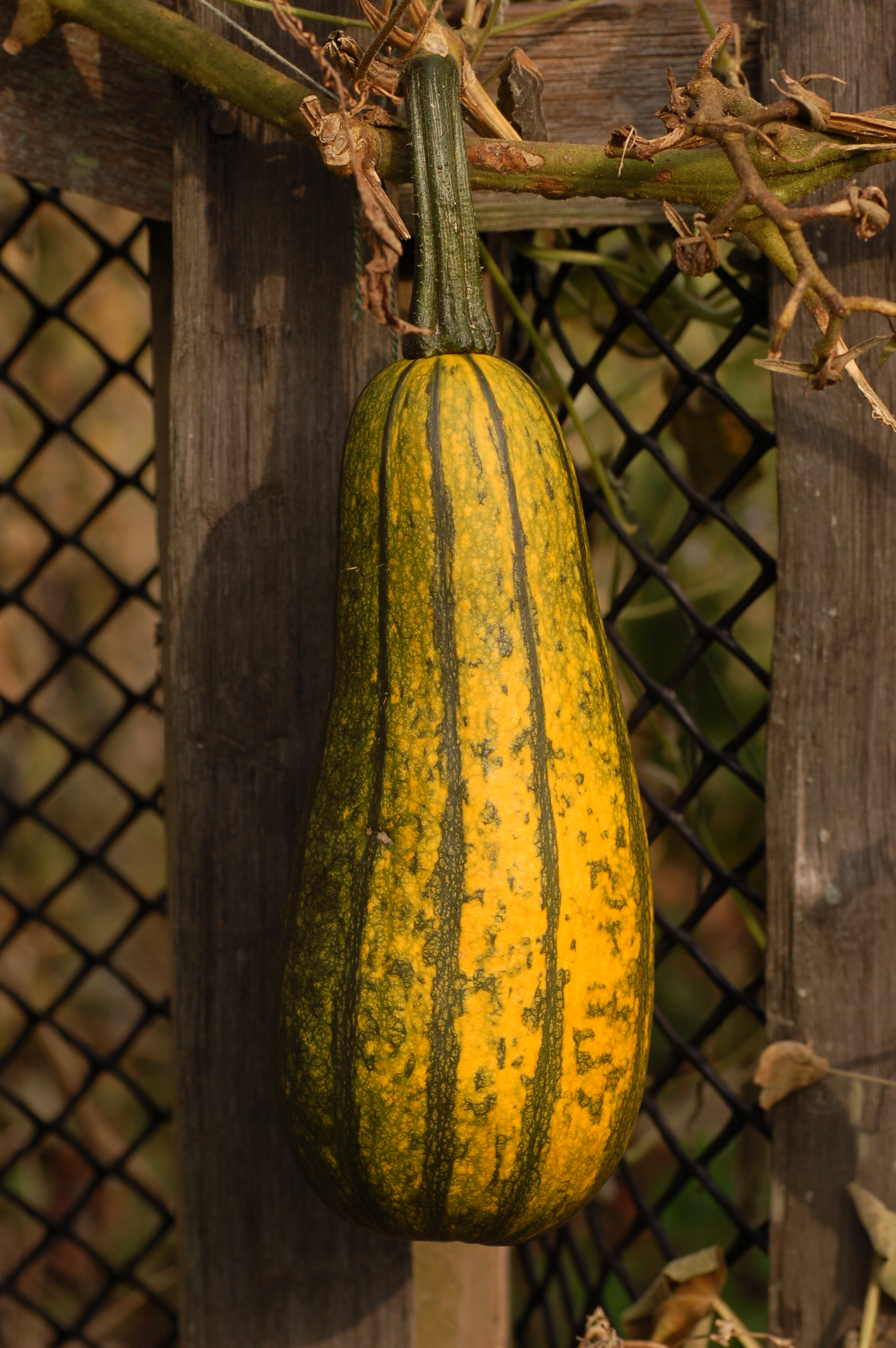
'Delicata' squash

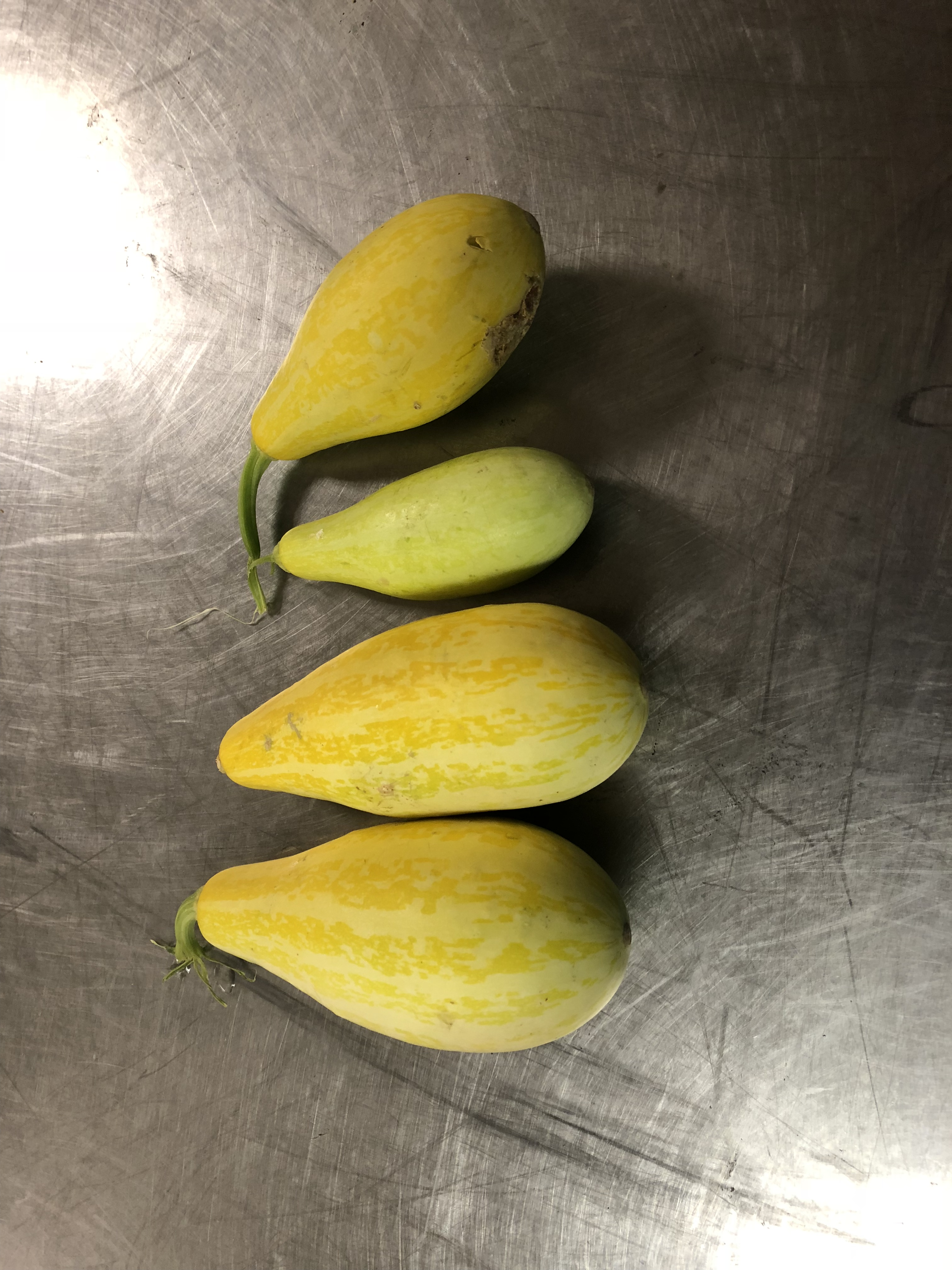
Wild C. pepo subsp. ovifera var. ozarkana

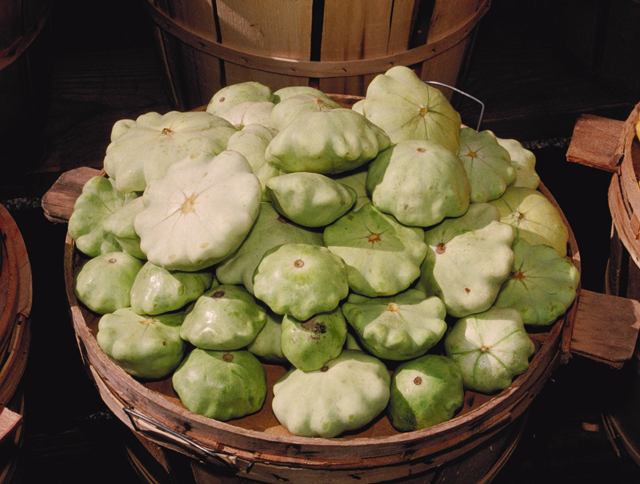
Pattypan squash

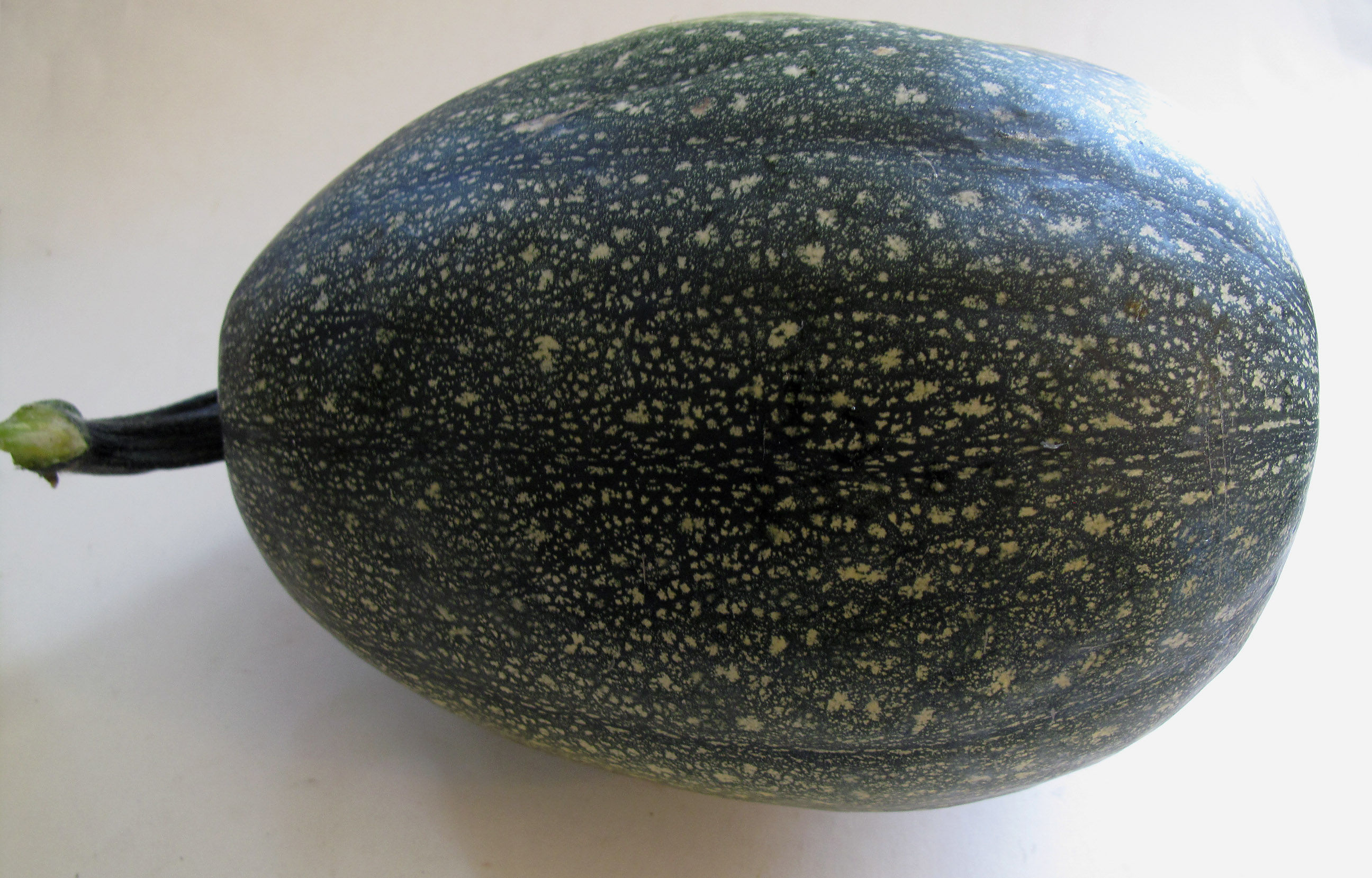
Accidental hybrid of two varieties of C. pepo

==== Subspecies fraterna ====
This subspecies was formerly considered a separate species called C. fraterna by some authorities, but modern biosystematics has placed it as a subspecies of C. pepo. The isozymes are similar between Cucurbita pepo subsp. pepo, and all studied C. fraterna alleles are also found in C. pepo subsp. pepo. It is native to Tamaulipas and Nuevo León, Mexico. This subspecies has not been domesticated. It is considered to be the progenitor and nearest relative of the domesticated subspecies C. pepo subsp. pepo which is found in the same areas as C. pepo subsp. fraterna. It was first formally described by Liberty Hyde Bailey in 1943, in Gentes Herbarum.

Unlike most wild Cucurbita, some specimens of C. fraterna have been found without bitter fruit. Its usual habitat is dry upland scrub areas. It blooms in September and fruits ripen in December.

==== Subspecies texana ====
This subspecies was formerly considered a separate species C. texana by some authorities before being reclassified as a subspecies of C. pepo. A common name is Texas gourd. This subspecies is mesophytic and native to Texas, primarily the southeastern region where it can be found in or near sandy riverbeds. It is found only in the wild. It is possibly a progenitor and close relative of the domesticated subspecies Cucurbita pepo subsp. ovifera, though they are native to different areas. The fraterna subspecies is also closely related. It was first collected 1835 by J. L. Berlandier in southern Texas. It was formally described as Tristemon texanus by George Heinrich Adolf Scheele in 1848 and transferred to the genus Cucurbita by Asa Gray in 1850.

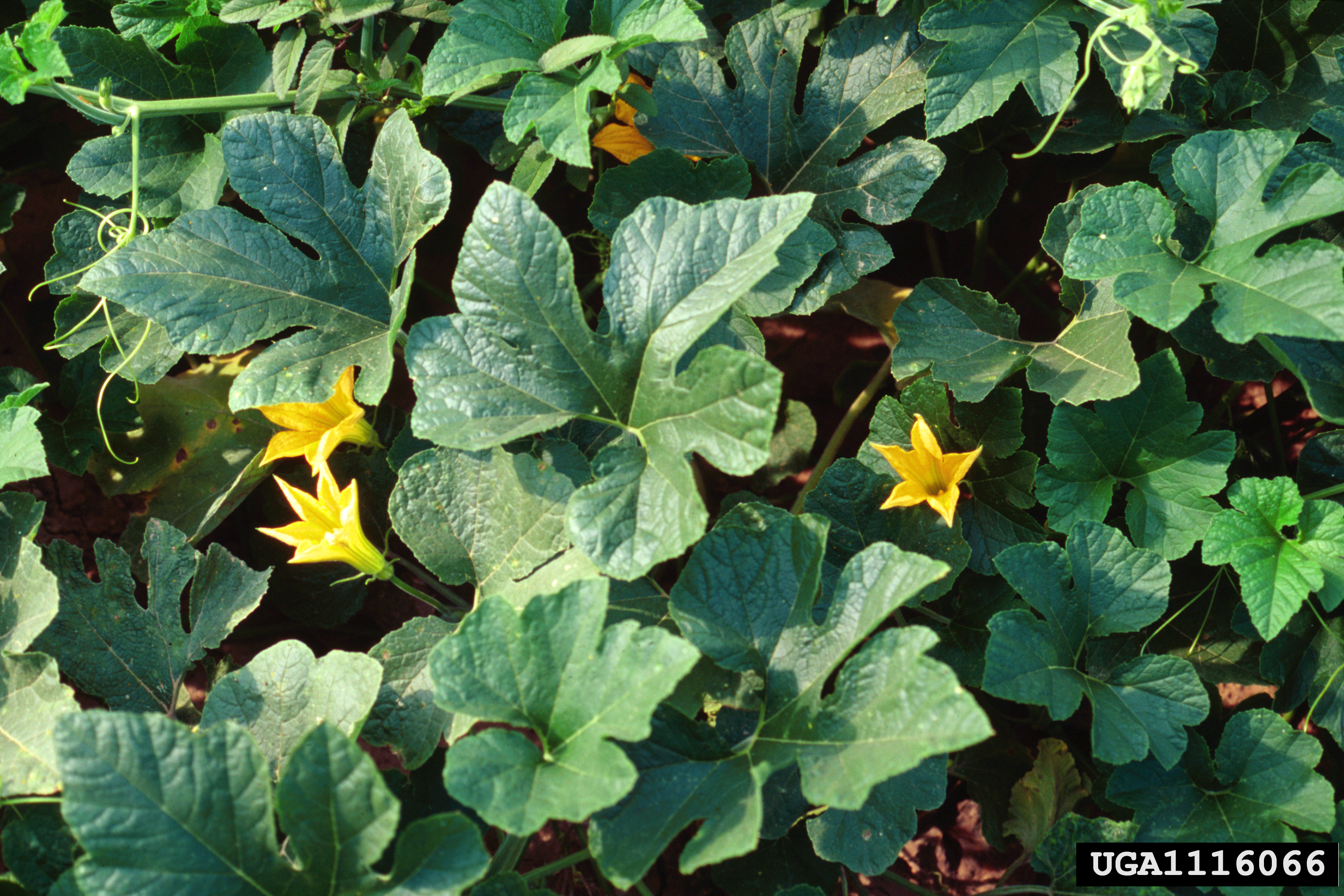
C. pepo subsp. texana plant and young blossoms

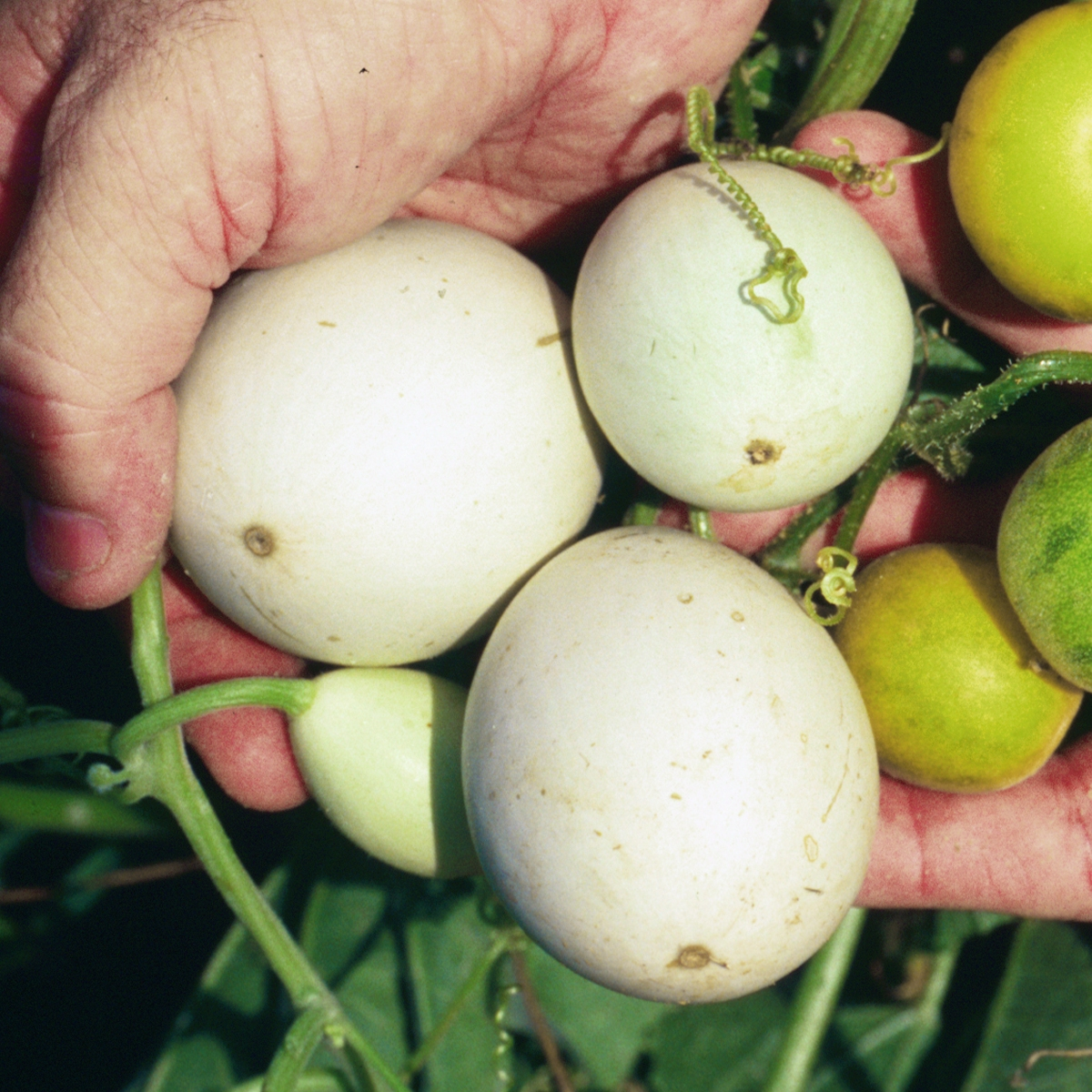
Ripe white C. pepo subsp. texana fruit

== Distribution and habitat ==
The species is found from sea level to slightly above 2,000 m (6,600 ft).

Squash, zucchini, baby, raw (NA) _{Note: assuming}
Nutritional value per 100 g (3.5 oz)
- Energy: 88 kJ (21 kcal)
- Carbohydrates: 3.11 g
- Starch: g
- Sugars: g
- Dietary fiber: 1.1 g
- Fat: 0.4 g
- Saturated: 0.083 g
- Trans: 0 g
- Monounsaturated: 0.031 g
- Polyunsaturated omega−3 omega−6: 0.169 g: g; g
- Protein: 2.71 g
Amino acids
Tryptophan	0.024 g
Threonine	0.066 g
Isoleucine	0.098 g
Leucine	0.159 g
Lysine	0.151 g
Methionine	0.039 g
Cystine	0.029 g
Phenylalanine	0.096 g
Tyrosine	0.073 g
Valine	0.123 g
Arginine	0.115 g
Histidine	0.059 g
Alanine	0.142 g
Aspartic acid	0.332 g
Glutamic acid	0.291 g
Glycine	0.103 g
Proline	0.085 g
Serine	0.111 g
Vitamins and minerals
Vitamins	Quantity %DV^{†}
Vitamin A equiv. lutein zeaxanthin	3% 25 μg: μg
Thiamine (B1)	4% 0.042 mg
Riboflavin (B2)	3% 0.036 mg
Niacin (B3)	4% 0.705 mg
Pantothenic acid (B5)	7% 0.367 mg
Vitamin B6	8% 0.142 mg
Folate (B9)	5% 20 μg
Vitamin C	38% 34.1 mg
Minerals	Quantity %DV^{†}
Iron	4% 0.79 mg
Magnesium	8% 33 mg
Manganese	9% 0.196 mg
Phosphorus	7% 93 mg
Potassium	15% 459 mg
Zinc	8% 0.83 mg
- Other constituents: Quantity
- Water: 92.3 g
- Link to USDA Database entry One large 16 gr One medium 11 gr
- ^{†}Percentages estimated using US recommendations for adults, except for potassium, which is estimated based on expert recommendation from the National Academies.

== Uses ==
Fresh squash is cut into spiral strips, folded into hanks and hung up to dry for winter use. The blossoms are fried in grease and used as a delicacy in combination with other foods. Fresh squash, either whole or in pieces, is roasted in ashes and used for food. In the Zuni culture, the gourds are made into cups, ladles, dippers, and storage receptacles. A poultice of seeds and blossoms was used to treat cactus scratches.

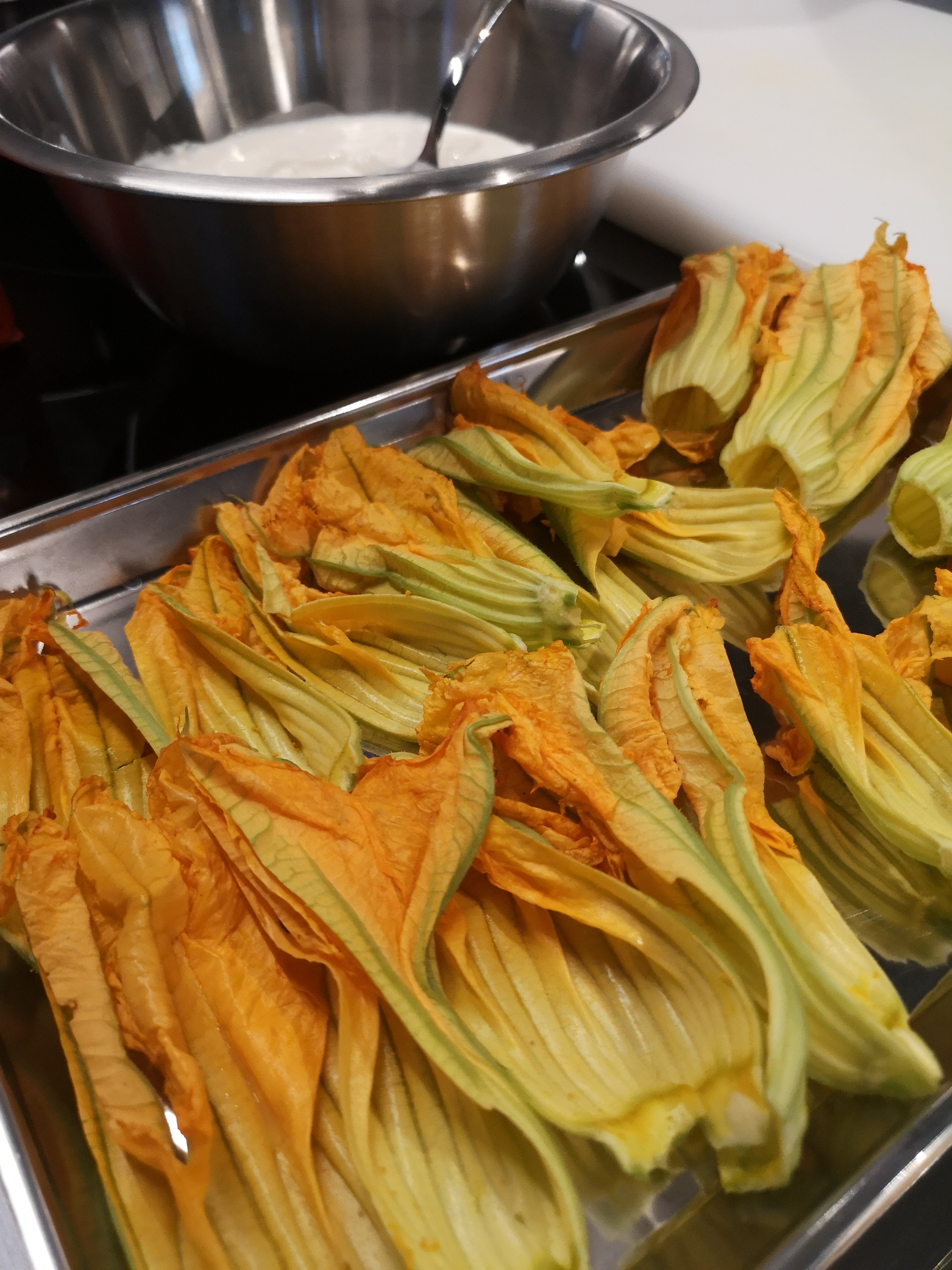
Picked zucchini flowers

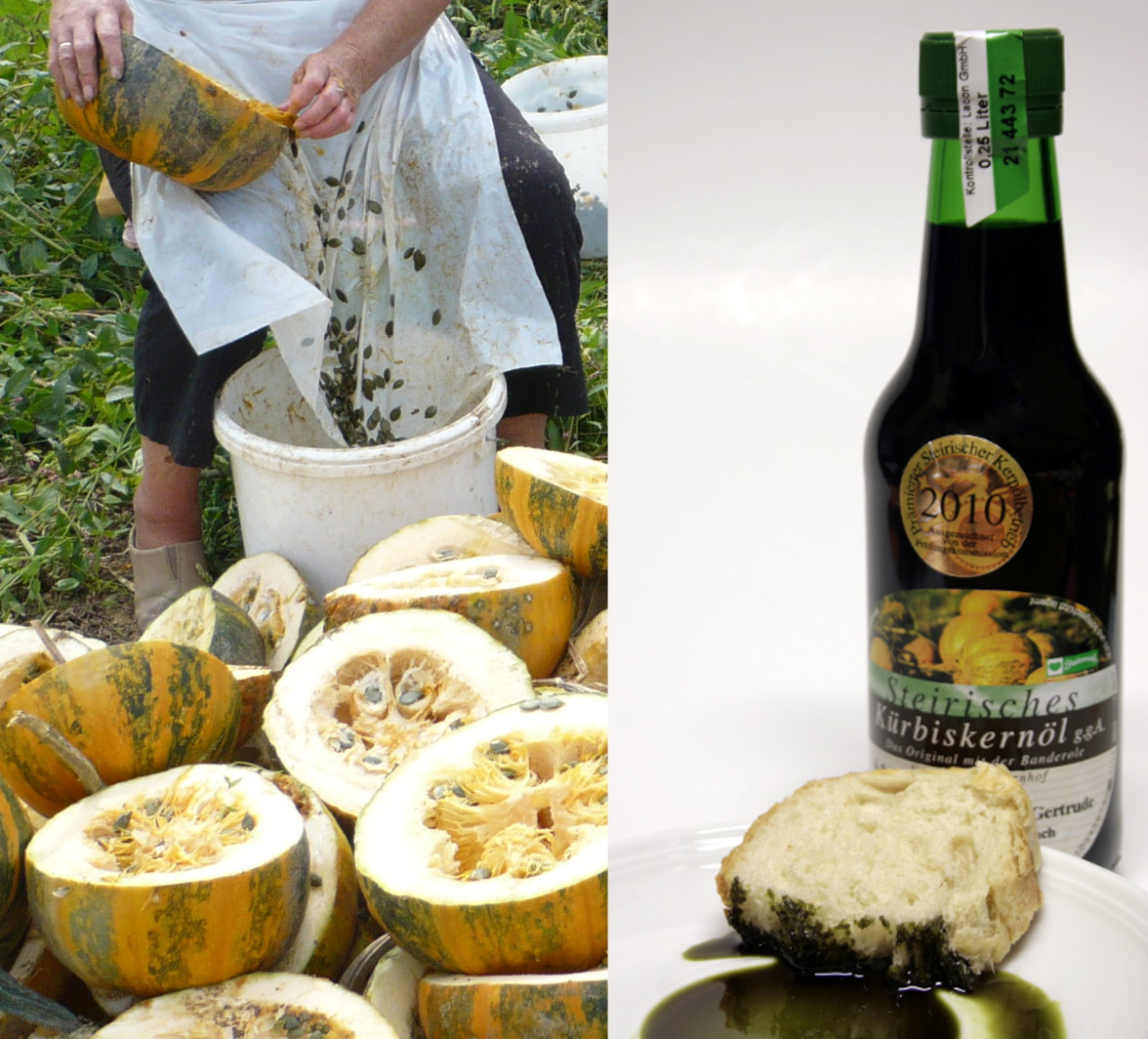
C. pepo var. styriaca used for oil

== In culture ==
The Zuni also wore the gourds in phallic dances, symbolizing fructification, or made them into ceremonial rattles.
