= The Acorn =

The Acorn may refer to:

- The Acorn (band), a Canadian folk band
- The Acorn (journal), a philosophy journal
- The Acorn (pub), historic building in England
- The Acorn, a newspaper group in Southern California owned by Times Media Group

== See also ==
- Acorn (disambiguation)
