= Acorn squash =

Type of squash

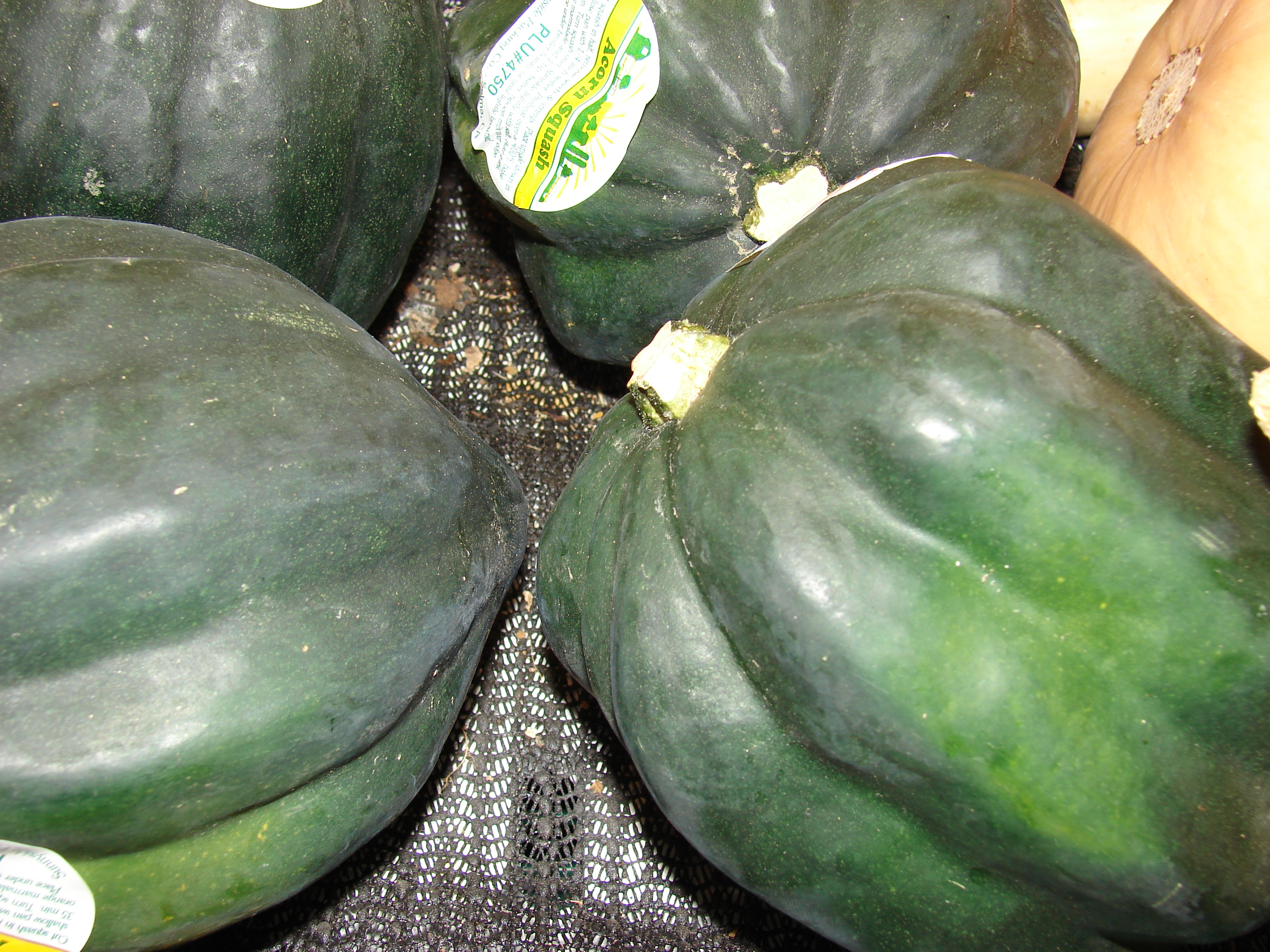
- Acorn squash for sale in a market
- Species: Cucurbita pepo
- Cultivar group: C. pepo var. turbinata
- Origin: North America and Central America

Acorn squash (Cucurbita pepo var. turbinata), also called pepper squash or Des Moines squash, is a winter squash with distinctive longitudinal ridges on its exterior and sweet, yellow-orange flesh inside. Although considered a winter squash, acorn squash belongs to the same species (Cucurbita pepo) as all summer squashes (including zucchini and crookneck squash).

Indigenous to North and Central America, the squash was introduced to early European settlers by Native Americans.

== Appearance ==
The most common variety is dark green on the outside, often with a single splotch of orange on the side or top; however, newer varieties have arisen, including 'golden acorn', so named for its glowing yellow color, as well as varieties that are white. Golden acorn squash with an orange color are sometimes sold around Halloween for carving into small jack-o'-lanterns. Acorn squash can also be variegated. As the name suggests, its shape resembles an acorn. Acorn squashes typically weigh one to two pounds and are between four and seven inches long. The stem has a prickly feel.

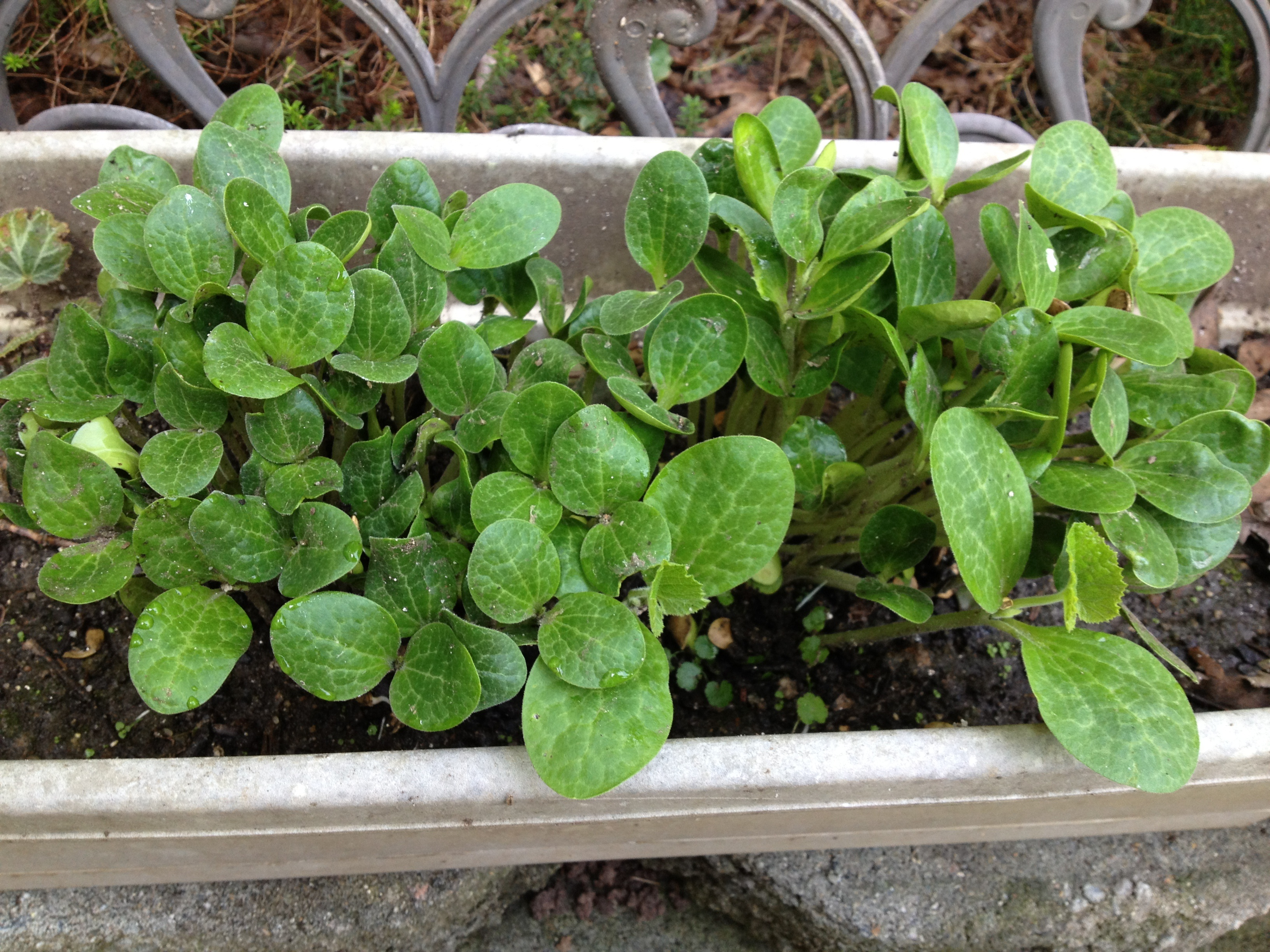
Acorn squash sprouts

== Cultivation ==
Acorn squash is very easily grown: seeds are started after the danger of frost is past and the soil is warm or started for transplant 3 to 4 weeks before the predicted last frost date in the area. In one method, seeds directly sown are placed 25 mm (1 inch) deep, 5 to 6 to a hill. Grow hills are separated by 2 m (6 feet) in all directions.

About 85 days after germination, acorn squash are ready to be harvested.

== Storage ==
Acorn squash keep well in a temperature-controlled environment, such as a root cellar, maintaining their quality well for at least 3.5 months with a simple cleaning pretreatment known as Hot Water Rinsing and Brushing or HWRB.

== Curing ==
Curing takes seven to ten days in a sheltered area outside or a warm dry place (like a storage space) protected from frost. The curing process helps the fruit keep longer before spoiling.

== Characteristics ==
As with other squash varieties, the acorn squash vine makes yellow trumpet flowers that are edible. Tops about three inches from the end are also edible and they are one of the most common vegetables in the Philippines (as greens).

== Uses ==
The flavor of acorn squash has been described as mild, subtly sweet, and nutty. It is most commonly baked, but can also be microwaved, sauteed or steamed. For savory recipes, it may be stuffed with rice, meat or vegetable mixtures. If a sweeter dish is desired, maple syrup is often used to fill the halves prior to baking, or used in a sauce or glaze to enhance the squash's flavor. The skin is edible and the seeds of the squash can also be eaten, usually after being toasted first. Acorn squash can be used to prepare squash soup.

This squash is not as rich in beta-carotene as other winter squashes, but is a good source of dietary fiber and potassium, as well as smaller amounts of vitamins C and B, magnesium, and manganese.
