= Crookneck squash =

Cultivar of Cucurbita pepo

Cucurbita pepo 'Yellow crookneck'
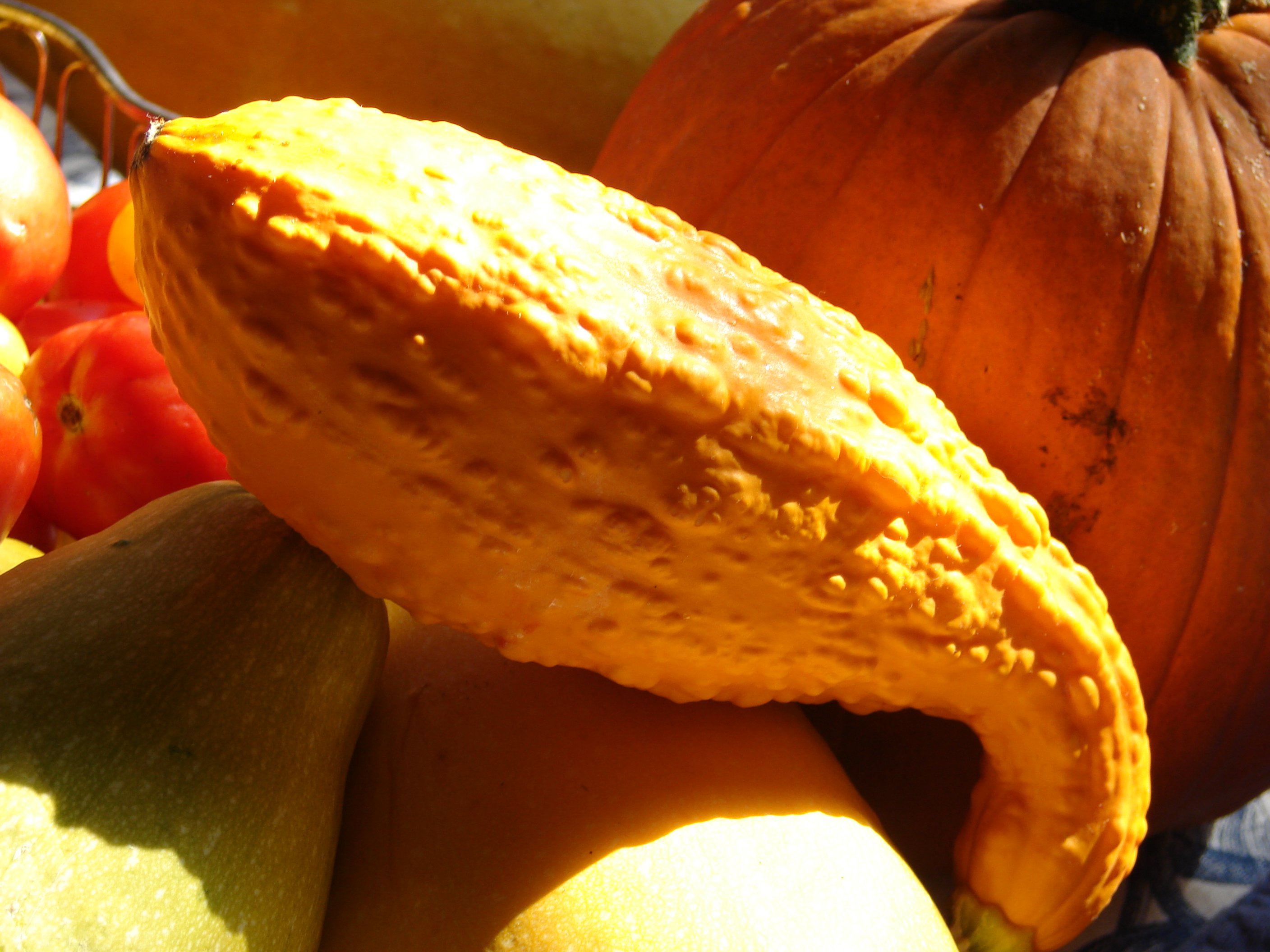
- Crookneck squash along with other types of squash
- Species: Cucurbita pepo
- Cultivar: Yellow crookneck
- Origin: Eastern North America

Crookneck squash
Nutritional value per 100 g (3.5 oz)
- Energy: 19 kcal (79 kJ)
- Carbohydrates: 3.9 g
- Dietary fiber: 1.0 g
- Fat: 0.3 g
- Protein: 1.0 g
Vitamins and minerals
| Vitamins | Quantity %DV^{†} |
| Riboflavin (B2) | 3% 0.04 mg |
| Vitamin C | 21% 19 mg |
| Minerals | Quantity %DV^{†} |
| Potassium | 7% 222 mg |
- Other constituents: Quantity
- Water: 94 g
- ^{†}Percentages estimated using US recommendations for adults, except for potassium, which is estimated based on expert recommendation from the National Academies.

Crookneck squash, also known as yellow squash, is a cultivar of Cucurbita pepo, the species that also includes some pumpkins and most other summer squashes. The plants are bushy and do not spread like the plants of winter squash and pumpkin. Most often used as a summer squash, it is characterized by its yellow skin (which may be smooth or bumpy) and sweet yellow flesh, as well as its distinctive curved stem-end or "crooked neck". It should not be confused with crookneck cultivars of Cucurbita moschata, such as the winter squash 'Golden Cushaw', or the vining summer squash 'Tromboncino'. Its name distinguishes it from another similar-looking variety of C. pepo, the straightneck squash, which is also usually yellow. There is one similar non-edible C. pepo variety: C. pepo var. ovifera.

Yellow crookneck squash are generally harvested immature, when they are less than two inches in diameter, since the skin toughens and the quality degrades as the squash reaches full maturity.
