= Despeciation =

Loss of a species of animal due to its combining with another species

Despeciation is the loss of a unique species of animal due to its combining with another previously distinct species. It is the opposite of speciation and is much more rare. It is similar to extinction in that there is a loss of a unique species but without the associated loss of a biological lineage. Despeciation has been noted in species of butterflies, sunflowers, mosquitoes, fish, wolves, and even humans.

== Examples ==
=== North American ravens ===
Holarctic ravens and Californian ravens had been two separate species for 1.5 million years until tens of thousands of years ago when their regions overlapped and they began to merge into a new species. This new raven species contains genes coming from both the Holarctic and Californian raven. This was possible because they occupy the same area of the Western United States.

=== Three-spined sticklebacks ===
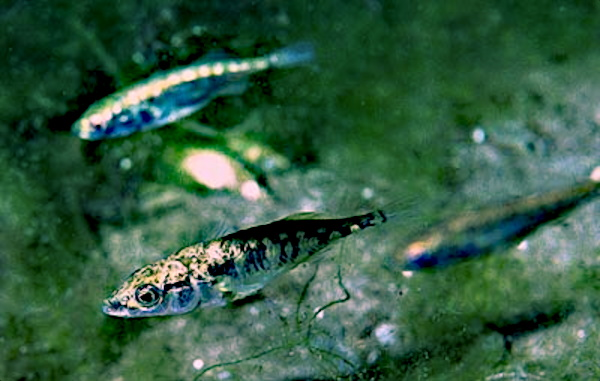
The three-spined stickleback (Gasterosteus aculeatus)

Another possible cause for despeciation is increased gene flow and hybridization due to changes in the environment. One of these changes could include the loss of essential nourishment resources for each individual species. For example, Taylor et al.'s genetic analysis of three-spined sticklebacks across six lakes in southwestern British Columbia found two distinct species in 1977 and 1988 but only one combined species in data from 1997, 2000, and 2002. The new species is a hybrid and shows an intermediate form of the parental genotype. They concluded that external factors had imperiled the living conditions of the two species, thus eliminating the evolutionary specializations that had kept them unique.

=== Humans ===
Anatomically modern humans (Homo sapiens) are considered to have undergone despeciation due to the genomes associated with remains of the closest archaic human species to modern humans, such as the Denisovans and Neanderthals, among others. These genomes show that human ancestors interbred with these other hominins. Genes identified as being of Neanderthal and Denisovan origin have been located in the genome of modern humans in varying amounts dependent on location, and one Neanderthal-Denisovan hybrid nicknamed Denny has been identified, indicating that interbreeding took place where populations of the three species met.
