= Acute Care of at-Risk Newborns =

Educational program about resuscitation of newborns

Acute Care of at-Risk Newborns (ACoRN) is a Canadian resuscitation educational program which focuses on the first few hours of neonatal life. This differs from the Neonatal Resuscitation Program which focuses on the first several minutes. It was developed in Winnipeg, Manitoba.

== Provinces/Territories implementing ACoRN ==
- British Columbia
- Alberta
- Manitoba
- Ontario
- Newfoundland and Labrador
- Nova Scotia
- Prince Edward Island
- The Northwest Territories
