= Spaghetti squash =

Group of cultivars

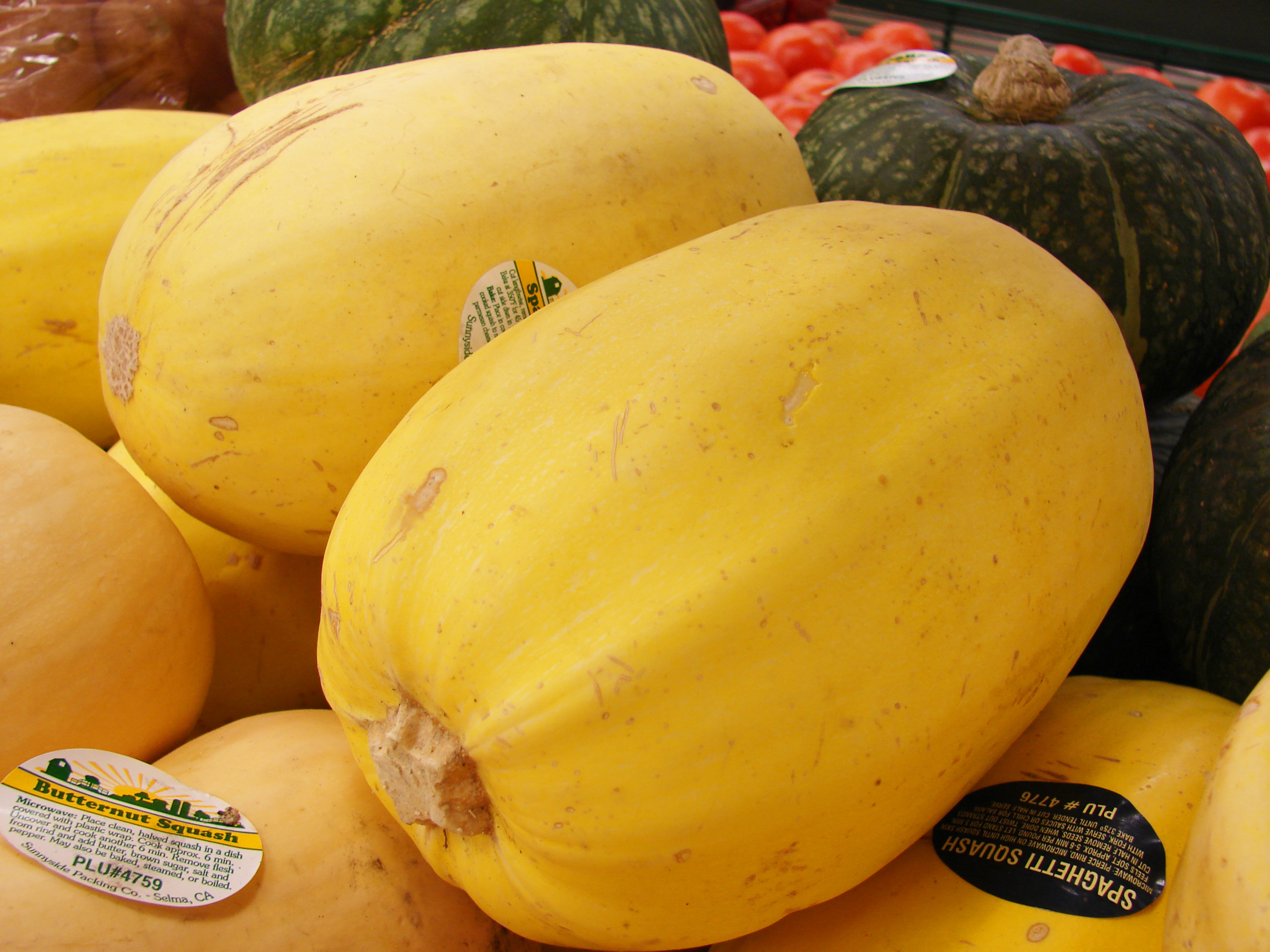
- Fruit of a yellow-skinned cultivar
- Species: Cucurbita pepo
- Origin: Asia

Spaghetti squash, raw
Nutritional value per 100 g (3.5 oz)
- Energy: 130 kJ (31 kcal)
- Carbohydrates: 6.91 g
- Sugars: 2.76 g
- Dietary fiber: 1.5 g
- Fat: 0.57 g
- Protein: 0.64 g
Vitamins and minerals
Vitamins	Quantity %DV^{†}
Vitamin A equiv. beta-Carotene	1% 6 μg 1% 64 μg
Thiamine (B1)	3% 0.037 mg
Riboflavin (B2)	1% 0.018 mg
Niacin (B3)	6% 0.95 mg
Pantothenic acid (B5)	7% 0.36 mg
Vitamin B6	6% 0.101 mg
Folate (B9)	3% 12 μg
Vitamin C	2% 2.1 mg
Vitamin E	1% 0.13 mg
Minerals	Quantity %DV^{†}
Calcium	2% 23 mg
Iron	2% 0.31 mg
Magnesium	3% 12 mg
Manganese	5% 0.125 mg
Phosphorus	1% 12 mg
Potassium	4% 108 mg
Zinc	2% 0.19 mg
- Other constituents: Quantity
- Water: 91.6 g
- Link to USDA Database entry
- ^{†}Percentages estimated using US recommendations for adults, except for potassium, which is estimated based on expert recommendation from the National Academies.

Spaghetti squash or vegetable spaghetti is a group of cultivars of Cucurbita pepo subsp. pepo. They are available in a variety of shapes, sizes, and colors, including ivory, yellow and orange, with orange having the highest amount of carotene. Its center contains many large seeds.

When raw, the flesh is solid and similar to other raw squash. When cooked, the flesh of the fruit falls away from the rind in ribbons or strands that look like and can be used as a vegetable, whole-food, gluten-free alternative to spaghetti.

== Preparation ==
Spaghetti squash can be cooked by baking, boiling, steaming, air frying, or microwaving. Once cooked, the flesh of this fruit can be prepared in a way that its "strands" look like and are as long as traditional spaghetti noodles. It can be served with or without sauce as a substitute for pasta, and its seeds can be roasted, similar to pumpkin seeds.

== Nutrition ==
Raw spaghetti squash is 92% water, 7% carbohydrates, and contains less than 1% each of protein and fat (table). In a reference amount of 100 g (3.5 oz), raw spaghetti squash supplies 31 calories of food energy, and has overall a low content of micronutrients (table).

== Cultivation ==
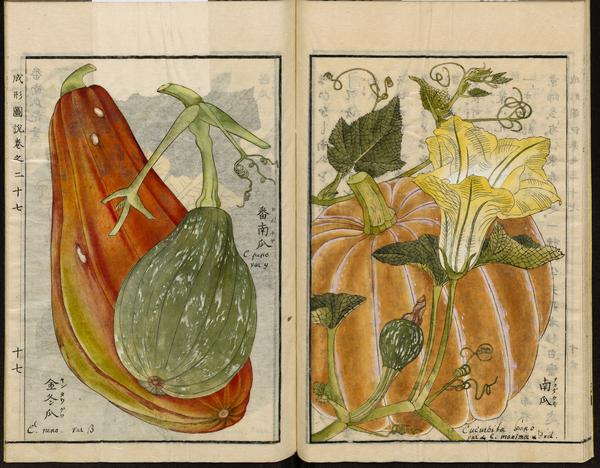
Spaghetti squash (left) illustration from the Japanese agricultural encyclopedia Seikei Zusetsu (1804)

Spaghetti squash is relatively easy to grow, thriving in gardens or pots.

The plants are monoecious, with male and female flowers on the same plant. Male flowers have long, thin stems that extend upwards from the vine. Female flowers are shorter, with a small round growth underneath the petals. This round growth turns into the squash if the flower is successfully pollinated.

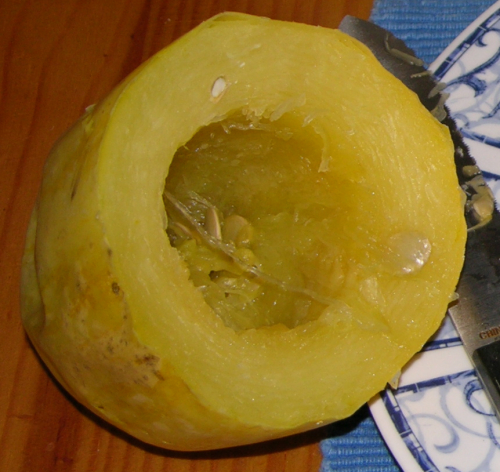
Cooked

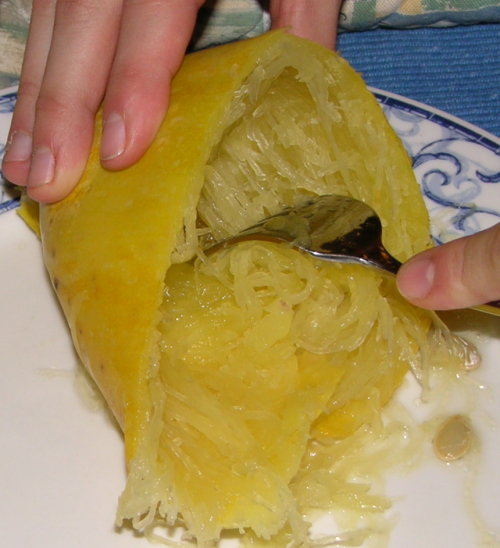
Prepared

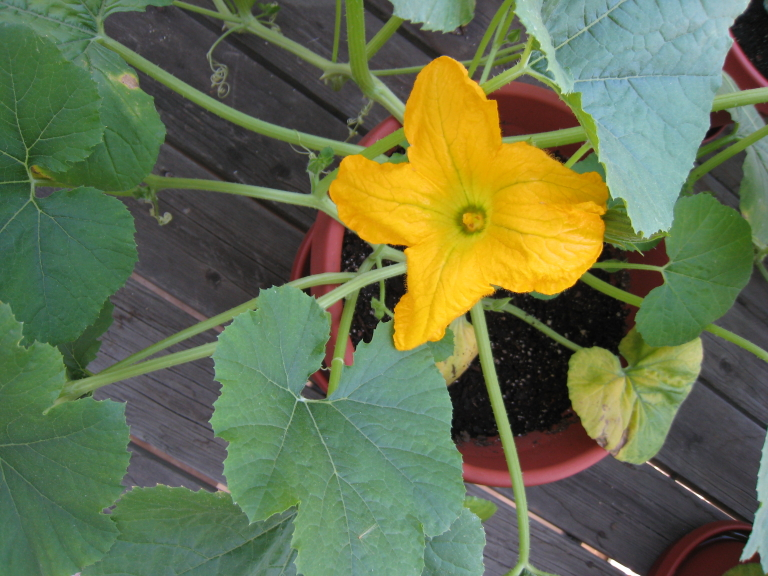
Male flower

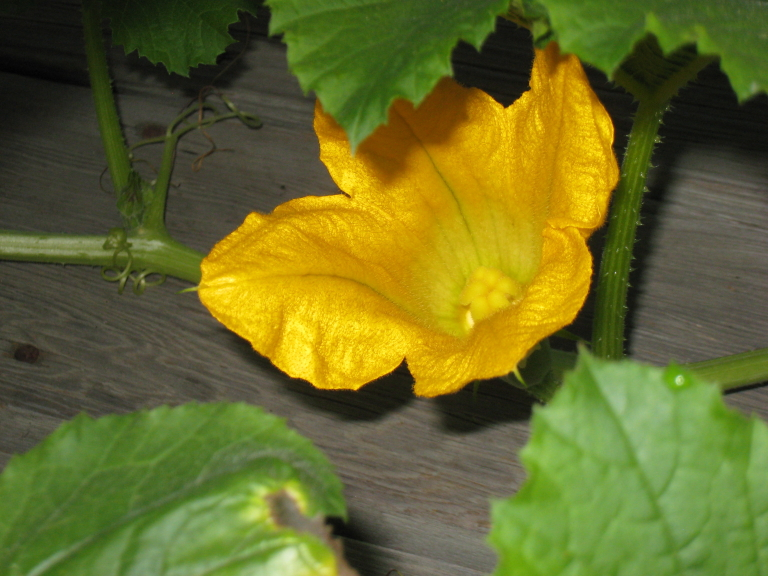
Female flower

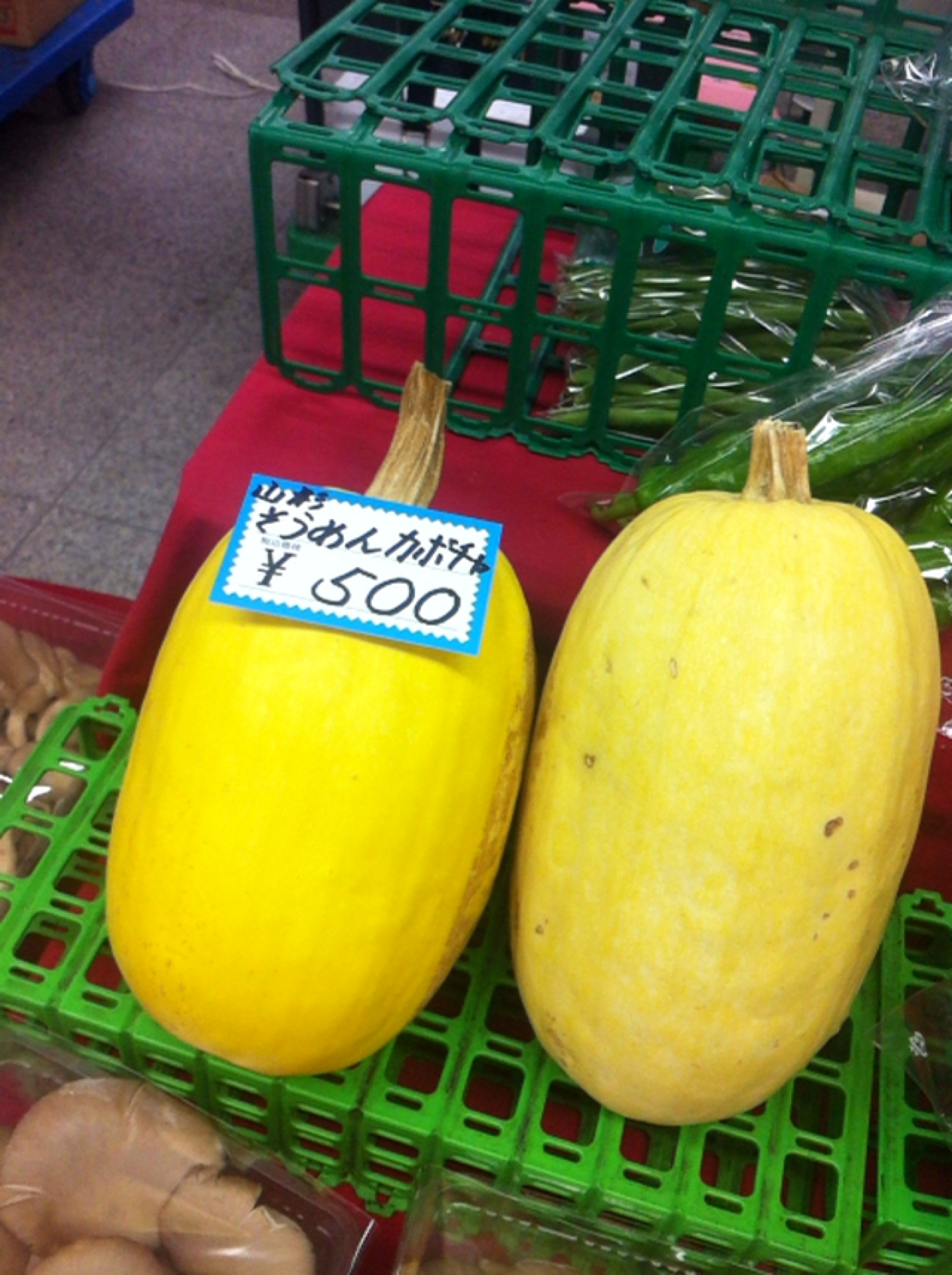
Being sold at a greengrocer in Japan

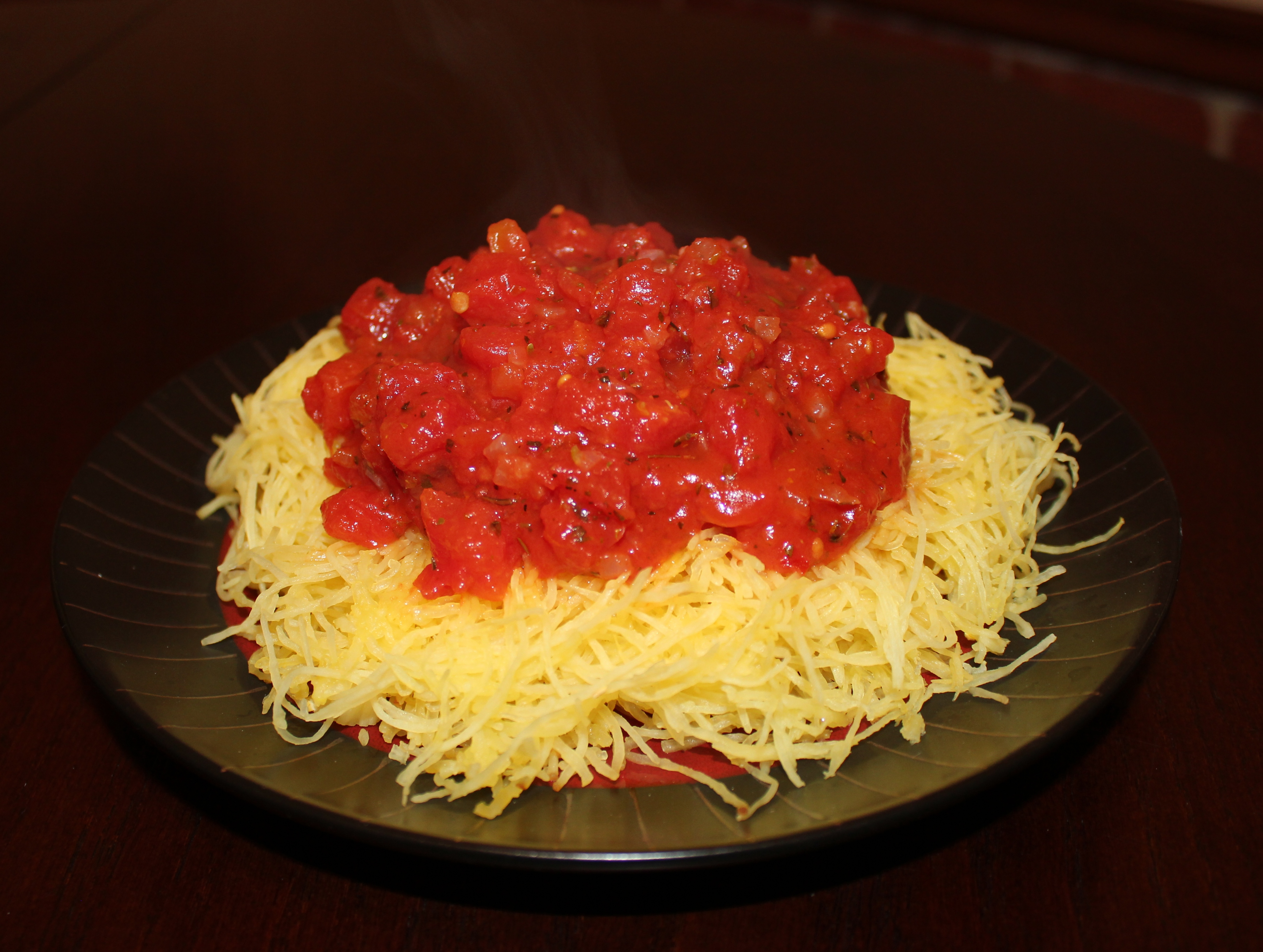
Served with marinara sauce
