= Pattypan squash =

Ancient variety of summer squash native to North America

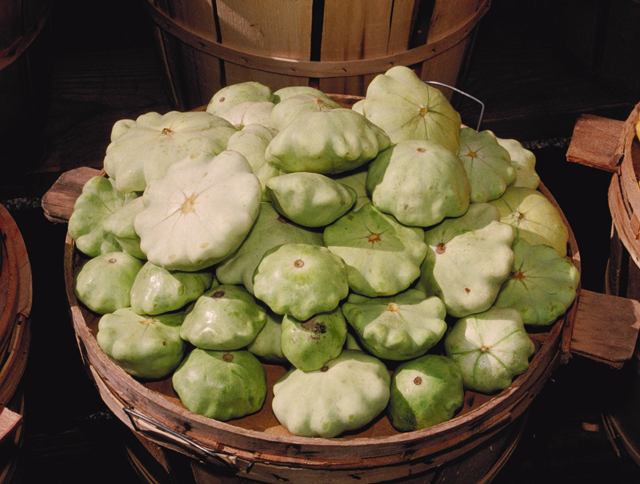
- White pattypan squash
- Species: Cucurbita pepo
- Cultivar: Multiple cultivar groups
- Origin: North America (8,000-10,000 years ago)

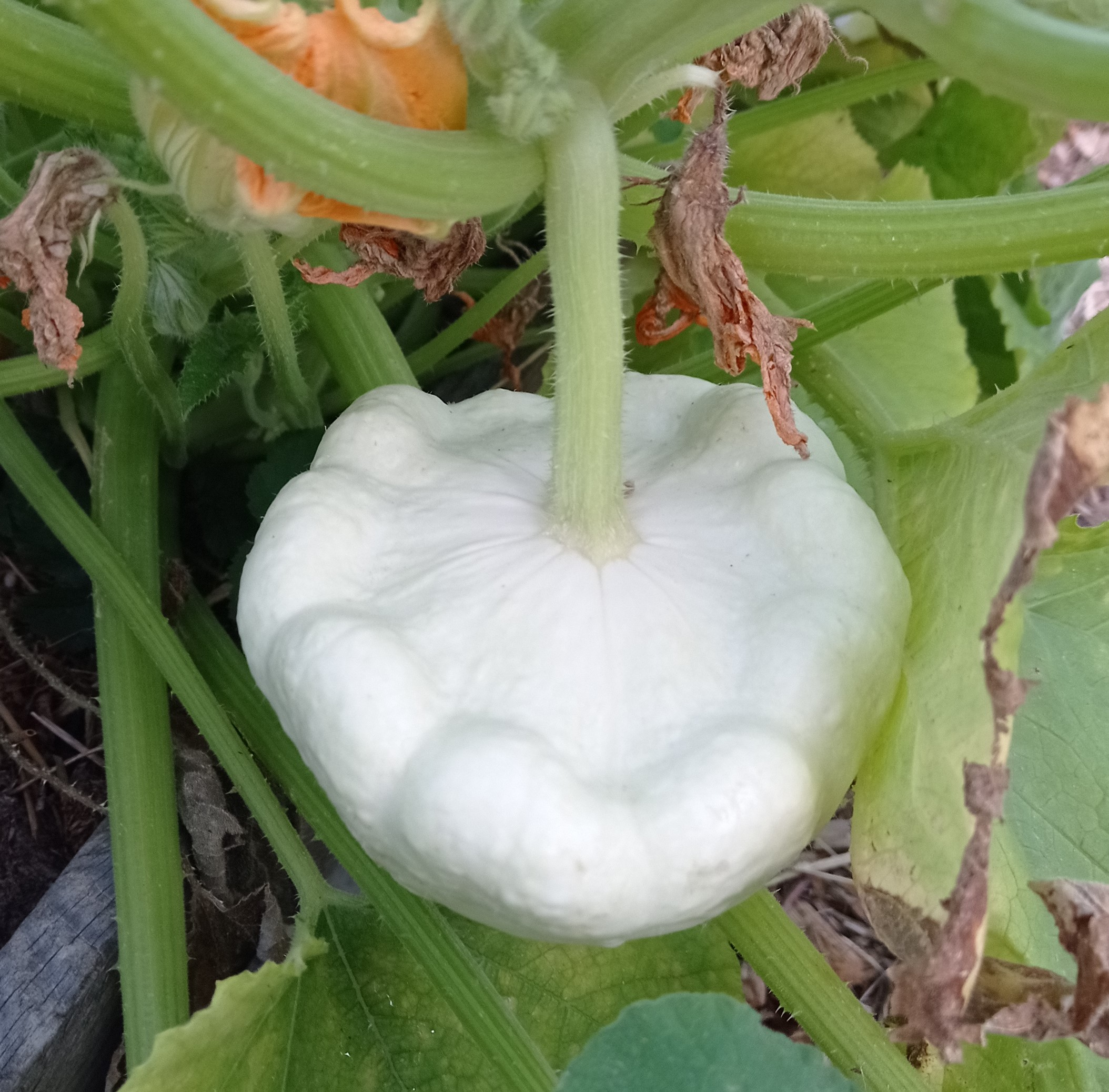
Mature pattypan squash ready for harvesting

Pattypan squash (or patty pan) is a varietal group of summer squash (Cucurbita pepo) notable for its round and shallow shape, and scalloped edges, somewhat resembling a flying saucer. Pattypan squash represents one of the oldest domesticated varieties of C. pepo, with archaeological evidence showing cultivation by Native Americans in eastern North America dating back 8,000-10,000 years.

== Etymology ==
The name "pattypan" derives from "a pan for baking a patty", referring to the squash's resemblance to a shallow, scalloped baking pan. Its French name, pâtisson, derives from a Provençal word for a cake made in a scalloped mould. The pattypan squash is also known by numerous regional names including scallop squash, granny squash, custard squash, ciblème in Cajun French, button squash, scallopini, or simply "squash" in Australian English.

== History and origins ==
=== Pre-Columbian cultivation ===
Archaeological evidence from sites across eastern North America indicates that pattypan-type squash were among the earliest domesticated crops in the region. Excavations at sites in Illinois, Kentucky, and Missouri have revealed Cucurbita pepo seeds and rind fragments dating to approximately 8,000-10,000 years ago. These early varieties were typically smaller and had thicker rinds than modern cultivars, but shared the characteristic flattened, scalloped shape.

=== Role in Native American agriculture ===
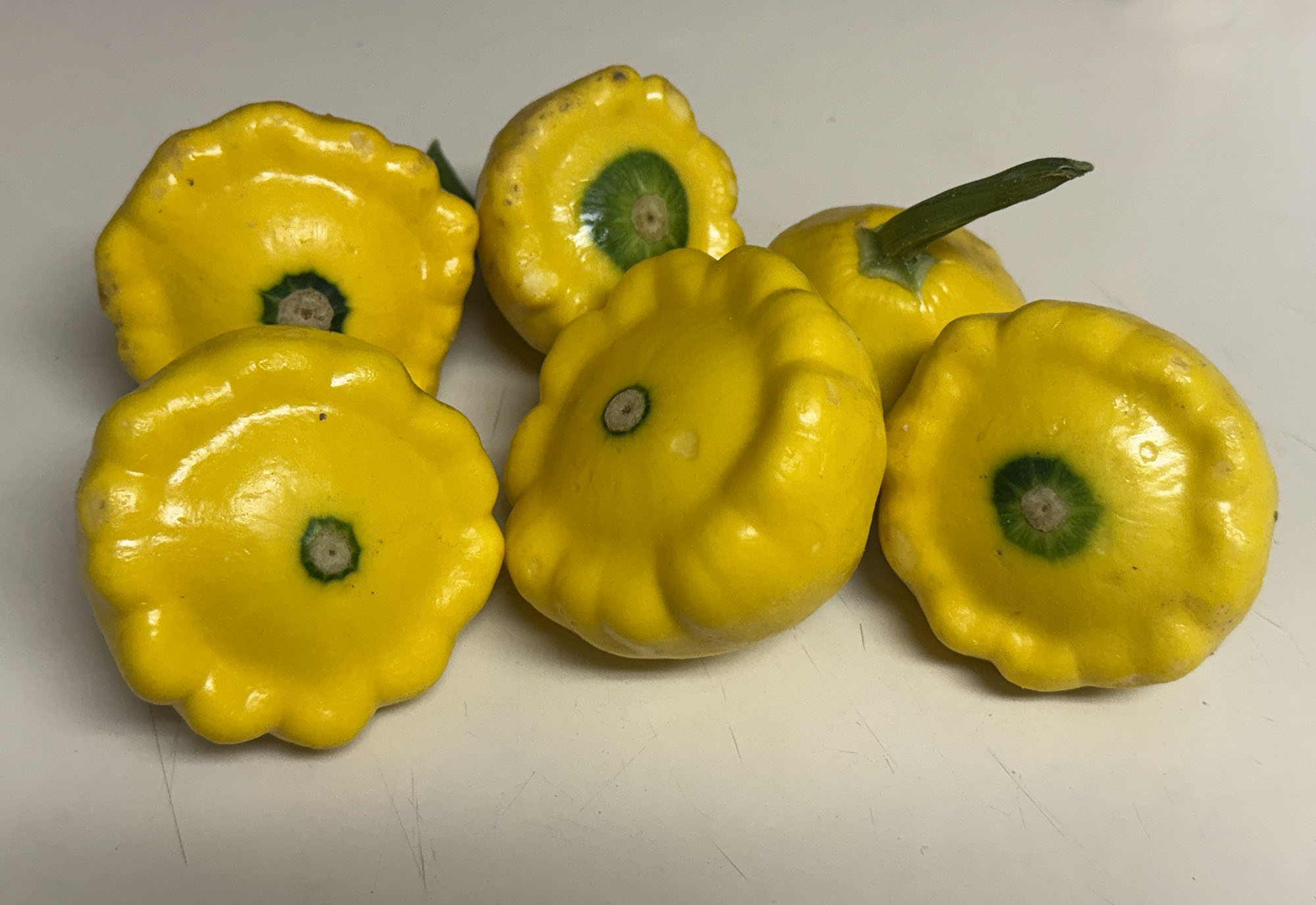
Golden Bush pattypan squash grown in New Mexico

Pattypan squash played a crucial role in traditional Native American agricultural systems, particularly as part of the "Three Sisters" polyculture alongside maize and common beans. The broad leaves of squash plants provided ground cover that retained soil moisture and suppressed weeds, while the prickly vines deterred pests from the corn and bean plants.

Different Native American groups developed distinct varieties adapted to local growing conditions. The Haudenosaunee (Iroquois) cultivated several pattypan varieties, including both summer types harvested young for their tender flesh and winter storage types allowed to mature fully.

=== European contact and global spread ===
European colonists first encountered pattypan squash in the early 1600s and quickly adopted them into their own agricultural practices. Jacques Cartier described seeing "very large cucumbers" (likely referring to various squash including pattypans) during his explorations of the St. Lawrence River valley in the 1530s.

By the 1700s, European settlers had established pattypan cultivation throughout the Thirteen Colonies, and seeds were being sent back to Europe. The varieties spread globally through colonial trade networks, reaching Australia, South Africa, and Asia by the 19th century.

== Botanical characteristics ==
=== Plant description ===
Pattypan squash plants are typically annual vines with large, palmately lobed leaves and bright yellow flowers. Like other C. pepo varieties, they are monoecious, producing separate male and female flowers on the same plant. The plants require warm weather and are sensitive to frost.

=== Fruit characteristics ===
The distinctive flattened, round shape with scalloped edges distinguishes pattypan from other summer squash varieties. Fruits are typically harvested when 2-4 inches in diameter for optimal tenderness, though they can grow much larger if left to mature. The skin is edible when young but becomes tougher with age.

=== Varieties ===
Pattypan squash comes in white, yellow, orange, light green, dark green, and multicolored varieties. Popular cultivars include:

- 'White Bush Scallop' - traditional white variety
- 'Golden Bush Scallop' - bright yellow fruits
- 'Peter Pan' - pale green hybrid variety
- 'Sunburst' - yellow with green markings

== Cultivation ==
=== Growing requirements ===
Pattypan squash requires full sun and well-drained, fertile soil with a pH between 6.0-7.5. Seeds are typically direct-sown after the last frost date when soil temperatures reach 65°F (18°C). Plants need consistent moisture but should not be overwatered to prevent root rot.

=== Harvesting ===
For summer use, fruits are harvested when small and tender, typically 2-4 inches across. The skin should be easily pierced with a fingernail. Regular harvesting encourages continued production. For winter storage, fruits can be left to mature fully until the rind hardens.

== Culinary uses ==
=== Traditional preparations ===
Native American groups prepared pattypan squash in various ways, including roasting whole fruits in coals, drying sliced pieces for winter storage, and incorporating the flowers and young shoots into meals. The mature fruits were often stored whole for winter consumption.

=== Modern cuisine ===
The squash is most tender when immature and is commonly prepared by slicing and sautéing, grilling, or roasting. In fine cuisine, the tender flesh is sometimes scooped out and mixed with flavorings such as garlic, herbs, or cheese prior to reinsertion; the scooped-out husk serves as an edible serving vessel.

Pattypan squash can be:

- Sliced and grilled or roasted
- Stuffed with various fillings
- Added to ratatouille and other vegetable medleys
- Pickled in sweet vinegar (Polish and Ukrainian cuisine)
- Used in tempura and other battered preparations

== Nutritional value ==
Pattypan squash is low in calories and rich in several nutrients. One cup (approximately 130g) of sliced raw pattypan contains:

- Calories: 18-25
- Vitamin C: 35% Daily Value
- Vitamin A: 8% Daily Value
- Magnesium: 7% Daily Value
- Potassium: 6% Daily Value
- Folate: 4% Daily Value
- Dietary fiber: 1-2g

The squash is also a source of niacin, manganese, and beta-carotene. It contains no fat and very little sodium.

== Cultural significance ==
Pattypan squash holds particular cultural importance among Native American communities as one of the foundational crops of traditional agriculture. Many tribes continue to grow heritage varieties and maintain traditional preparation methods as part of cultural preservation efforts.

The squash has also found significance in modern sustainable agriculture and heirloom variety preservation movements, with seed savers working to maintain genetic diversity among traditional cultivars.

== See also ==
- Indigenous cuisine of the Americas
- Zucchini
