= Acorn Energy =

Acorn Energy Inc.
- Company type: Public
- Traded as: Nasdaq: ACFN
- Industry: Energy
- Founded: 1984; 42 years ago
- Founder: George Morgenstern
- Revenue: ▼US$ 19.560 million (2015)
- Website: AcornEnergy.com

Acorn Energy Inc. is a NASDAQ-listed conglomerate investing in electricity generation and security. It was founded by George Morgenstern in 1984 as Decision Systems, Inc. and was taken public by Laidlaw Securities. The name was later changed to Data Systems and Software Inc. John Moore became CEO in 2006 and changed the name to Acorn Factor and later to Acorn Energy.

== Major subsidiaries ==
DSIT makes systems of sonar arrays that detect underwater activity; these are marketed by Acorn Energy for the protection of energy infrastructure facilities near water. GridSense makes hardware for monitoring transformer performance for smart grid applications. OmniMetrix monitors critical energy infrastructure like standby generators, compressors and pump jacks to ensure up-time. US Seismic Systems manufactures fibre-optic transducers for monitoring oil and gas fields during production.
