= Winter squash =

Squash harvested and eaten in mature stage; skin hardened into tough rind

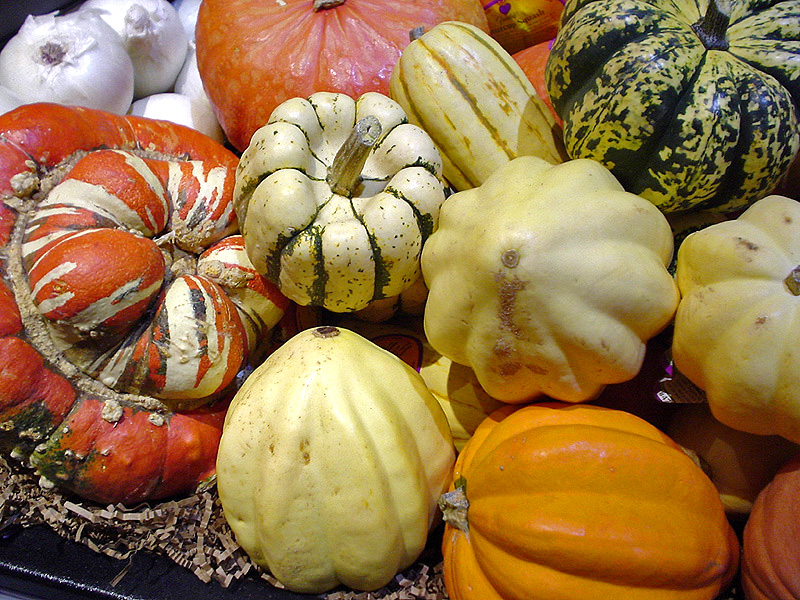
An assortment of winter squashes

Winter squash is an annual fruit representing several species of squash within the genus Cucurbita – odd-shaped, rough or warty, late-growing varieties, less symmetrical, small to medium in size, but with long-keeping qualities and hard rinds. They differ from summer squash in that they are harvested and eaten in the mature stage when their seeds within have matured fully and their skin has hardened into a tough rind. At this stage, most varieties of this fruit can be stored for use during the winter. Winter squash is generally cooked before being eaten, and the skin or rind is not usually eaten as it is with summer squash.

== Varieties ==
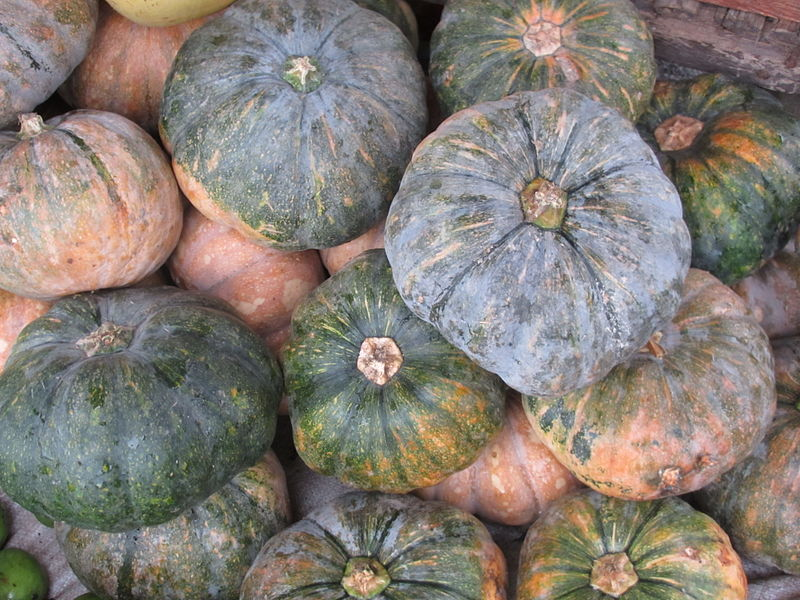
Calabaza, a winter squash common in Cuba, Florida, Puerto Rico, and the Philippines

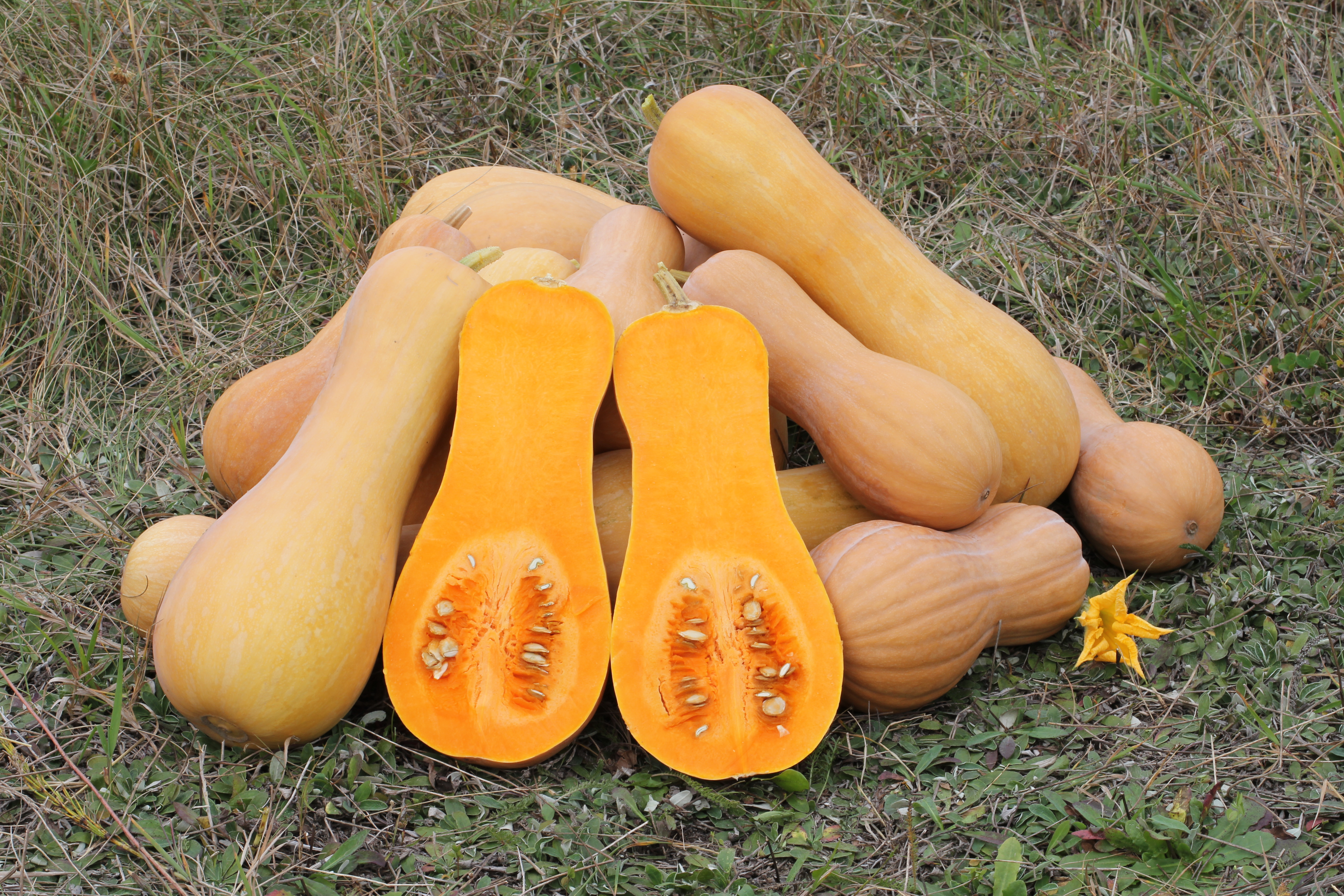
Butternut squash is a popular variety of winter squash

At least five species in the genus Cucurbita have been domesticated and have cultivars grown as winter squashes: C. argyrosperma, C. ficifolia, C. maxima, C. moschata, and C. pepo.

Cultivars of winter squash that are round and orange are called pumpkins. In New Zealand and Australian English, the term pumpkin generally refers to the broader category called winter squash elsewhere.

== Planting and harvesting ==
Squash is a frost-tender plant meaning that the seeds do not germinate in cold soil. Winter squash seeds germinate best when the soil temperature is 21 to 35 °C (70 to 95 °F), with the warmer end of the range being optimal. It is harvested whenever the fruit has turned a deep, solid color and the skin is hard. Most winter squash is harvested in September or October in the Northern Hemisphere, before the danger of heavy frosts.

Although winter squashes are grown in many regions, they are relatively economically unimportant, with few exceptions. They are grown extensively in tropical America, Japan, Northern Italy, and certain areas of the United States. The calabazas of the West Indies and the forms grown by the people of Mexico and Central America are not uniform, pure varieties but extremely variable in size, shape, and color. Since these species are normally cross-pollinated, it is now difficult to keep a variety pure.

== Nutritional value ==
Winter squash, all varieties, raw
Nutritional value per 100 g (3.5 oz)
- Energy: 143 kJ (34 kcal)
- Carbohydrates: 8.59g
- Sugars: 2.2 g
- Dietary fiber: 1.5g
- Fat: 0.13 g
- Protein: 0.95 g
Vitamins and minerals
Vitamins	Quantity %DV^{†}
Vitamin A equiv. beta-Carotene lutein zeaxanthin	8% 68 μg 8% 820 μg 38 μg
Thiamine (B1)	3% 0.04 mg
Riboflavin (B2)	5% 0.062 mg
Niacin (B3)	3% 0.5 mg
Pantothenic acid (B5)	4% 0.188 mg
Vitamin B6	9% 0.156 mg
Folate (B9)	6% 24 μg
Vitamin C	14% 12.3 mg
Minerals	Quantity %DV^{†}
Calcium	2% 28 mg
Iron	3% 0.58 mg
Magnesium	4% 15 mg
Manganese	7% 0.164 mg
Phosphorus	2% 24 mg
Potassium	12% 350 mg
- Other constituents: Quantity
- Water: 90 g
- Link to USDA Database entry
- ^{†}Percentages estimated using US recommendations for adults, except for potassium, which is estimated based on expert recommendation from the National Academies.

Raw winter squash (such as acorn or butternut squash) is 90% water, 9% carbohydrates, 1% protein. It contains negligible fat (table), except in the oil-rich seeds. In a 100 gram reference amount, it supplies 34 calories and is a moderate source (10-19% of the Daily Value, DV) of vitamin C (15% DV) and vitamin B6 (12% DV), with no other micronutrients in significant content (table). It is also a source of the provitamin A carotenoid, beta-carotene.

== See also ==
- List of squash and pumpkin dishes
- Three Sisters (agriculture)
- Winter melon
