= Zucchini (disambiguation) =

Zucchini is a type of squash.

It may also refer to:

== Art, entertainment, and media ==
- Zucchini (novel), 1982 children's novel
- The Great Zucchini (born 1970), American children's entertainer
- The Zucchini Warriors, a young adult novel by Gordon Korman

== Food ==
- Stuffed zucchinis, a recipe
- Zucchini flower, an edible flower used in recipes

== People ==
- Luigi Zucchini (1915–1986), Italian ice hockey player
- Mario Zucchini (1910–1997), Italian ice hockey player

== Other uses ==
- Palazzo Zucchini Solimei, Bologna, Renaissance architecture palace, near the Palazzo Aldrovandi
- Zucc, an informal nickname for Mark Zuckerberg used primarily online
- Zucchini, a nickname for queerplatonic partners in some online spaces
- Zucchini yellow mosaic virus, an aphid-borne potyvirus

== See also ==
- Zucco (disambiguation)
- Zuccone (disambiguation)
- Zucconi (disambiguation)
- Zuke (disambiguation)
