= Kamokamo =

Variety of Cucurbita pepo

Kamokamo (kumikumi)
- Kamokamo
- Genus: Cucurbita
- Species: Cucurbita pepo
- Origin: New Zealand

Kamokamo (also known as kumikumi) is a variety of Cucurbita pepo, grown as a summer or winter squash in New Zealand. Commonly used in Māori cuisine, the Kamokamo is a heavily ribbed oblate or prolate shaped stocky fruit with speckled green skin, ripening to an orange colour. It is thought to have been introduced to New Zealand during European settlement around the late 19th century and was readily adopted by Māori, displacing the calabash as a food source. Its name originates from the Māori language.

== Usage ==
The fruit of the Kamokamo is treated as a summer squash and is usually picked when immature. It is prepared in a similar fashion to zucchini, boiled, steamed, roasted, fried and stuffed, with the most common way of preparing them is grating and adding to batter to make fritters. The flowers can also be stuffed and fried. The fruit can also be left to ripen and used like a winter squash, where it is boiled, roasted, or puréed into soups.

Like with the Māori introduced calabash, the mature fruit of the kamokamo can be dried out and made into a storage vessel and was traditionally used to hold the pulp of ripe tutu berries.

== Gallery ==
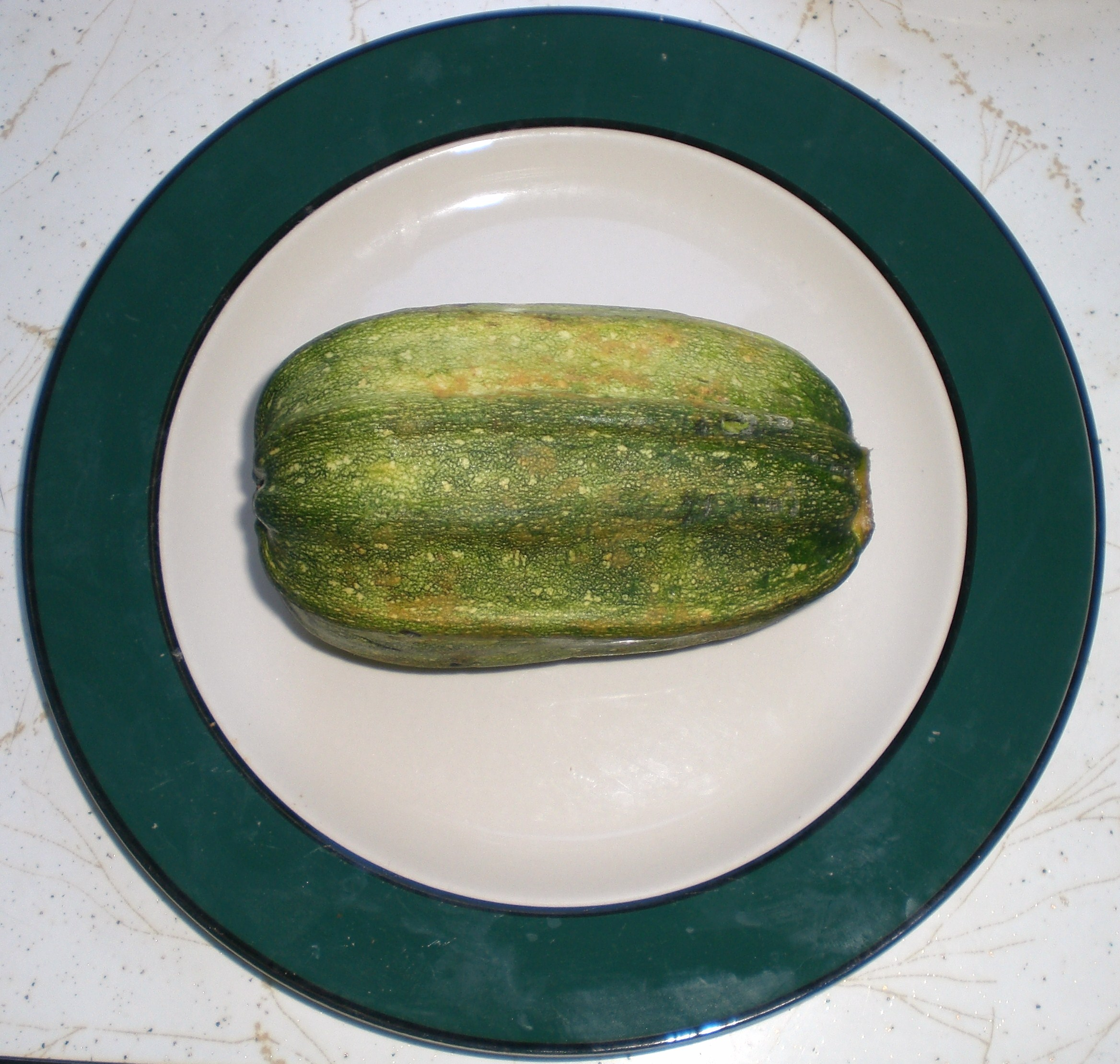
Kamokamo fruit

Immature kamokamo fruit on plant

Kamokamo flower

== See also ==
- Straightneck squash
- Tromboncino
- Zucchini
