= Cucumber (disambiguation) =

A cucumber is an edible fruit commonly used as a culinary vegetable.

Cucumber may also refer to:

== Arts and entertainment ==
- Cucumber (British TV series), a 2015 British television series
- Cucumber (card game), a north European card game of Swedish origin
- Cucumber (Canadian TV series), a Canadian children's television series originally broadcast in the 1970s
- The Cucumbers, a 1980s power pop/new wave band from New Jersey

== Plants ==
- Armenian cucumber, an edible fruit closely related to the common cucumber
- Cucumber tree, several unrelated trees
- Wild cucumber (disambiguation), several species of plants similar to cucumbers

== Other ==
- Cucumber (software), a behavior-driven development tool
- Cucumber, West Virginia, a community in West Virginia
- Cucumber beetle, a type of beetle
- Sea cucumber (Holothuroidea), a type of animal
- "Cucumber King" (Nyaung-u Sawrahan), a ruler of the kingdom of Pagan in what is now Burma
- The top level on the 1 to 4 EHS scale developed by the European Association of Urology

== See also ==
- Cuke (disambiguation)
