= Zuccone (disambiguation) =

Zuccone may refer to:

- Zuccone, 15th century sculpture by Donatello
- Corno Zuccone, a mountain of Lombardy, Italy
- Zuccone star system, one of the Features of the Marvel Universe

== See also ==
- Zucco (disambiguation)
- Zucconi (disambiguation)
- Zucchini (disambiguation)
