= Zuko (name) =

Zuko is a given name and surname. Notable people with the name include:

== People ==
=== Given names ===
- Zuko Džumhur (1920–1989), Bosnian writer, painter, and caricaturist
- Zuko Mdunyelwa (born 1999), South African soccer player
- Zuko Godlimpi (born 1992), South African politician

=== Stage names ===
- Eddie Zuko, stage name of Heriberto Xavier Culebro (born 1993), Chicano singer-songwriter and rapper

=== Fictional characters ===
- Zuko, major character in Avatar: The Last Airbender
- Danny Zuko, character in the musical and film Grease
- Zuko Khumalo, major character in Heart of the Hunter

== See also ==
- Zucco (disambiguation)
- Zuco 103, a Dutch musical ensemble that plays music in the style of Brazil
- Zuke (disambiguation)
