= Bicyclette Cookshop =

Restaurant in Naples, FL, by Kayla Pfeiffer

Coordinates: 26.2524°N 81.8053°W

- Location in Florida

Restaurant information
- Established: November 15, 2023
- Owners: Kayla Pfeiffer, Louie Mele, Colleen Dunavan, Patrick Wenning
- Head chef: Kayla Pfeiffer
- Food type: New American
- Dress code: Casual
- Location: 819 Vanderbilt Beach Road, Naples, Florida, 34108, United States
- Reservations: Yes
- Website: bicyclettecookshop.com

Bicyclette Cookshop is a restaurant in Naples, Florida, specializing in New American cuisine. Located at 819 Vanderbilt Beach Road in the Pavilion Shopping Center, it opened on November 15, 2023, and is owned by executive chef Kayla Pfeiffer and restaurateur Louie Mele. The restaurant is recognized for its creative menu, featuring small plates, shareables, and entrees that utilize fresh, local ingredients.

== History ==
Bicyclette Cookshop occupies the former site of Fit & Fuel Café, a cyclist-friendly eatery previously owned by Mele. In August 2023, renovations began to transform the space into a venue reflecting Pfeiffer's culinary vision, with the restaurant opening to the public in November 2023. Pfeiffer, who has worked at establishments such as The French Brasserie and Bar Tulia, sought to blend traditional and modern culinary elements. The name "Bicyclette," French for "bicycle," references Mele's ownership of the neighboring Naples Cyclery, while "Cookshop" underscores Pfeiffer's contemporary approach.

In January 2024, Pfeiffer won the season finale of the Food Network series Chopped. She was also named a semifinalist in the "Emerging Chef" category of the James Beard Foundation Awards in 2025, a notable recognition in the culinary field. In February 2025, Bicyclette Cookshop was included in USA Today's Restaurants of the Year list for its innovative cuisine and impact on the Naples dining scene.

== Cuisine and ambiance ==
Bicyclette Cookshop's menu focuses on New American cuisine, offering small plates and shareables such as zucchini blossoms stuffed with ricotta and nduja, alongside entrees like chicken schnitzel. The restaurant incorporates seasonal, locally sourced ingredients, reflecting Pfeiffer's training at The Culinary Institute of America. The interior features modern design elements with wood tones and neutral colors, fostering a casual yet refined atmosphere. It serves lunch and dinner daily, with outdoor seating and a full bar available.

== Reception ==
Bicyclette Cookshop has been well-received for its inventive dishes and welcoming environment. Critics have commended Pfeiffer's ability to reinterpret comfort food with a sophisticated twist. Its designation as one of USA Today's 2025 Restaurants of the Year underscores its growing reputation. Popular menu items among patrons include the zucchini blossoms, ceviche, and soft serve dessert with olive oil.
