= Delegado Zucco =

Brazilian politician

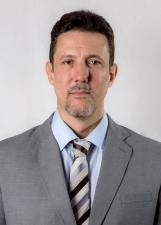

State Deputy of Rio Grande do Sul
- Incumbent
- Assumed office 2022
- Constituency: At-large

Personal details
- Born: 17 December 1970 (age 55) Alegrete, Rio Grande do Sul, Brazil
- Party: REP (2018–present)
- Education: Federal University of Rio Grande do Sul
- Website: delegadozucco.com.br

Rodrigo Lorenzini Zucco, better known as Delegado Zucco (born December 17, 1970, in Alegrete), is a Brazilian politician from the Republicanos party.

Zucco holds a law degree from the Federal University of Rio Grande do Sul (UFRGS). He was first admitted in the police service in Santa Catarina and later in Rio Grande do Sul.

In the 2022 elections, he was elected to the State Parliament of Rio Grande do Sul for the Republicanos party with 59,648 votes.

Rodrigo Zucco is the brother of Luciano Lorenzini Zucco, known as Tenente-Coronel Zucco, a federal deputy of the Liberal Party for Rio Grande do Sul.
