= Zuke =

Zuke may refer to:

- Zucchini, a summer squash often nicknamed "zuke"
- Mike Zuke (born 1954), retired professional ice hockey centreman
- Bill Supplee (1903–1966), American educator and college athlete (nicknamed "Zuke")
- Fukujinzuke, Japanese pickled condiments

== See also ==
- Zucchini (disambiguation)
- Cuke (disambiguation)
