= Tromboncino (squash) =

Cultivar of Cucurbita moschata

Cucurbita moschata 'Tromboncino'
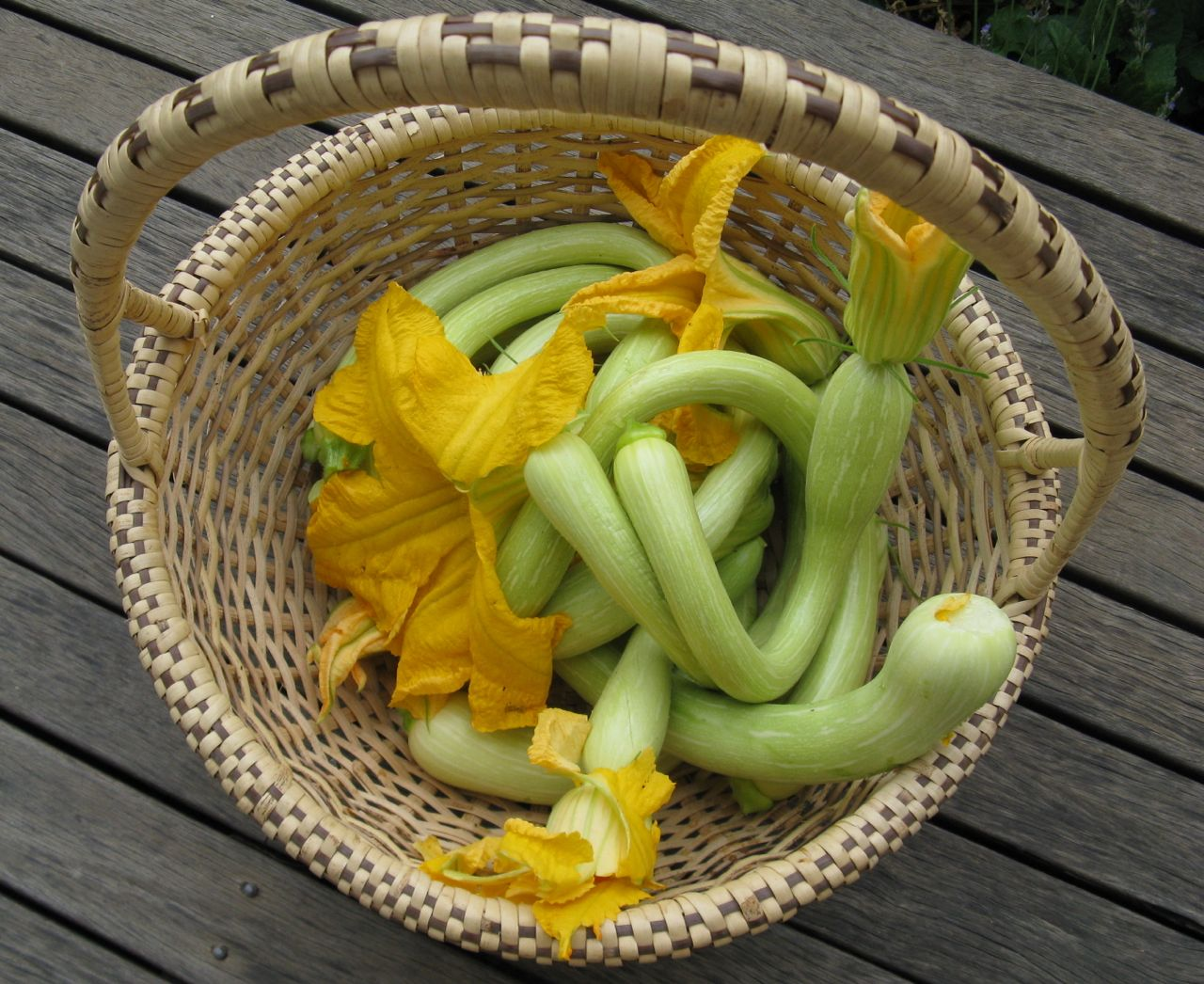
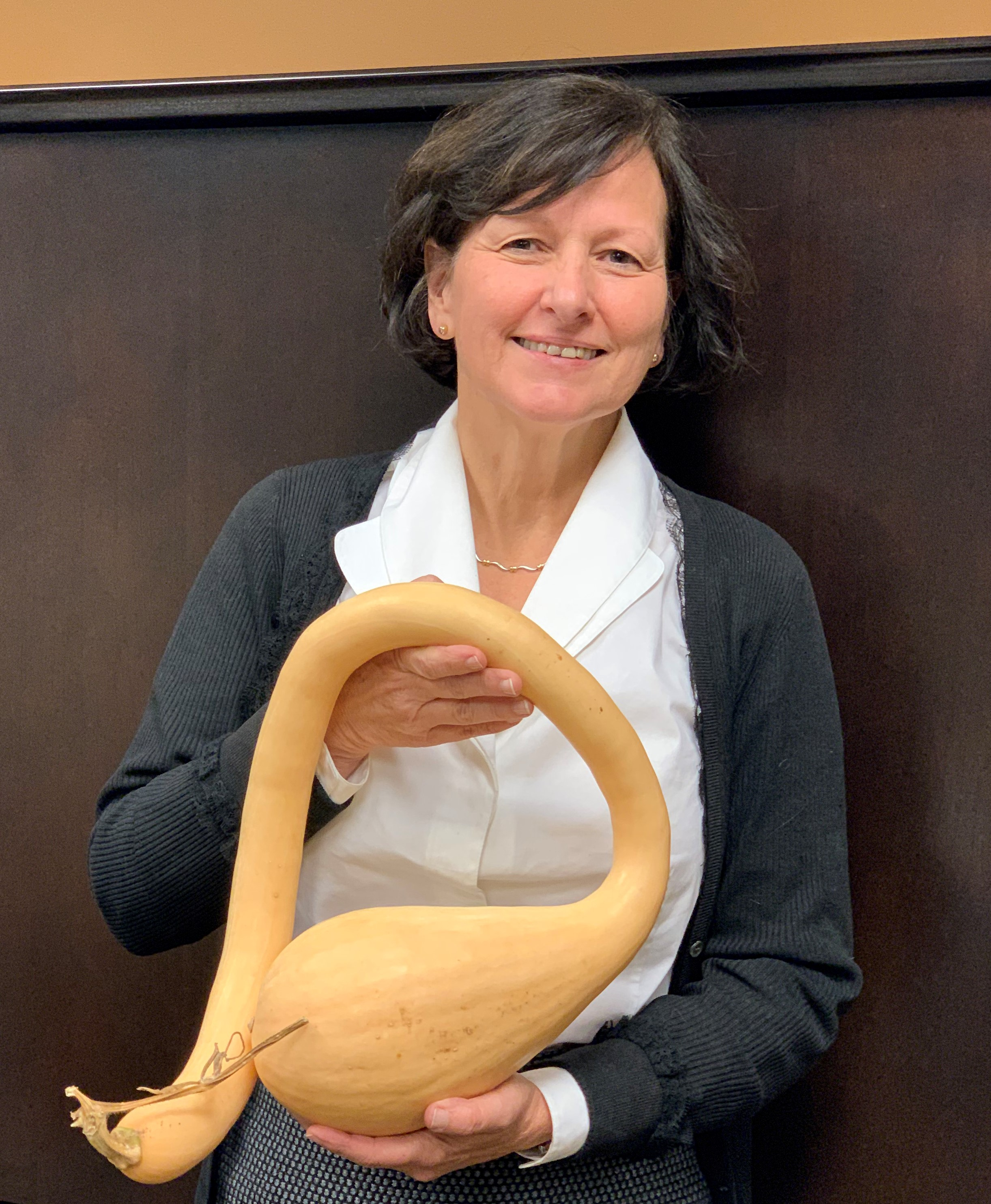
- Tromboncino summer squash, with blossoms Rampicante is beige when mature.
- Species: Cucurbita moschata
- Cultivar: Tromboncino
- Origin: Liguria, Italy

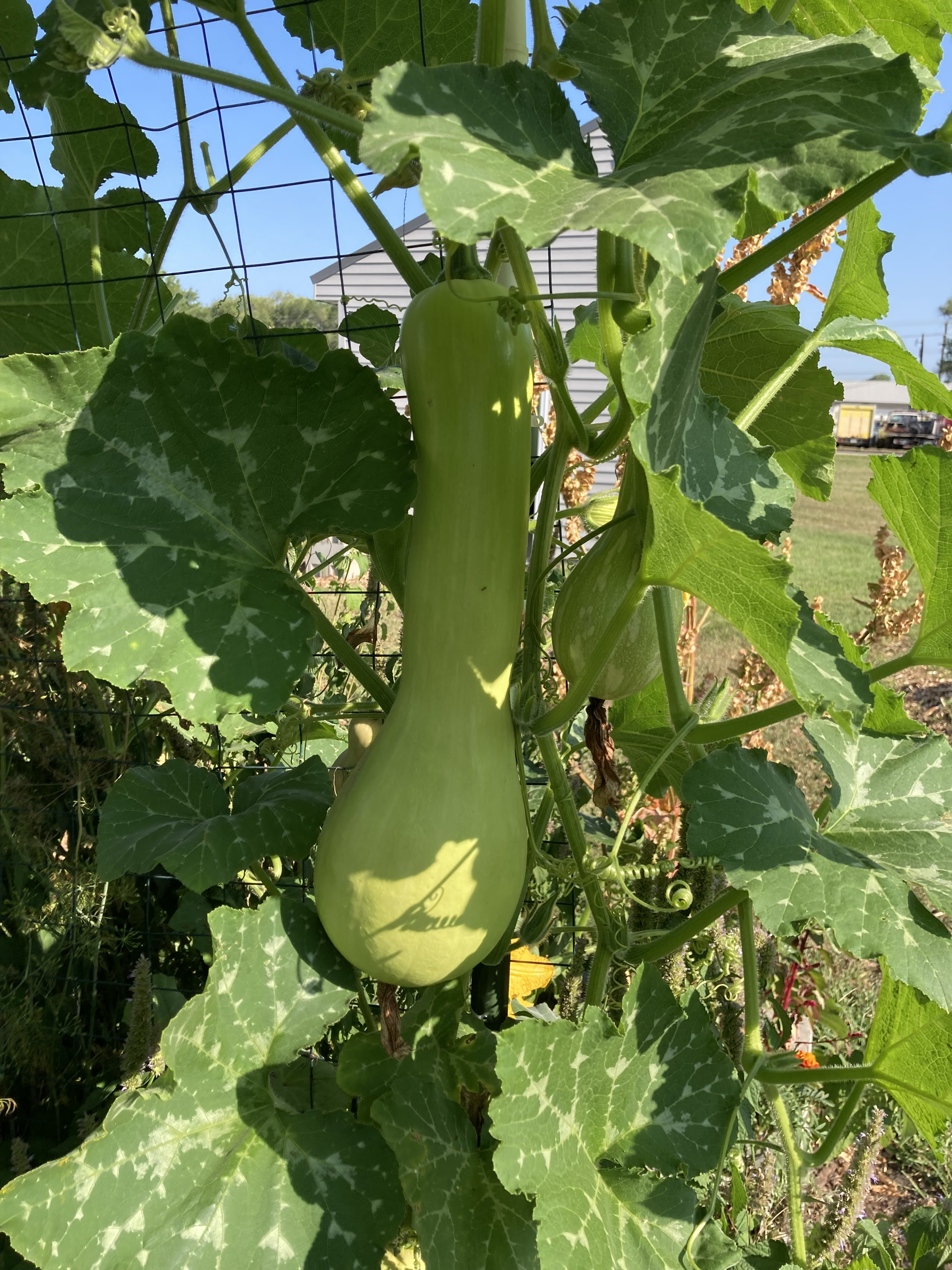
Tromboncino squash

Tromboncino (Italian: [trombonˈtʃiːno]), also known as zucchetta (Italian: [tsukˈketta]), is a type of squash most often used as a summer squash.

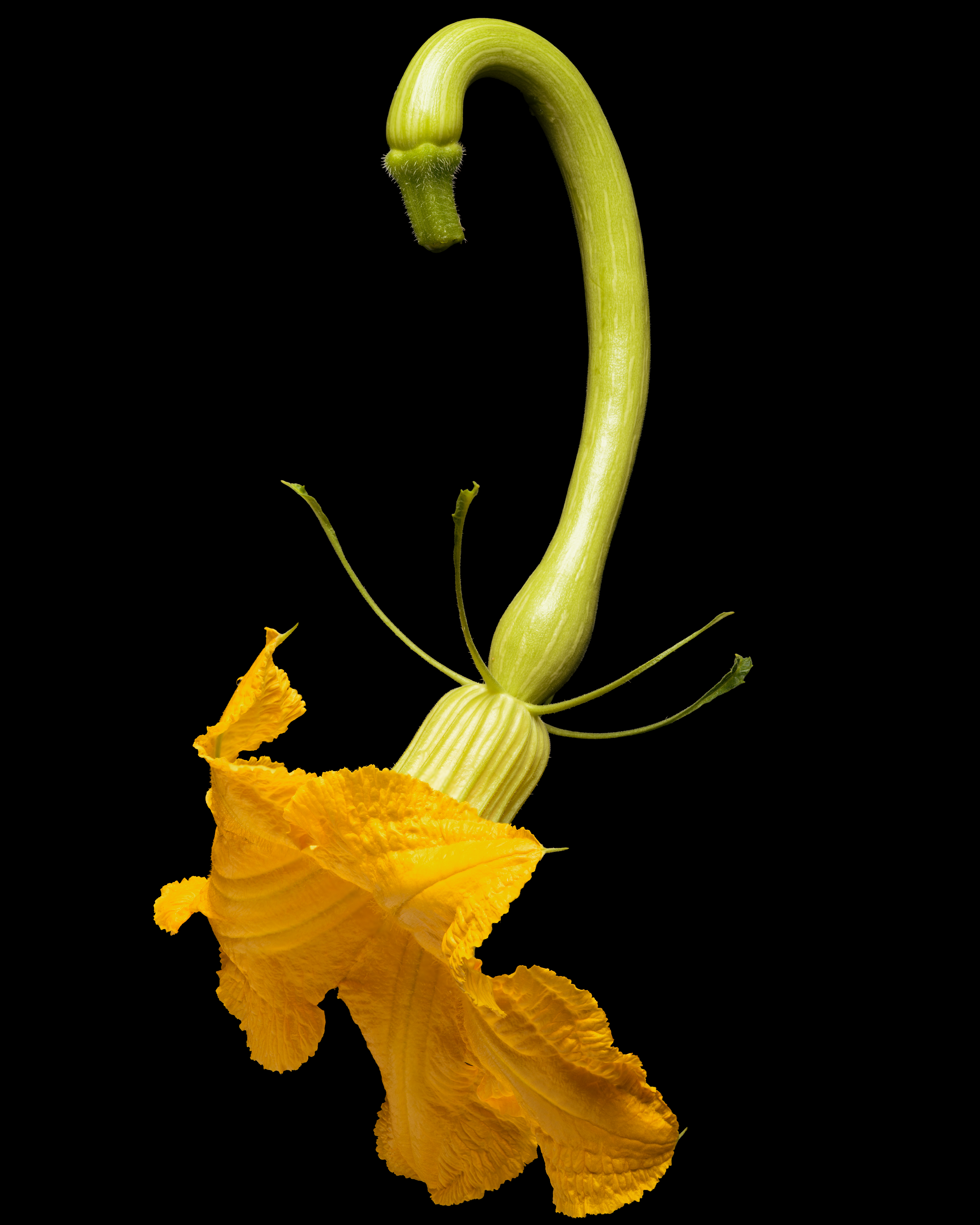
A 12" long flowering Trombocino squash grown to tender summer squash

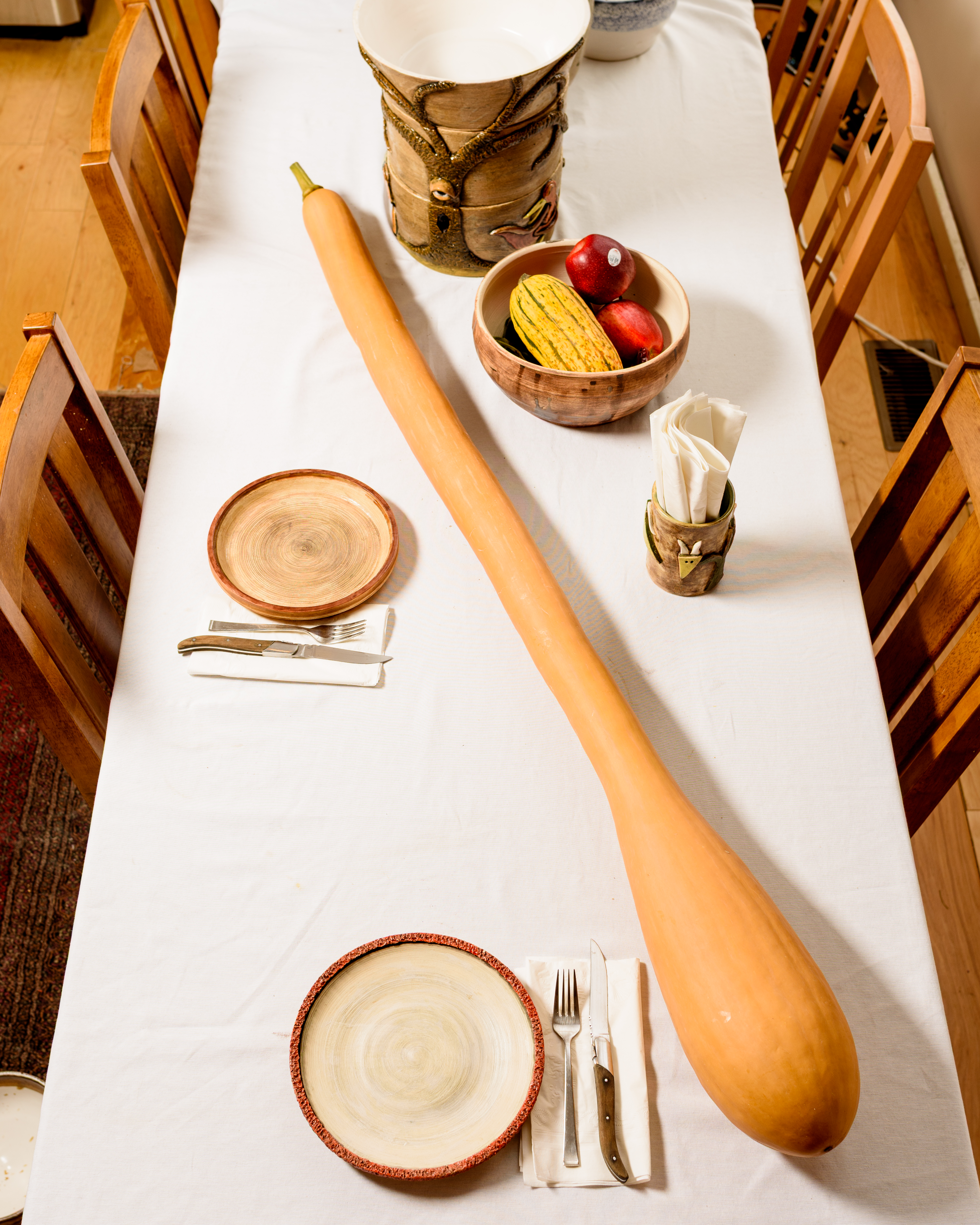
Trombocino Squash allowed to mature into winter squash

== Background ==
While nearly all summer squash are cultivars of Cucurbita pepo, tromboncino is a cultivar of Cucurbita moschata. The vining growth habit is similar to many winter squashes, but unlike most other summer squash. It is more tolerant to some common summer squash pests, including squash vine borer, squash bugs, and powdery mildew, than the more commonly grown, bushy, C. pepo summer squash cultivars. The plants are slower to start producing than some C. pepo types. The fruit color is usually pale green, fading to beige upon maturity, and it is picked around one foot long for summer squash. It is an heirloom, originally from Liguria, and remains popular throughout Italy and abroad. Tromboncino squash can be left to mature into a winter squash; such is often compared to a watery butternut squash. If left to ripen, the fruits can grow over three feet in length. Its flesh is delicious roasted or when prepared in a stew or soup.

Tromboncino is known by many other common names as well, including: zucchetta rampicante, zucchino rampicante, climbing zucchini, climbing crookneck, trombolino d'albenga, trombetta and serpentine squash.

== See also ==
- Aehobak
