= Marrow (vegetable) =

Fruit of the squash variety

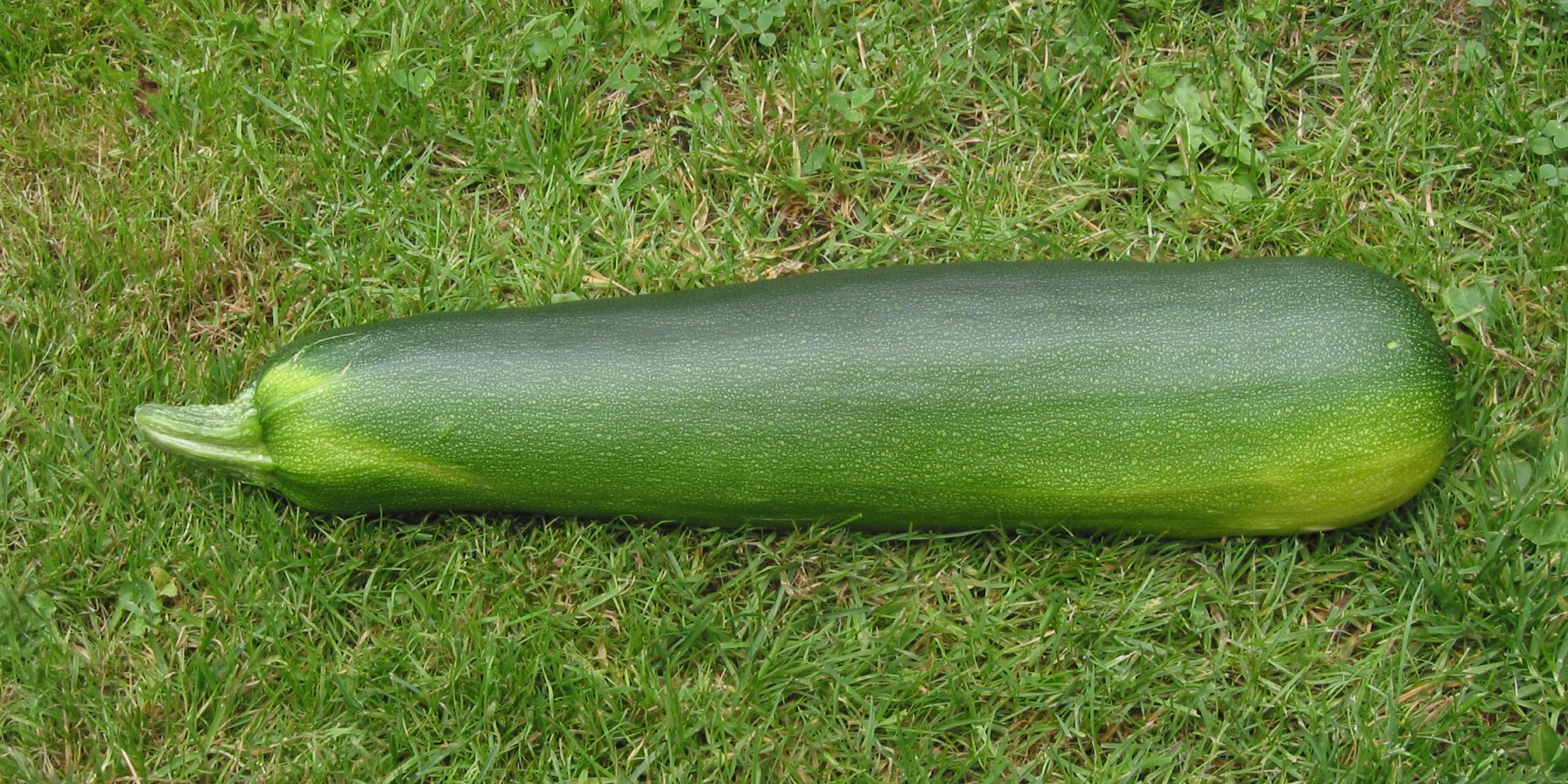
- Type: Fruit
- Place of origin: England

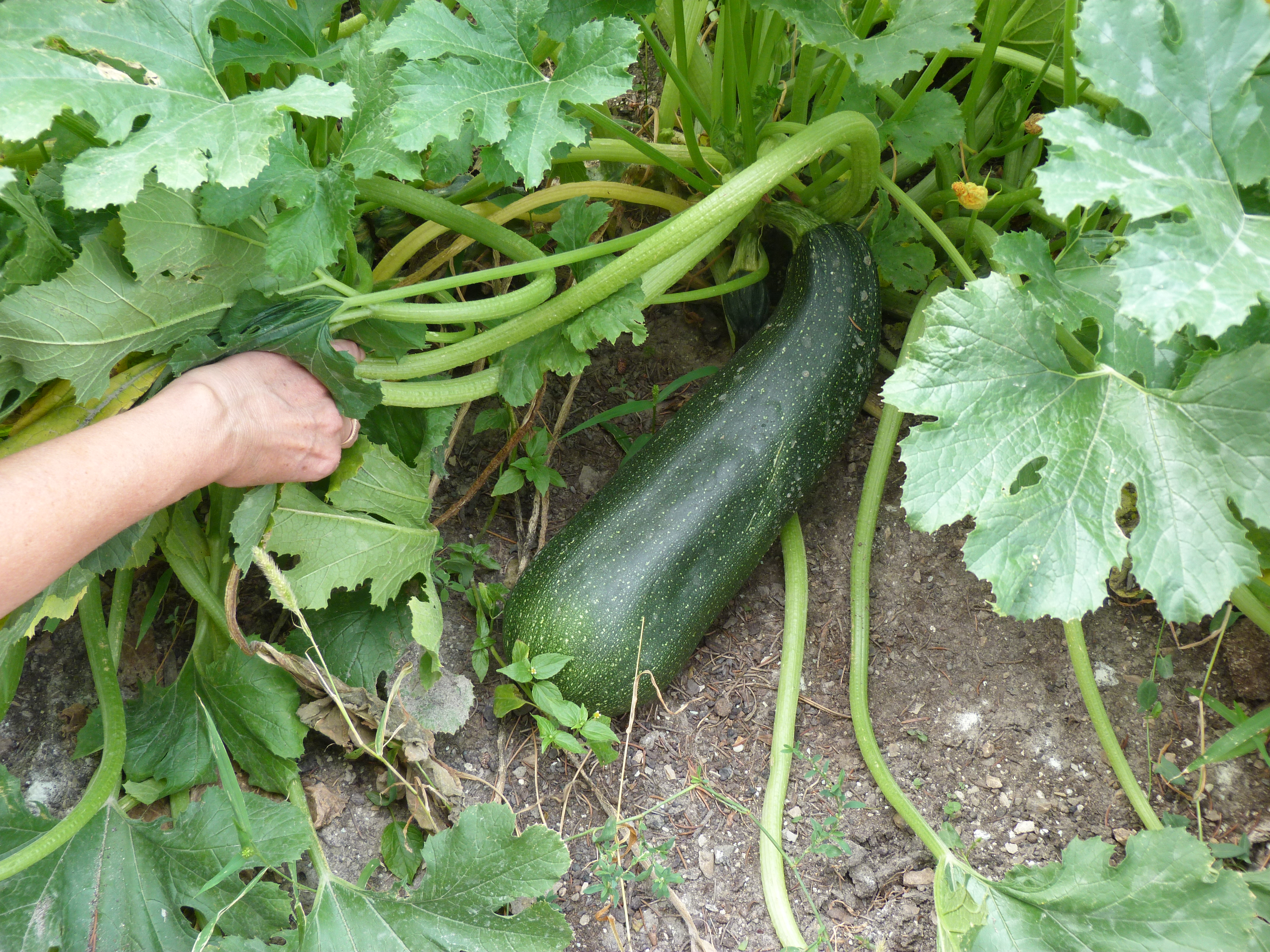
Growing marrow

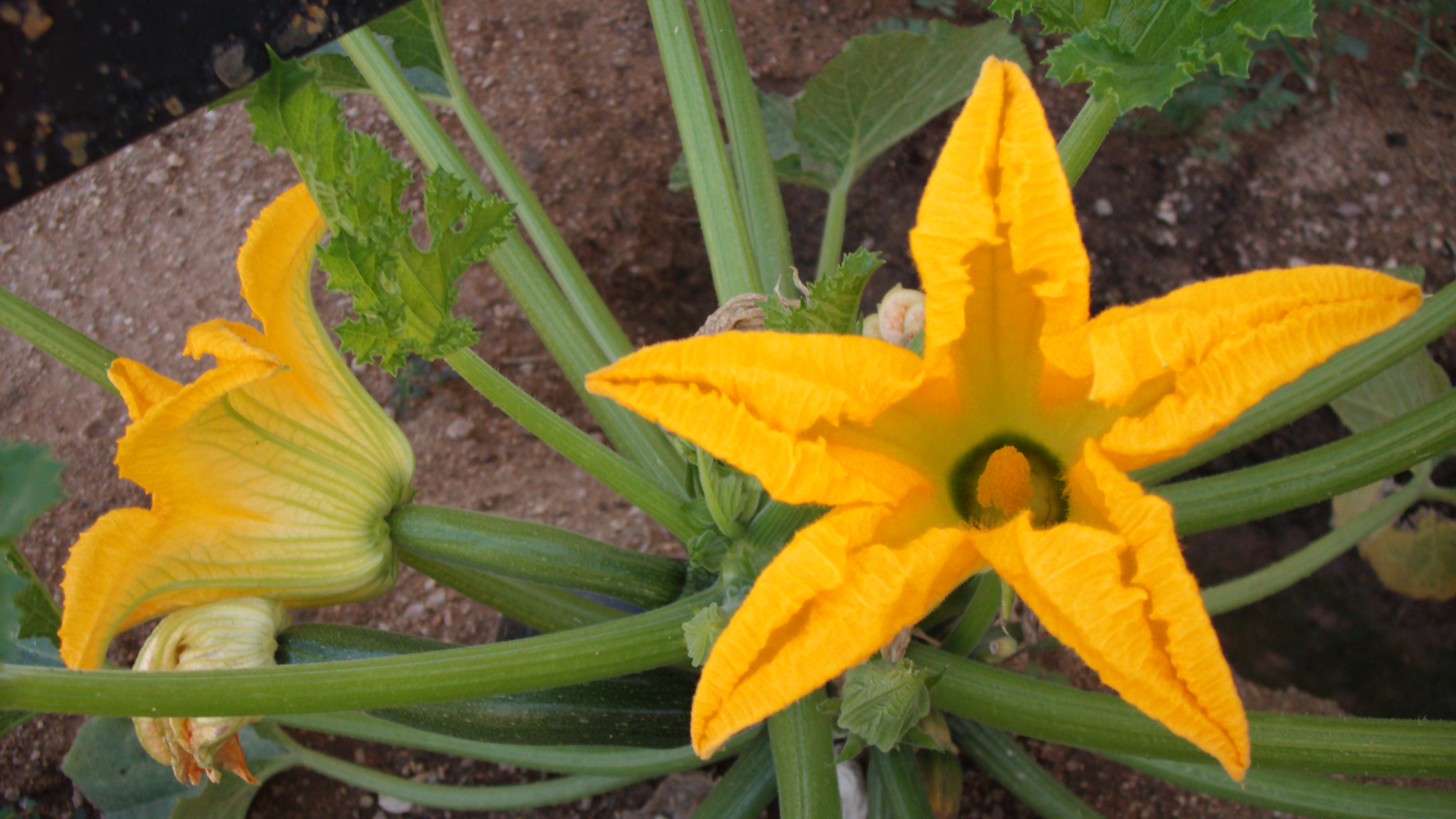
Flower of marrow

A marrow is the mature fruit of certain Cucurbita pepo cultivars used as a vegetable. It is similar to a zucchini. The immature fruit of the same or similar cultivars is called courgette (in Britain, Iran, Ireland, France, the Netherlands, Singapore, Malaysia and New Zealand) or zucchini (in North America, Japan, Australia, Czechia, Italy, Germany and Austria). Like courgettes, marrows are oblong, green squash, but marrows have a firm rind and a neutral flavour, making them useful as edible casings for mincemeat and other stuffings. They can be stored for several weeks after harvest (like pumpkins and other winter squash), to be processed for food when required. They are a vegetable used in Great Britain and areas with significant British influence, though their popularity is waning in favor of immature summer squash like courgette.

Giant marrows are grown competitively in the United Kingdom, where the term "marrow" is often restricted to the striped, thick-skinned cultivar.

In a culinary context, marrows are a vegetable; usually cooked and presented as a savory dish or accompaniment. Botanically, marrows are fruit, a type of botanical berry, being the swollen ovary of the marrow flower. Marrows, like all squash, have their ancestry in the Americas.

== History ==
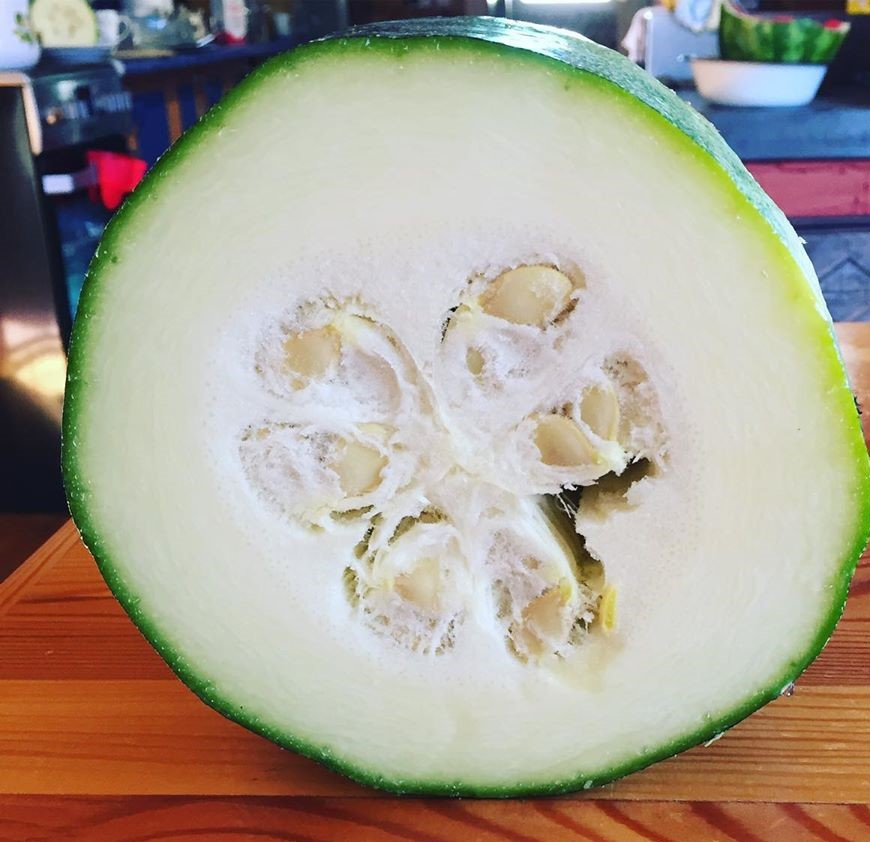
Marrow cutaway

According to the Oxford English Dictionary, the first mention of vegetable marrows dates to 1822, zucchini to 1916, and courgettes to 1931. Before the introduction of Cucurbita species from the New World, marrow signified the immature, edible fruits of Lagenaria, a cucurbit gourd of African origin widely grown since antiquity for eating when immature and for drying as watertight receptacles when grown to maturity.

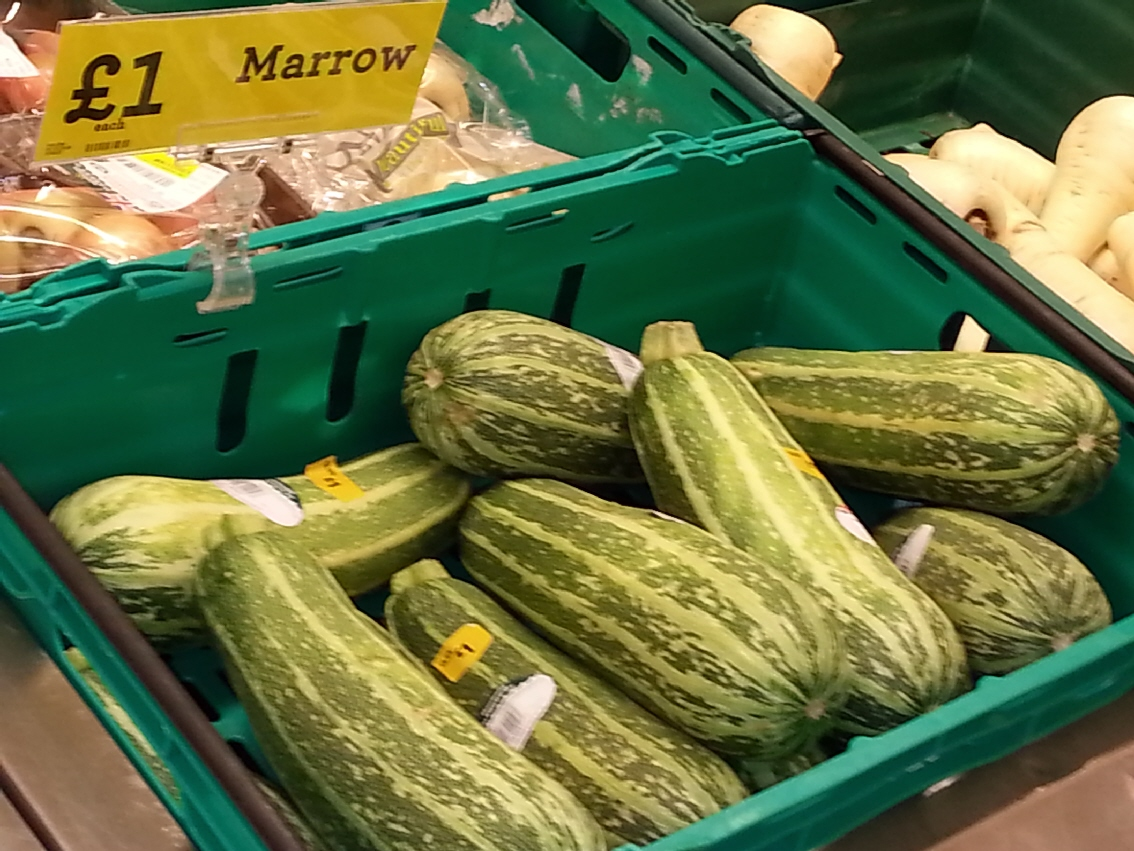
Vegetable marrows (distinct from courgettes) on sale in a British supermarket

Marrows are commonly cultivated in the British Isles, and the term "marrow" for the plant and for the fruit is current there, especially for the striped, thicker-skinned cultivar. However, both in North America (since the 1920s) and in Britain (since the 1960s), thinner-skinned immature marrows have gained popularity due to their tender skin and distinct flavour. Hedrick (1928) in his book The Vegetables of New York, describes the "English Vegetable Marrow" as "one of the earliest forms of marrow squash grown, but has never been exceedingly popular in this country".

The fashion in Britain for eating immature marrows, called "courgettes" in British English, is relatively recent. Sudell (1966) does not mention courgettes, although he has a section on "vegetable marrow", noting both trailing (vining) and bush types and saying "cut when young". Witham Fogg (1966) wrote "Courgettes These are really very tender baby marrows which have long been popular in France. ... Cooked and eaten with butter they form a very palatable dish." He devotes a page and a half to marrows and less than half a page to courgettes, which he clearly regards as something new to Britain.

As of 2026, the heaviest marrow on record weighed 116.4 kilograms (256.6 lb) and was grown by Vincent Sjodin (UK) for entry in the CANNA UK National Giant Vegetables Championships, held at the Three Counties Showground in Malvern, Worcestershire, UK, on 23 September 2021.

== Nutrition ==
Marrows (similar to raw young zucchinis) are low in food energy, having 21 calories in a reference amount of 100 g (3.5 oz). They are a rich source of vitamin A and vitamin C, with a moderate content of potassium (see zucchini nutrition section).

== Toxicology ==
Members of the plant family Cucurbitaceae, which includes zucchini, marrows, pumpkins and cucumbers, can contain toxins called cucurbitacins. These are chemically classified as steroids; they defend the plants from predators, and have a bitter taste to humans. Cultivated cucurbitaceae are bred for low levels of the toxin and are safe to eat. However, ornamental pumpkins can have high levels of cucurbitacins, and such ornamental plants can cross-fertilise edible cucurbitaceae – any such cross-fertilised seeds used by the gardener for growing food in the following season can therefore potentially produce bitter and toxic fruit. Also, dry weather conditions or irregular watering can stress the plant and favour the production of the toxin, which is not destroyed by cooking.

In August 2015, a 79-year-old German man and his wife ate a marrow grown by a neighbour. The couple noted the unusually bitter taste. Shortly afterwards they were both admitted to a Heidenheim hospital, apparently with symptoms of a gastrointestinal infection. The wife, who had eaten a smaller portion, survived, while the husband died. Toxicological analysis of the meal confirmed the presence of cucurbitacin.

== In popular culture ==
"The Marrow Song", also known as "Oh! What a Beauty", was a British song published on 16 December 1952, with words and music by Edrich Siebert. The innuendo-laden song was recorded for Decca by Billy Cotton and his Band with vocals by Alan Breeze and The Bandits on 1 December that year, under the title "The Marrow Song (Oh What a Beauty)". As well as being issued on a single in January 1953, it was included on Cotton's 1955 Saucy Songs EP. In 2013, the recording was featured in a UK television advertisement for the Co-operative supermarket. The song was performed in the 1969 film Kes. This version of The Marrow Song is used at several points in the 2024 video game Thank Goodness You're Here!

Marrows also play an important role in the 2005 animated film Wallace & Gromit: The Curse of the Were-Rabbit. In this film, the character of Gromit is devoted to growing a large marrow. The marrow is eventually destroyed when he uses it to lure the Were-Rabbit. The marrow also appears in the video game based on the film; Gromit can control the marrow's growth by adjusting factors such as soil pH, greenhouse temperature, and water flow, as well as by purchasing fertilizers to increase its size.

Agatha Christie's detective Hercule Poirot often expresses his desire to retire and grow marrows, accomplishing his dream briefly in The Murder of Roger Ackroyd.
