= Gem squash =

Variety of summer squash

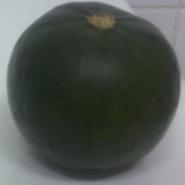

Gem squash (Cucurbita pepo var. pepo) is a variety of summer squash that may have been domesticated from two wild varieties; Cucurbita texana found in the southern and central United States and Cucurbita fraterna found in Mexico. It bears notable similarities to Tatume squash or Calabacita, a Cucurbita pepo variety widely grown in Mexico and parts of Texas with a similar vining or climbing and fruiting habit The dark green spherical fruit, when fully ripe, is about the size of a tennis ball. The young fruit is often harvested before it is fully ripe when it has a more delicate texture and flavor.

Gem squash is grown widely in South Africa, and is commonly served as a vegetable, often boiled or baked.
