= Cuke =

Cuke may refer to:

- "Cuke", a nickname for Cucumber

== People ==
- Michelle Bush-Cuke (born 1961), Caymanian long-distance runner
- Cuke Barrows (1883–1955), American baseball outfielder

== See also ==
- Çükəş, a village in the municipality of Sipiyəpart in the Astara Rayon of Azerbaijan
- Cucumber (disambiguation)
- Sea cucumber, a type of echinoderm marine animal
- Zuke (disambiguation)
