= Summer squash =

Squashes harvested when immature

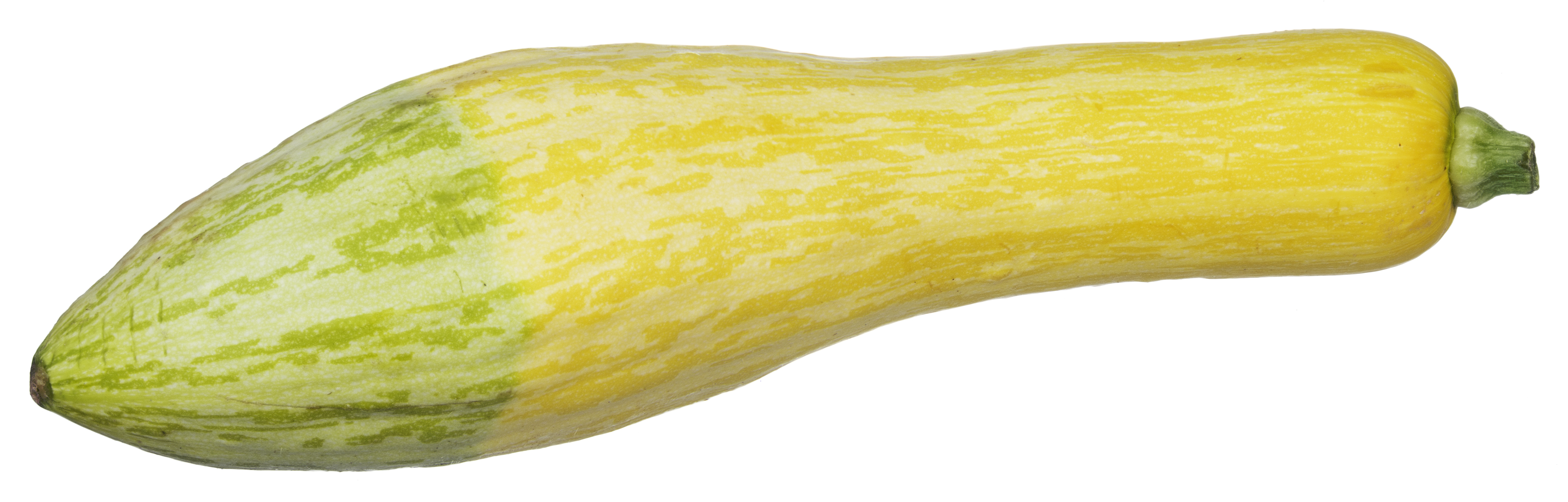
- 'Zephyr', a variety of straightnecked summer squash

Nutritional value per 100 g (3.5 oz)
- Energy: 20 kcal (84 kJ)
- Carbohydrates: 4.1 g
- Sugars: 2.0 g
- Dietary fiber: 2 g
- Fat: 0 g
- Protein: 1 g
Vitamins and minerals
Vitamins	Quantity %DV^{†}
Vitamin A equiv.	10% 90 μg
Vitamin C	20% 18.4 mg
Minerals	Quantity %DV^{†}
Calcium	2% 20 mg
Iron	2% 0.37 mg
Sodium	0% 0 mg
- ^{†}Percentages estimated using US recommendations for adults.

Summer squash can either refer to a squash plant with fruit that is harvested when immature, or the fruit itself. The word "summer" reflects their early harvest period and short storage life, in contrast to winter squashes. Some Cucurbita species and varieties are cultivated for both "summer" and "winter" fruit.

== Cultivation ==
Summer squash often have a bushy growth habit, unlike the rambling vines of many winter squash varieties.

The varieties grown for use as summer squash vary by region and culture but include types from each of the five Cucurbita species generally acknowledged as domesticated.

The species Cucurbita pepo is thought to include the greatest diversity of summer squash varieties.

=== Summer squash varieties by species ===
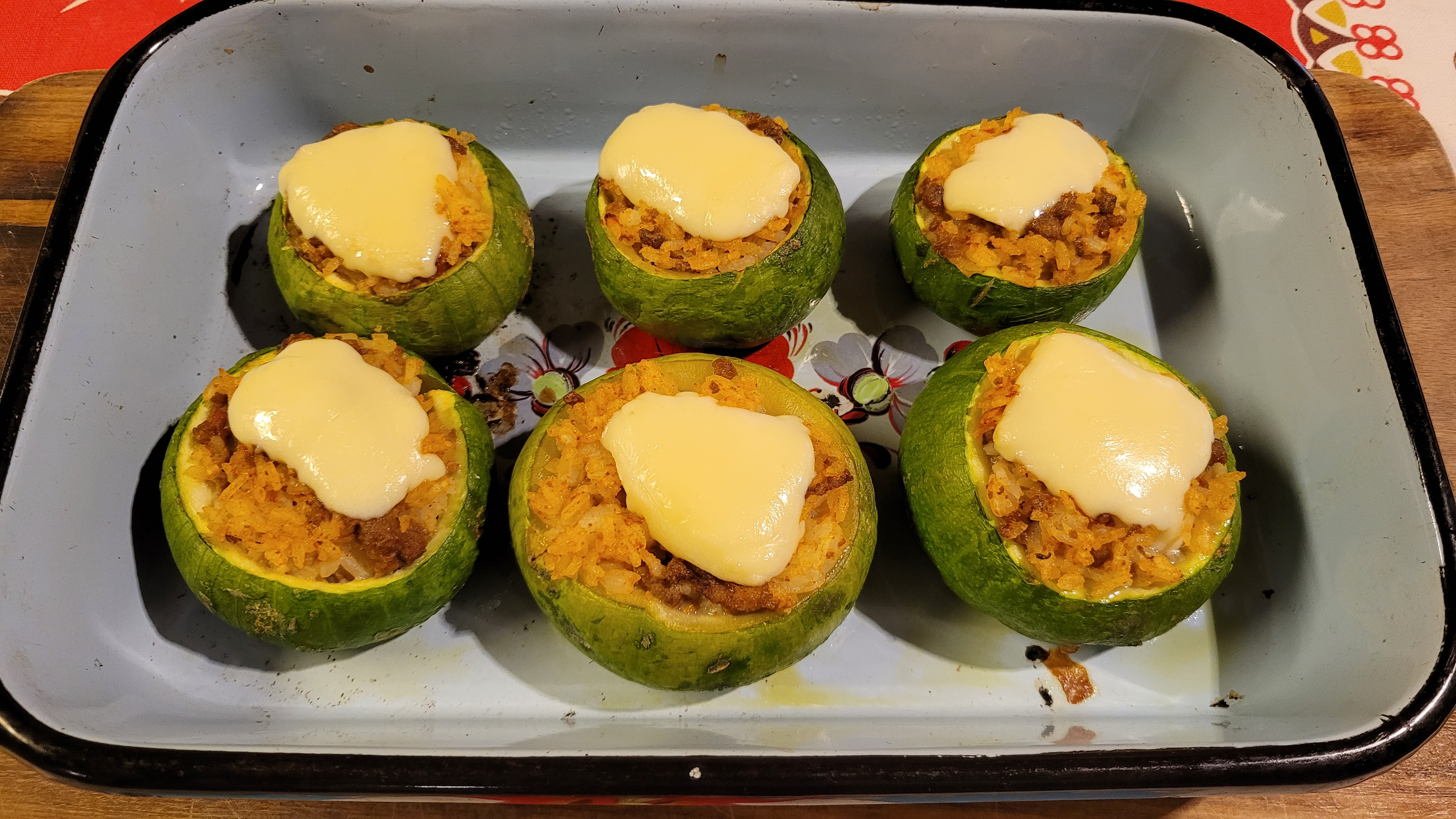
Zapallito relleno made by baking zapallito (C. maxima) summer squash stuffed with corn, meat, and mozzarella cheese.

Cucurbita argyrosperma

- Pipián or pipián fresco

Cucurbita ficifolia

Cucurbita maxima varieties:

- Zapallito cultivar group

Cucurbita moschata varieties:

- Aehobak
- Tromboncino or zucchetta

Cucurbita pepo varieties:

- Crookneck squash
- Gem squash
- Kamokamo
- Pattypan squash
- Straightneck squash
- Zucchini (courgette) and marrow, respectively immature and mature fruits of the same variety

== History ==
In the journals of Lewis and Clark, on October 12, 1804, Clark recorded that the Arikara tribe raised "great quantities of Corn Beens Simmins, &c." Clark also used the spelling simlin in his journal entries. Simlin, variously spelled simblin, symnel, cymling, cimnel (Thomas Jefferson's spelling) and simnel were words for summer squash, particularly Cucurbita pepo ssp. pepo, common name pattypan squash. The word simnel was used because of the visual similarity between the squash and the simnel cake.

== Gallery ==
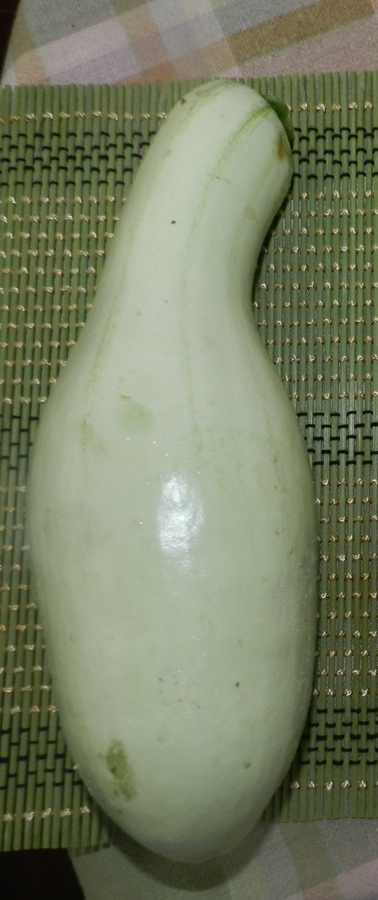
Pipián fresco (Cucurbita argyrosperma)

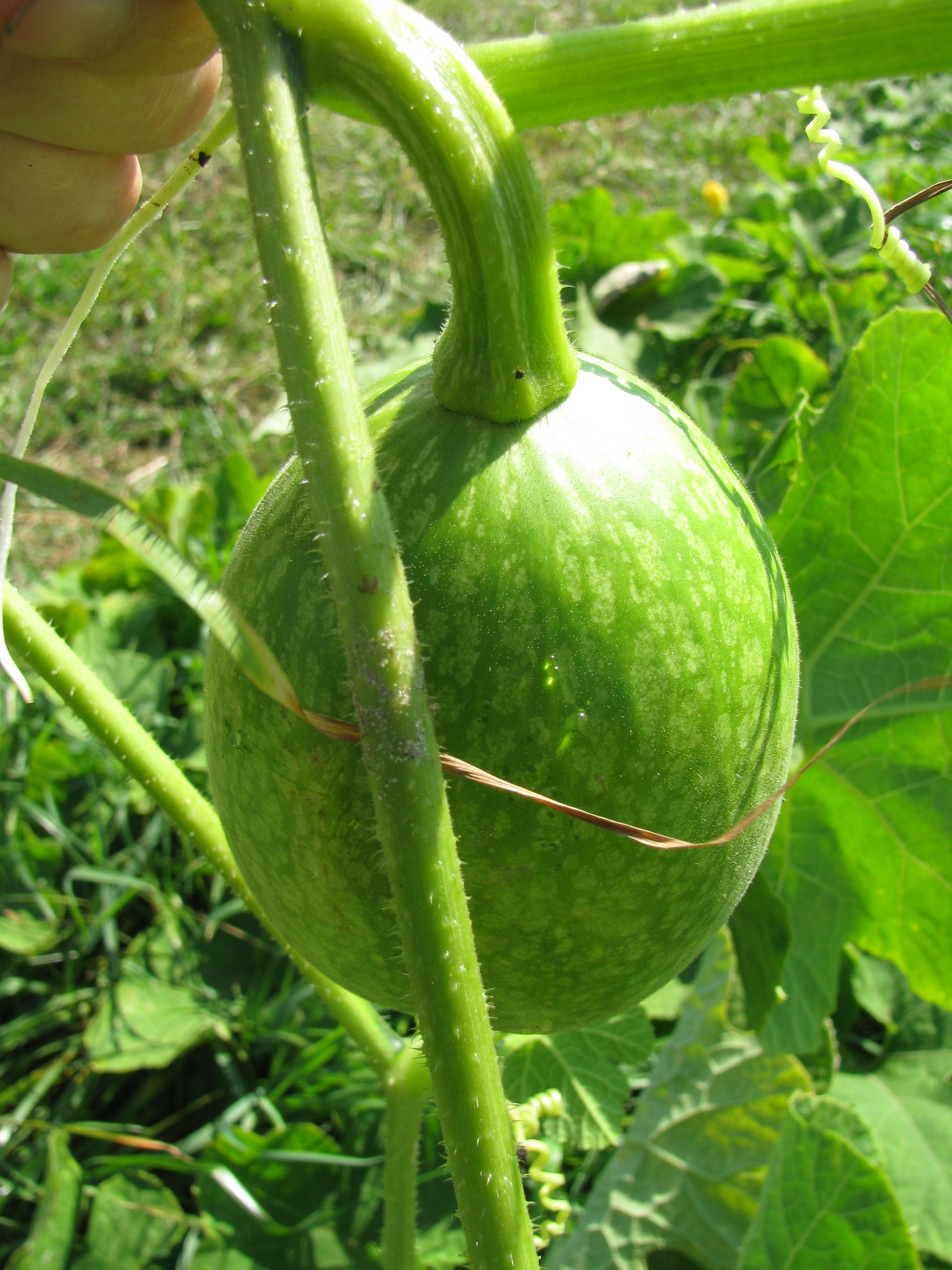
Chilacayote or shark fin melon (Cucurbita ficifolia)

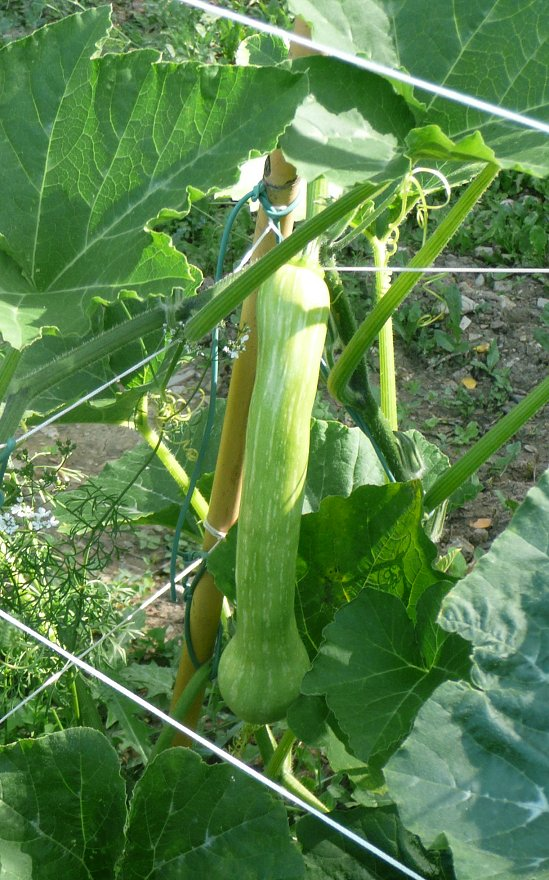
Trombetta d'Albenga (Cucurbita moschata)

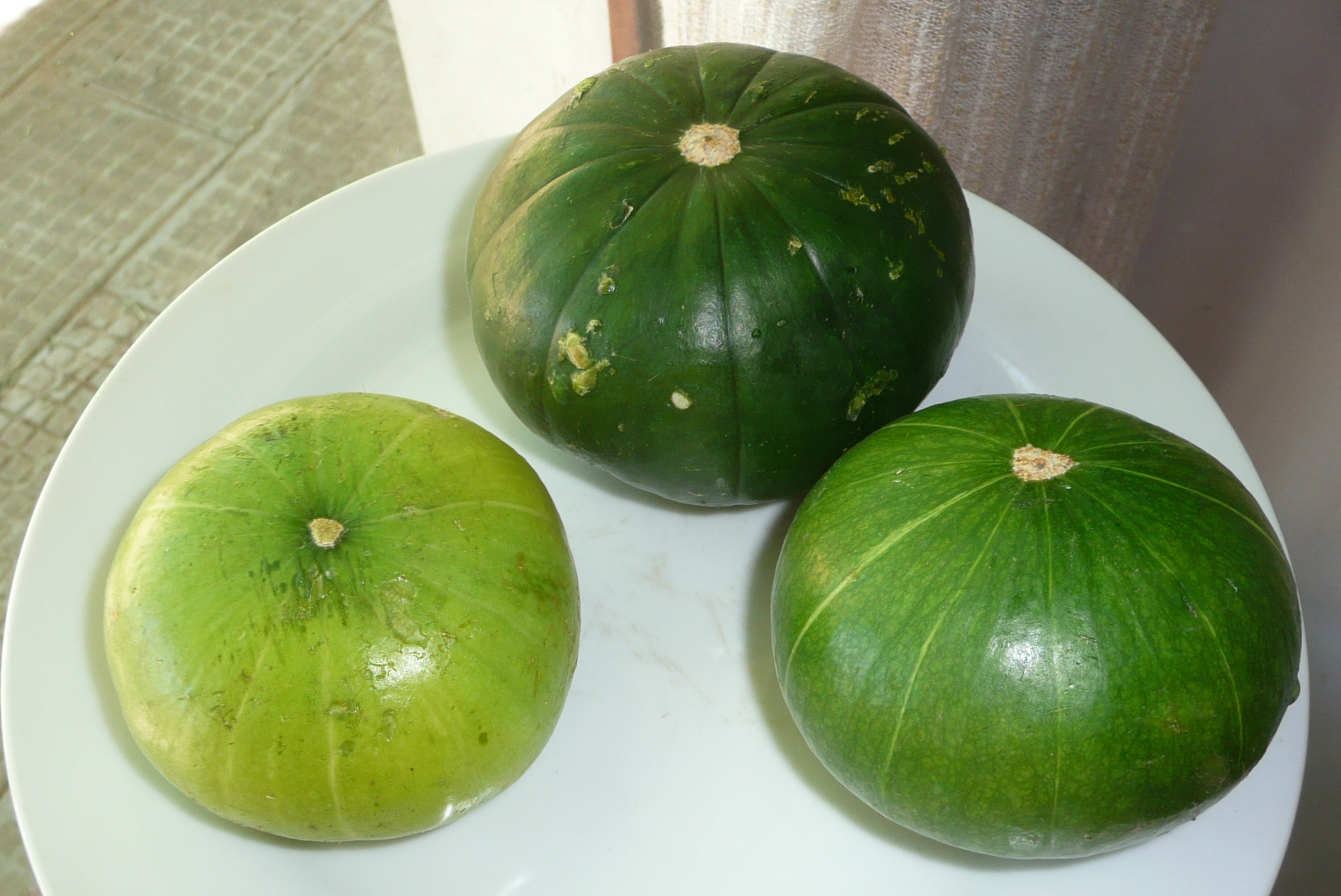
Zapallito (Cucurbita maxima)

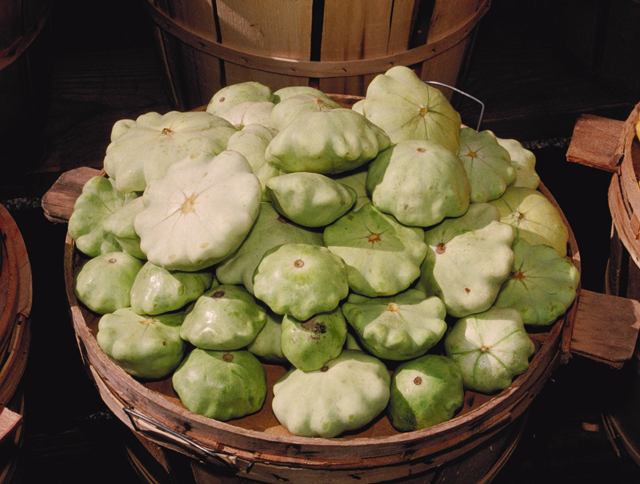
Pattypan squash (Cucurbita pepo)
