= Corno Zuccone =

Mountain in Italy

Coordinates: 45°54′N 9°32′E

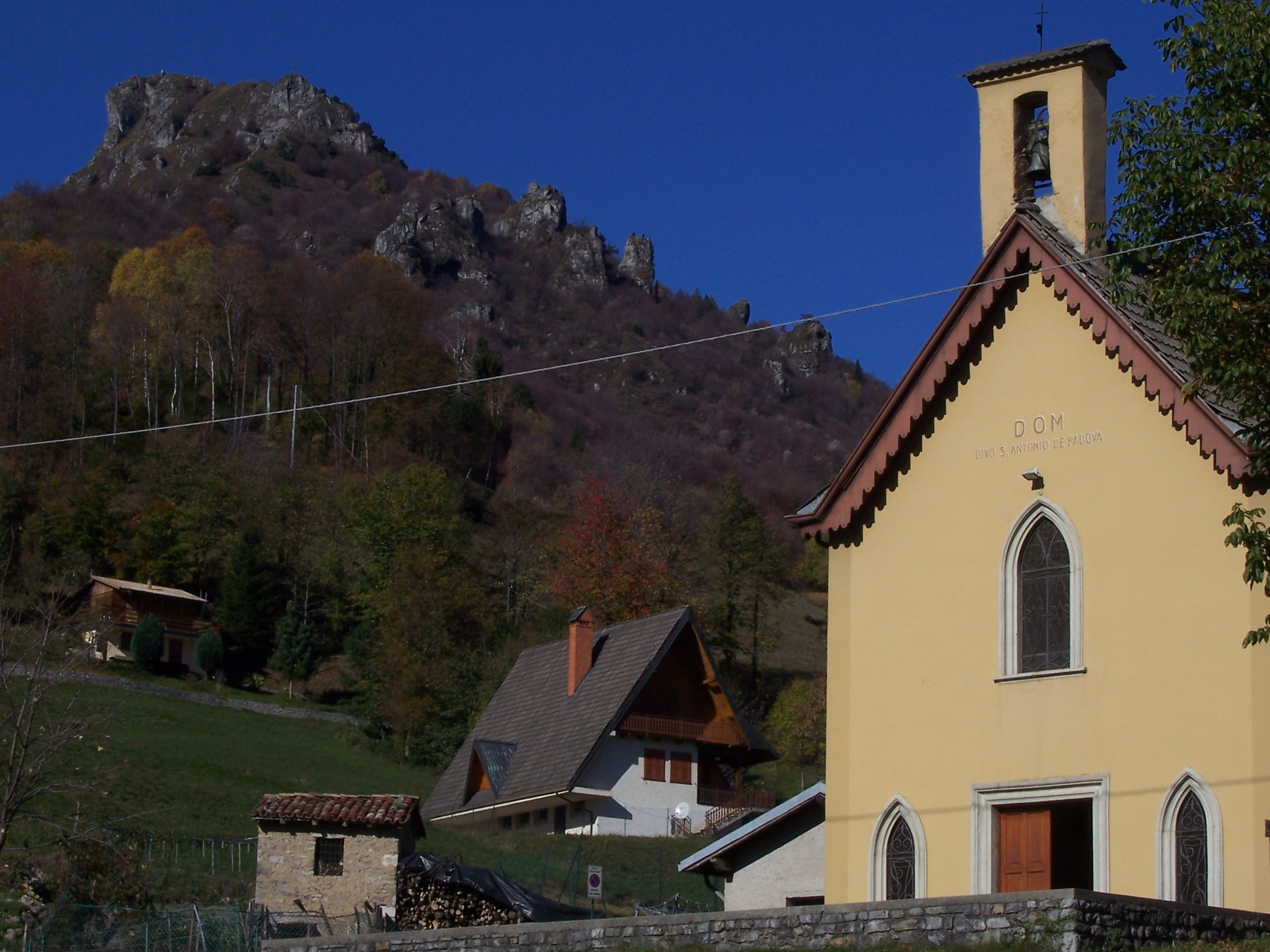

Highest point
- Elevation: 1,458 m (4,783 ft)

Geography
- Location: Lombardy, Italy
- Parent range: Bergamo Alps

Corno Zuccone (Italian pronunciation: [ˈkɔrno ddzukˈkoːne]) is a mountain of Lombardy, Italy. It is located within the Bergamo Alps. There is mountain hiking, but both the ascent and descent are technically challenging (difficulty level 2 out of 3).

Geologically, Corno Zuccone consists of dolomite slabs.
