= Wild cucumber =

Wild cucumber may refer to:

- Armenian cucumber, a melon which when pickled is sold as "pickled wild cucumber" in Middle Eastern markets
- Cucumis sativus var. hardwickii, the wild ancestors of modern domesticated cucumbers (Cucumis sativus)
- Echinocystis, a genus of gourds found throughout most of North America
- Marah, a genus of gourds native to western North America
- Tsupu, a Coast Miwok elder also known as Wild Cucumber
