= Zucco =

Zucco is a surname. Notable people with the surname include:

== People ==
- Francesco Zucco (1570–1627), Italian painter
- George Zucco (1886–1960), English character actor
- Ivan Zucco (born 1995), Italian professional boxer
- Luciano Lorenzini Zucco (born 1974), aka Zucco (politician), Brazilian politician, brother of Rodrigo Zucco
- Rodrigo Lorenzini Zucco (born 1970), aka Delegado Zucco, Brazilian politician
- Ross Zucco (1934–1960), American speed skater
- Vic Zucco (born 1935), American football defensive back

== Fictional characters ==
- Tony Zucco, in the DC Comics universe

== See also ==
- Zuco 103, a Dutch musical ensemble
- Zuko (name), people and fictional characters with the name Zuko
- Roberto Succo (1962–1988), Italian serial killer
