= Cucumber tree =

Cucumber tree (or cucumbertree) is a common name for several unrelated trees and may refer to:

- Averrhoa bilimbi, native to South-east Asia
- Dendrosicyos socotranus, native to the island of Socotra.
- Kigelia africana, native to tropical Africa
- Magnolia acuminata, native to the eastern United States and southern Canada
