= Zucco (politician) =

Brazilian politician (born 1974)

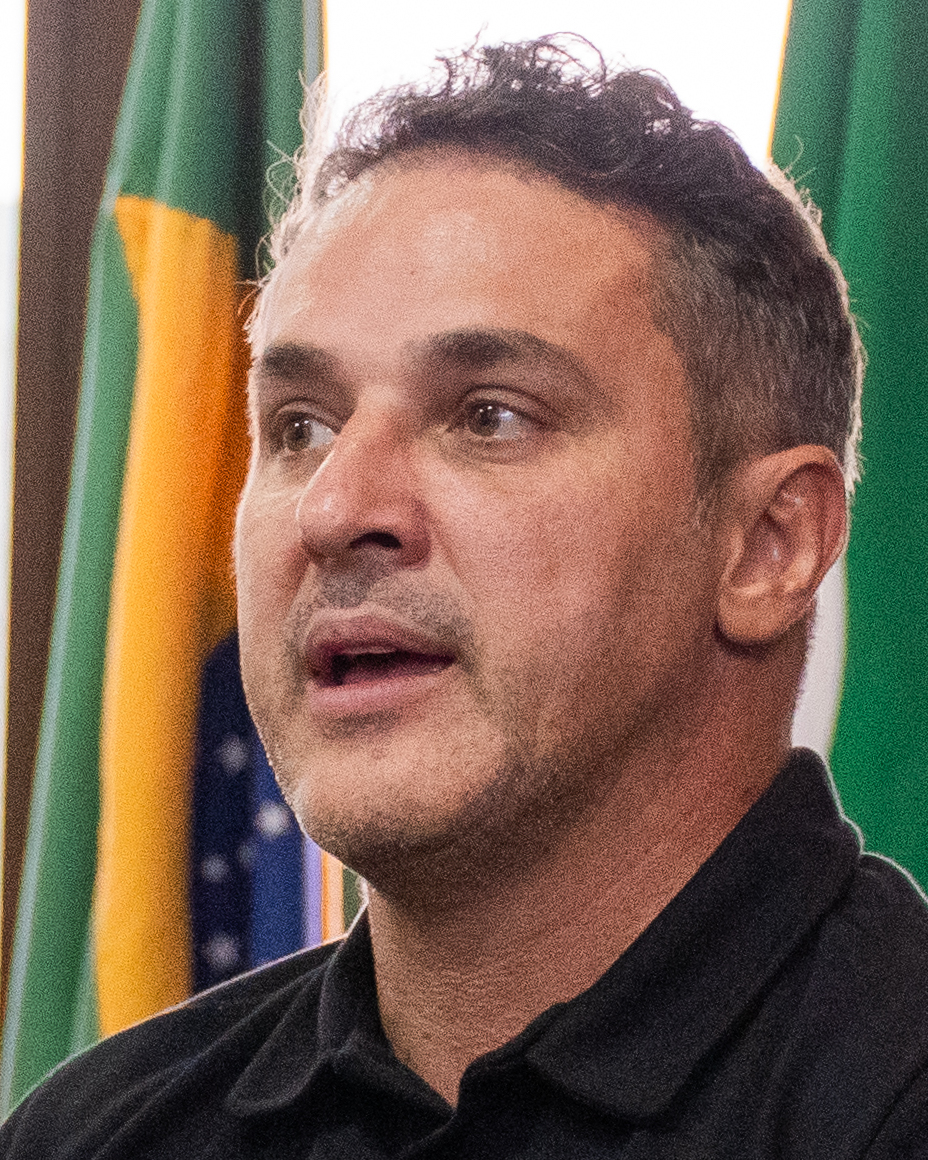
- Zucco in 2026

Governor-elect of Rio Grande do Sul
- Assuming office 6 January 2027
- Vice Governor: Silvana Covatti (elect)
- Succeeding: Eduardo Leite

Member of the Chamber of Deputies
- Incumbent
- Assumed office 1 February 2023
- Constituency: Rio Grande do Sul

Member of the Legislative Assembly of Rio Grande do Sul
- In office 31 January 2019 – 31 January 2023
- Constituency: At-large

Personal details
- Born: Luciano Lorenzini Zucco; 9 March 1974 (age 52) Alegrete, Rio Grande do Sul, Brazil
- Party: PL (2023–present)
- Other political affiliations: PSL (2018–2022); UNIÃO (2022); Republicanos (2022–2023)

Military service
- Allegiance: Brazil
- Branch/service: Brazilian Army
- Rank: Lieutenant colonel

Luciano Lorenzini Zucco, known mononymously as Zucco (born 9 March 1974) is a Brazilian politician serving as a member of the Chamber of Deputies since 2023. From 2019 to 2023, he was a member of the Legislative Assembly of Rio Grande do Sul.

== Political career ==
In the 2018 elections, he ran for the Rio Grande do Sul state legislature under the PSL banner, receiving 166.747 votes (2.88%), making him the most popular candidate. Before taking office, Zucco served in the Southern Military Command, based in Porto Alegre. After being elected, he retired from the military.

In 2022, he ran for the Rio Grande do Sul federal legislature, this time under the Republican banner. He was elected with 259.023 votes (4.20%), becoming the most popular candidate in the state.

In 2023, he switched parties to the Liberal Party (PL).

He runs for governor in the 2026 elections.

== Electoral Results ==
Year	Election	Party	Office	Coalition	Partners	Party	Votes	Percent	Result
2018	State Elections of Rio Grande do Sul	PSL	State Deputy	Rio Grande Above Everything (DEM, PSL)	—N/a		166,747	2.28%	Elected
2022	State Elections of Rio Grande do Sul	PL	Federal Deputy	—N/a			259,023	4.20%	Elected
2026	State Elections of Rio Grande do Sul	PL	Governor	Rio Grande Can Do More (PL, PP, UNIÃO, NOVO, PODE, Republicanos, DC)	Silvana Covatti	PP	3,516,048	58.05%	Elected

== Distinctions ==
- - Order of Military Merit (Brazil)
- - Medalha do Mérito Farroupilha (Rio Grande do Sul, 2026)

Political offices
Preceded by Eduardo Leite	Governor of Rio Grande do Sul; Taking office 2027	Elect
