= Squash blossom =

Edible flowers of Cucurbita species

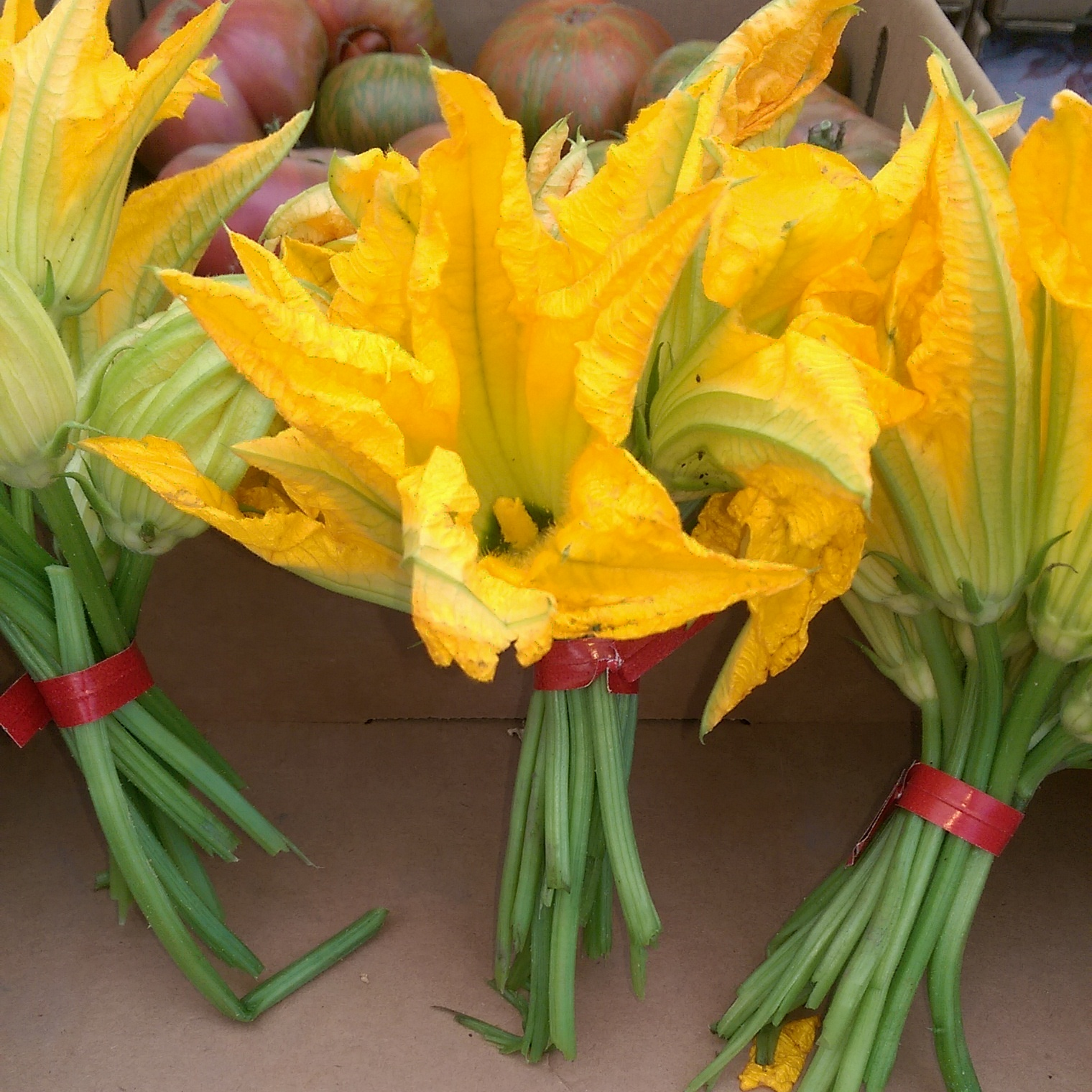
- Zucchini flowers
- Alternative names: Courgette flowers
- Type: Edible flowers

Squash blossoms (called courgette flowers in Great Britain) are the edible flowers of Cucurbita species, particularly Cucurbita pepo, the species that produces zucchini (courgette), marrow, spaghetti squash, and many other types of squash.

== Availability ==
Squash blossoms are highly perishable, and as such are rarely stocked in supermarkets. Male and female squash blossoms can be used interchangeably, but picking only male flowers (leaving some for pollination) allows the plant to also produce some fruit (squash).

== Culinary uses ==
Squash blossoms may be stuffed, battered and fried, or made into soup. The flowers have a subtle flavor, reminiscent of young zucchini, and can be eaten raw.

=== Stuffed blossoms ===
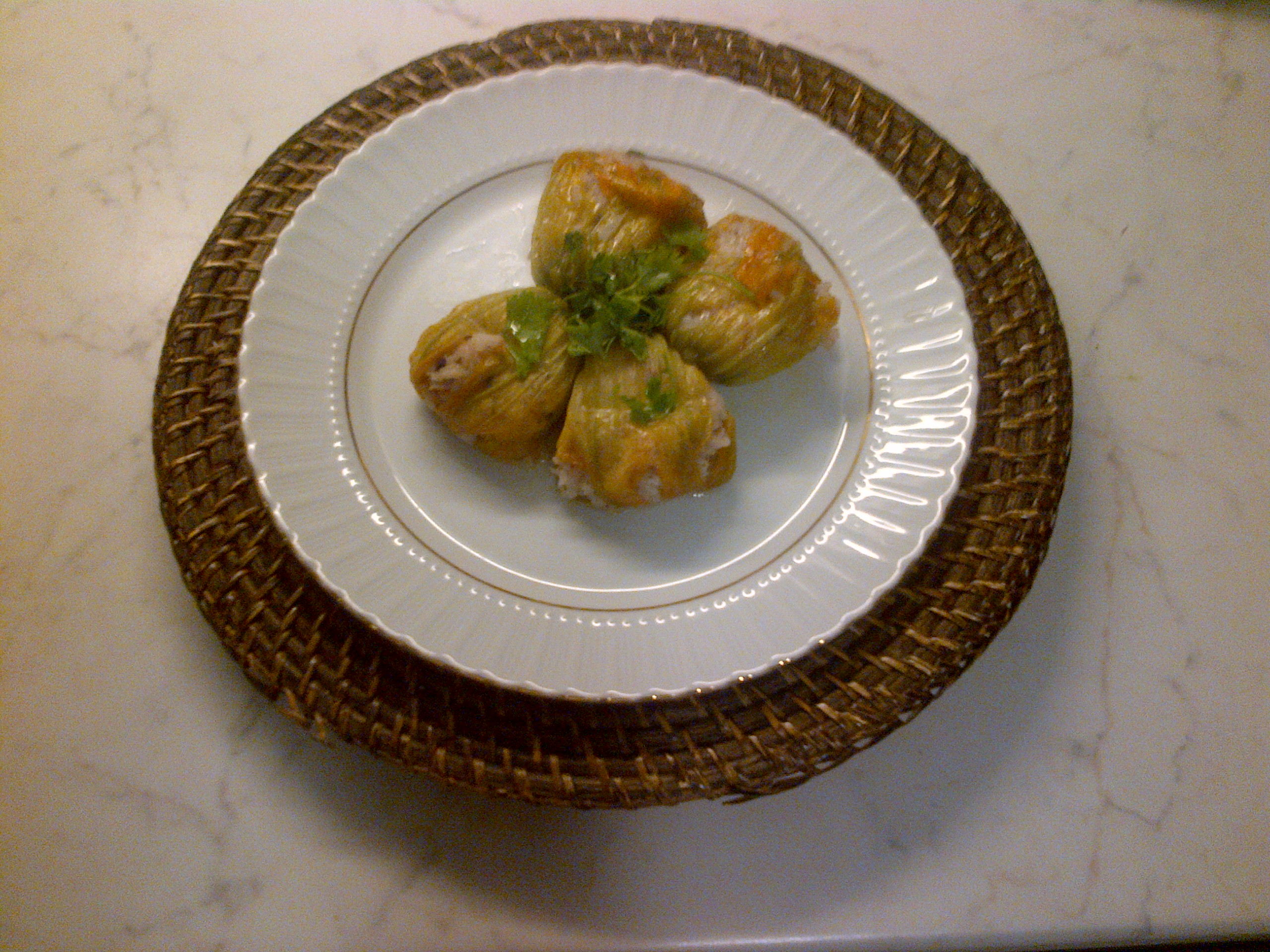
Stuffed squash blossoms

The squash blossoms are frequently stuffed and cooked in some Southeast European and Middle Eastern cuisines. The dish is called Kolokythoanthoi (Κολοκυθόανθοι) in Greek and Kabak çiçeği dolması in Turkish. The stuffing frequently includes a soft cheese, such as ricotta, which is reminiscent of the Ancient Greek dish thrion.

In Turkey and Greece, squash blossoms are also stuffed with rice, meat and spices. There are two variants of the dish; The variant that contains minced meat in its stuffing is usually served hot, while the meatless version (stuffed squash blossoms with olive oil, rice and spices) is served cold and consumed frequently as a meze with ouzo, or rakı. The dish is especially popular in the coastal regions of Greece and Turkey.

Both Turkish and Greek Cypriots cook stuffed blossoms in a similar fashion. Cypriot Greek name for the dish is kupepia me anthus ( αγόρασέ μου άνθος).

=== Other ===
In most regions of Italy and in some parts of Catalonia (Spain) they are frequently made into fritters.

In Mexican cuisine, especially in Central Mexico, squash blossom (known as flor de calabaza in Spanish) is widely used, particularly in soups and as a filling for quesadillas. Traditionally, they are often paired with epazote (Dysphania ambrosioides), an herb that enhances their flavor. The use of squash blossoms in Mexican dishes dates back to pre-Hispanic indigenous culture.

== Gallery ==
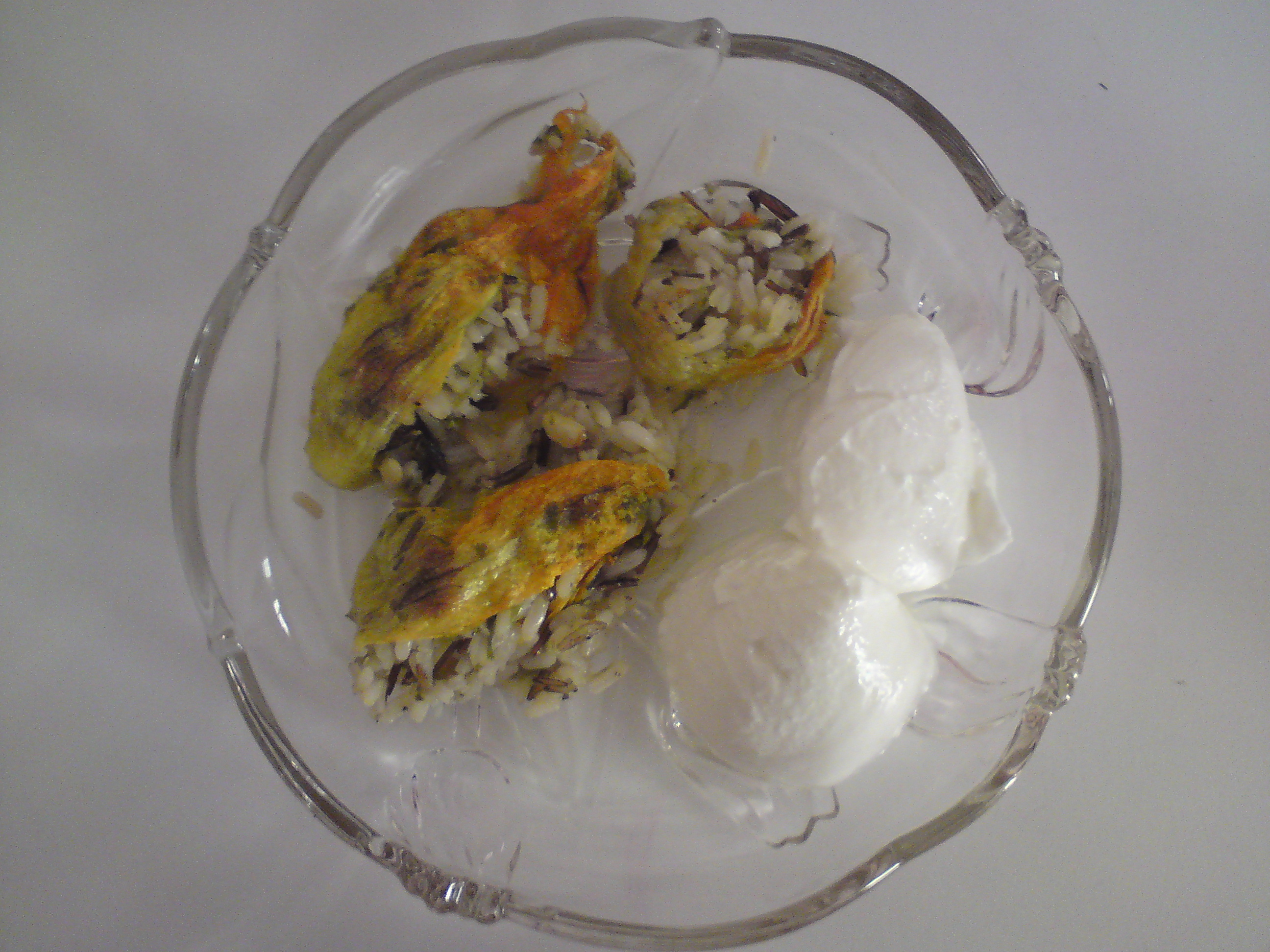
Kolokythoanthoi are often served with a dollop of yogurt on the side

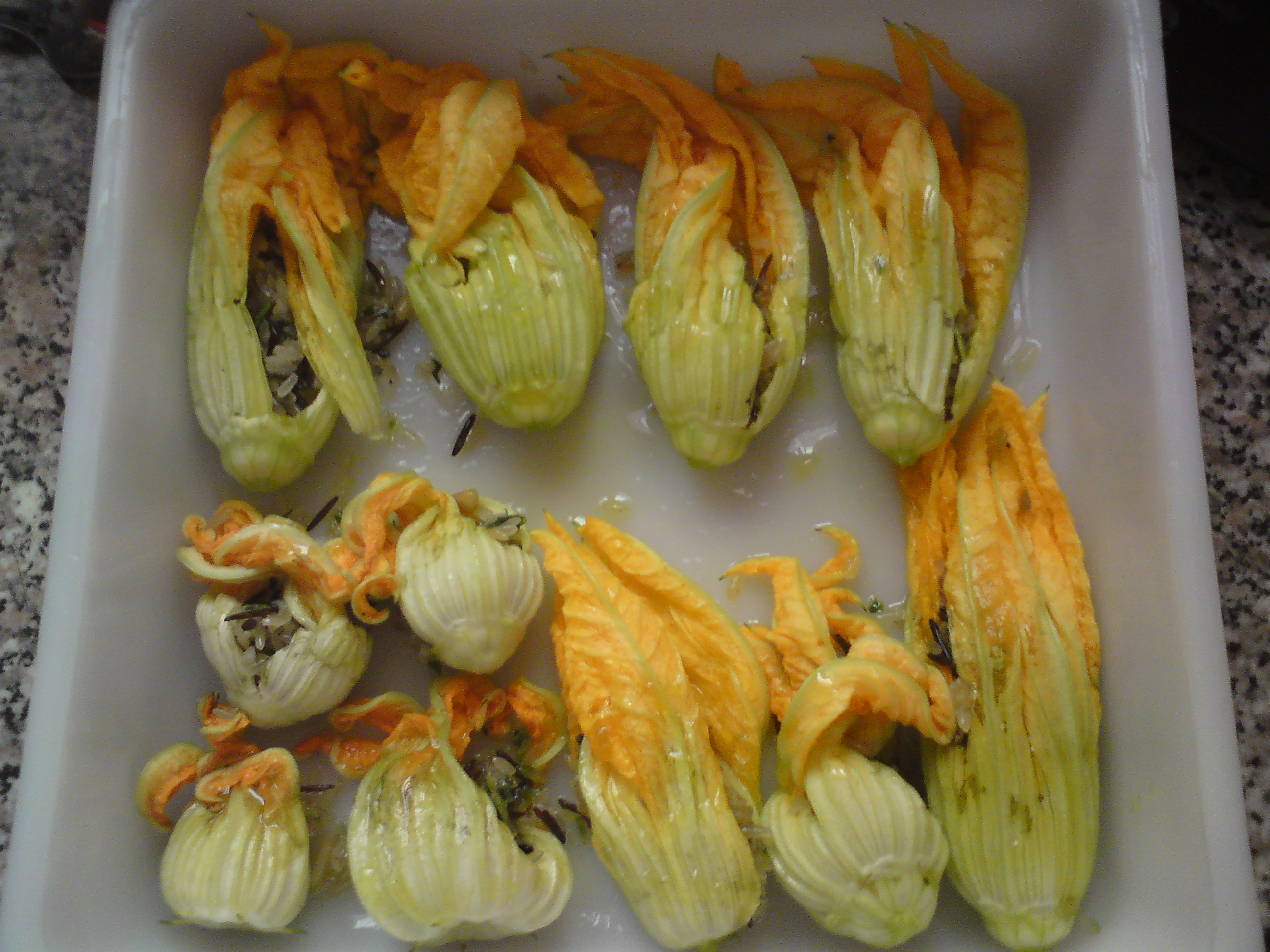
Kolokythoanthoi prepared for cooking

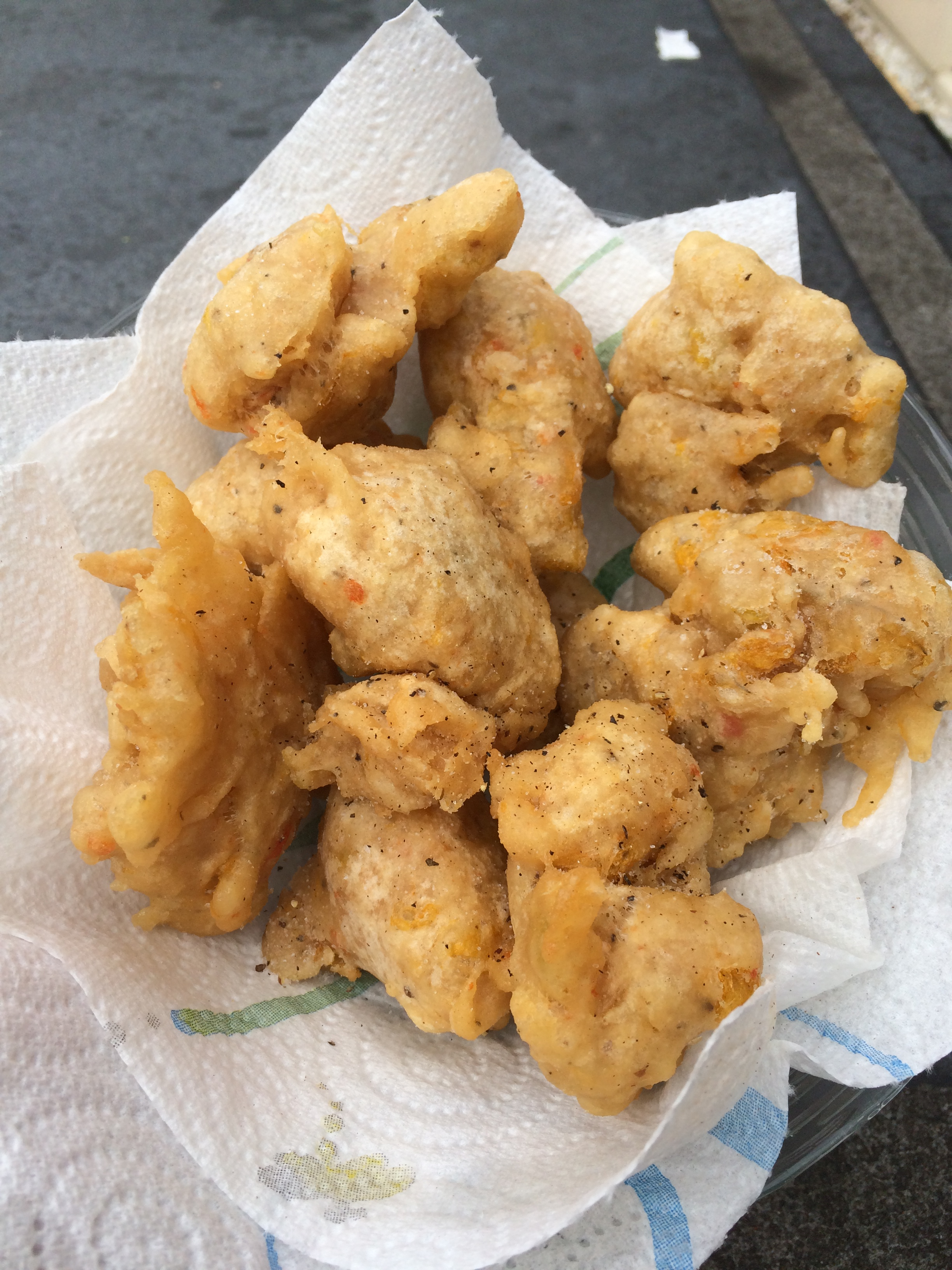
Frittelle di fiori di zucca (pumpkin flower fritters) also in Catalan flors de carbassera or badocs

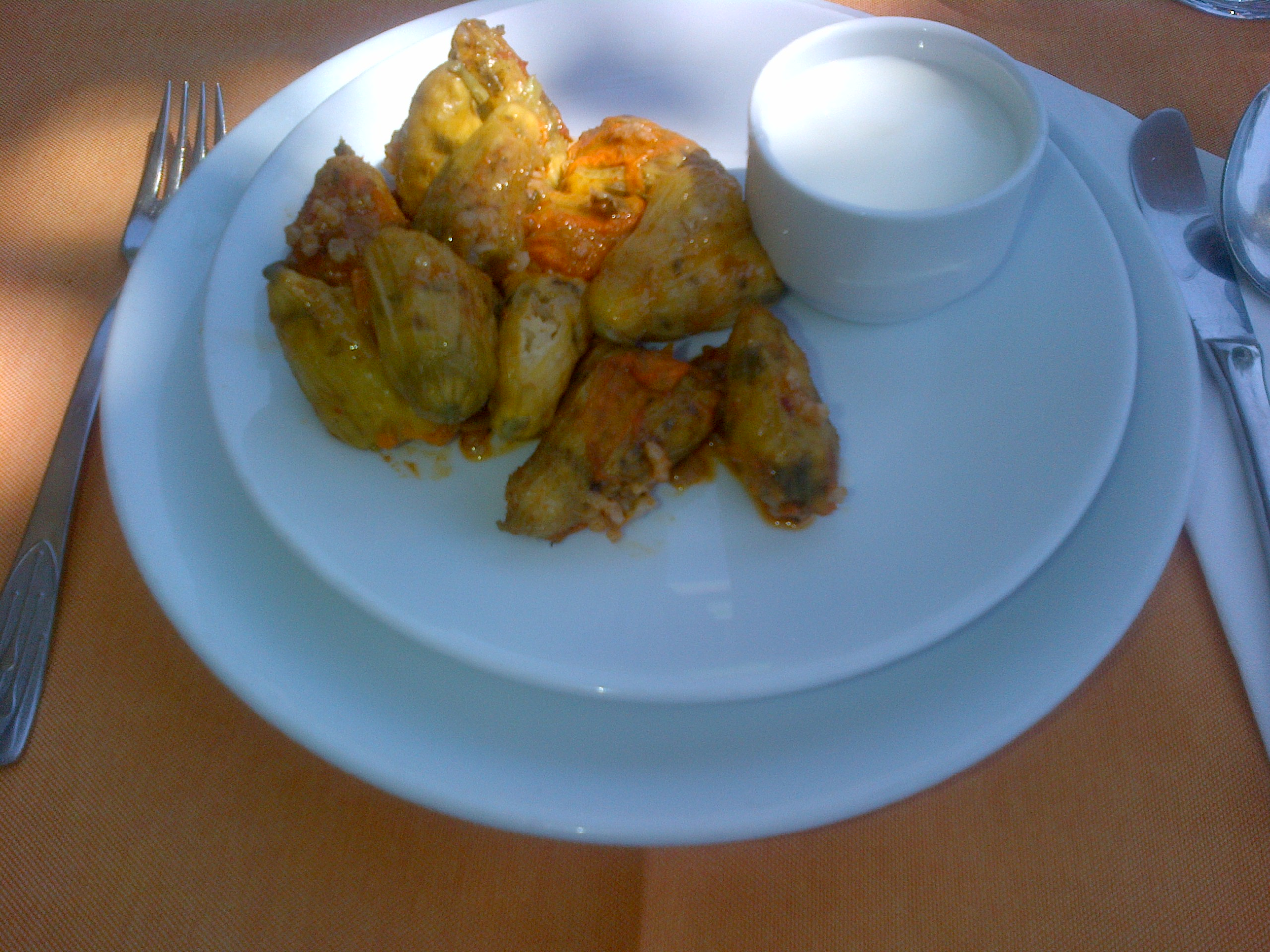
Kabak çiçeği dolması with meat

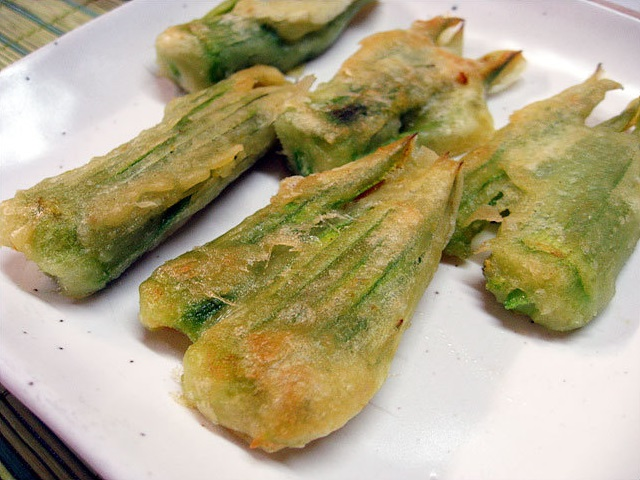
Hobak-kkot-jeon (pan-fried stuffed Cucurbita moschata flowers)

== See also ==
- List of stuffed dishes
