= Zucchini =

Edible summer squash

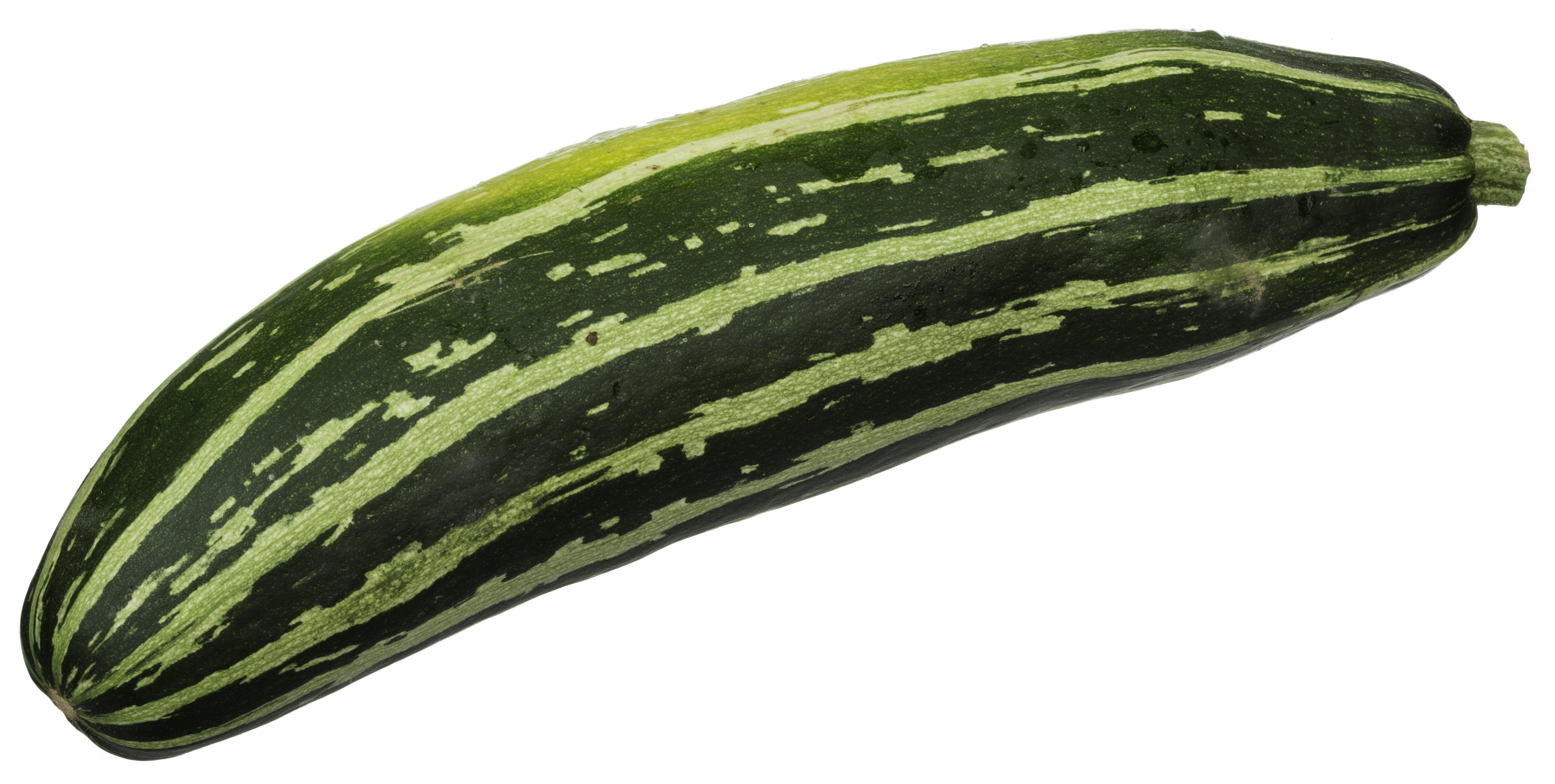
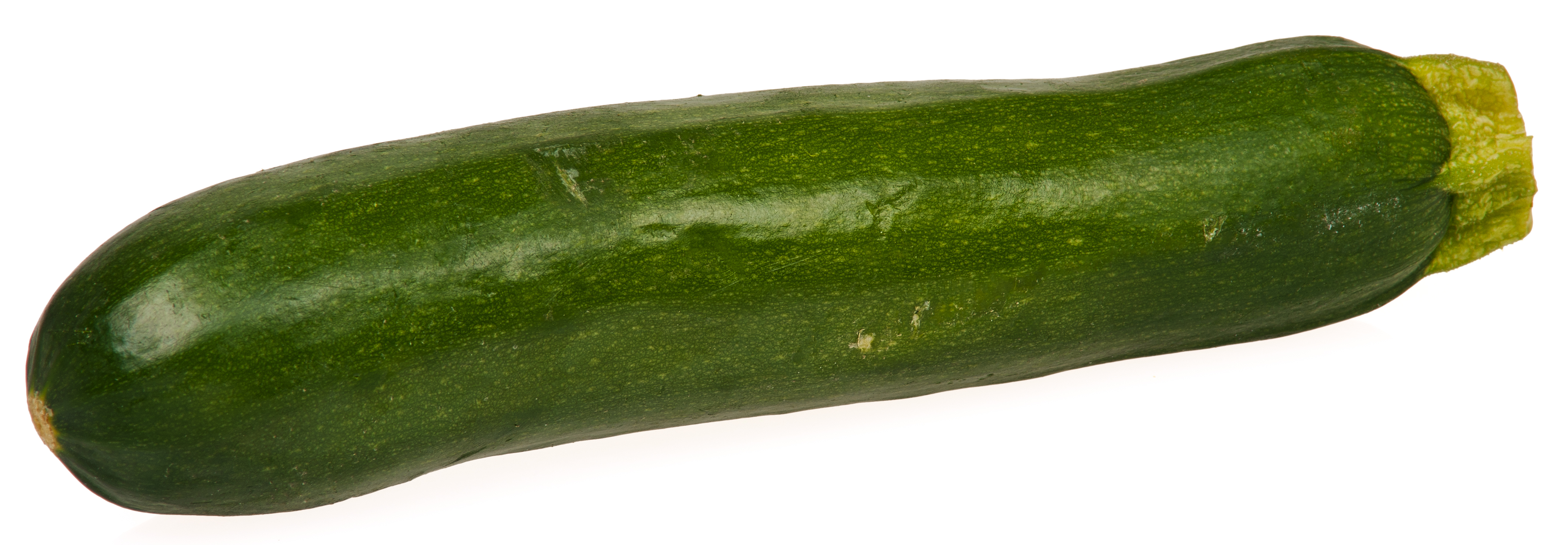
- Striped and uniform-colored zucchini
- Genus: Cucurbita
- Species: Cucurbita pepo
- Origin: 19th-century northern Italy

Zucchini (/zuːˈkiːni/ zoo-KEE-nee; pl. zucchini or zucchinis; in Australia and North America), courgette (/kʊərˈʒɛt/ koor-ZHET; in France and Britain), or Cucurbita pepo var. cylindrica is a summer squash, a vining herbaceous plant whose fruit are harvested when their immature seeds and epicarp (rind) are still soft and edible. It is closely related, but not identical, to the marrow; its fruit may be called marrow when mature.

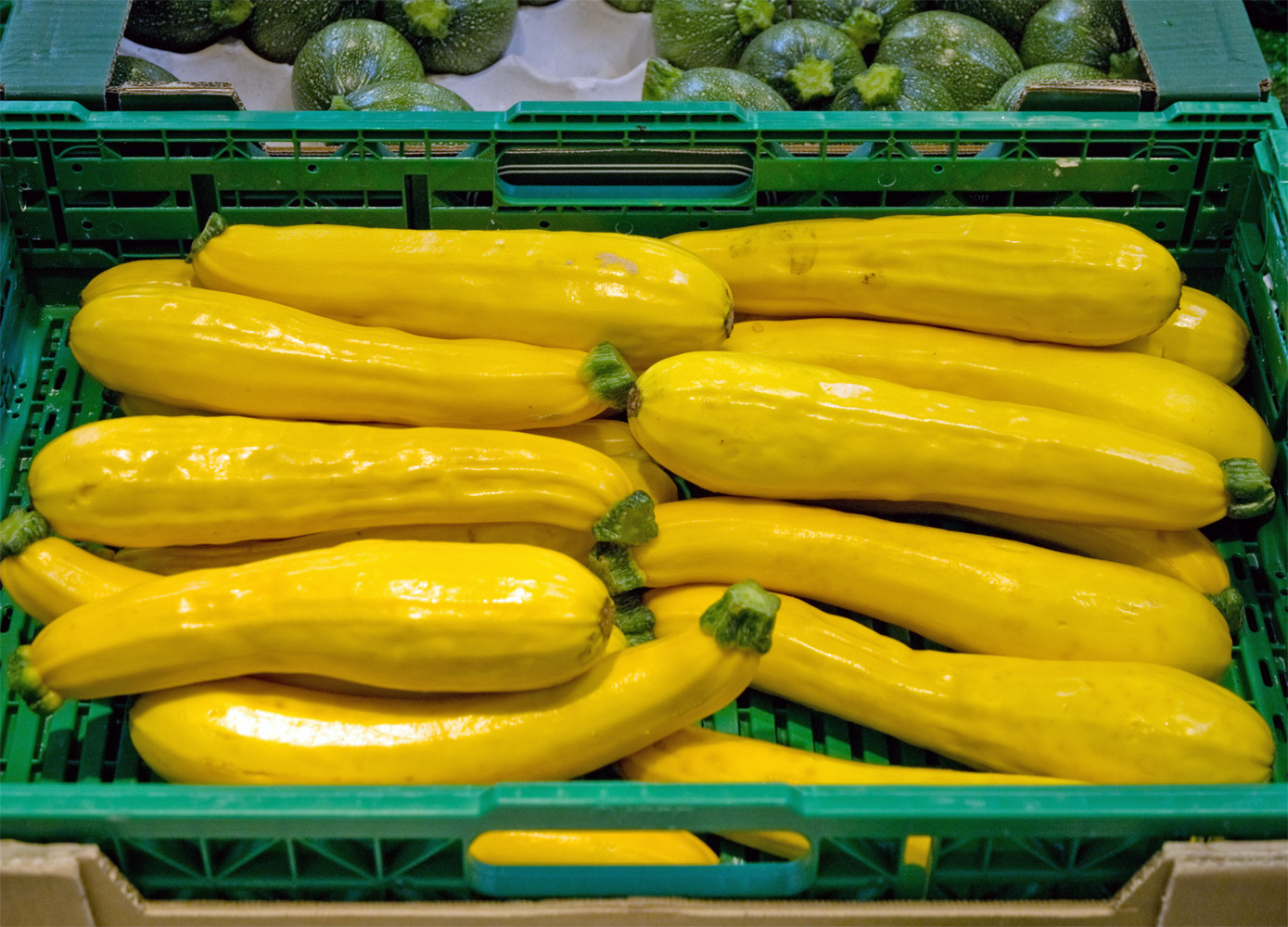
Golden zucchini grown in the Netherlands for sale in a supermarket in Montpellier, France, in April 2013

Ordinary zucchini fruit are any shade of green, though the golden zucchini is a deep yellow or orange. At maturity, they can grow to nearly 1 meter (3 feet) in length, but they are normally harvested at about 15–25 cm (6–10 in). In botany, the zucchini's fruit is a pepo, a berry (the swollen ovary of the zucchini flower) with a hardened epicarp. In cookery, it is treated as a vegetable, usually cooked and eaten as an accompaniment or savory dish, though occasionally used in sweeter cooking.

Zucchini descend from squashes first domesticated in Mexico and Central America over 7,000 years ago, but the zucchini itself was bred in Milan in the late 19th century. Zucchini occasionally contain toxic cucurbitacins, making them extremely bitter, and causing severe gastro-enteric upsets. Causes include stressed growing conditions, and cross pollination with ornamental squashes.

== Etymology and common names ==
The term zucchini is the plural of zucchino, a diminutive of zucca, meaning "gourd", "marrow", "pumpkin" or "squash" in Italian. The word exists in both feminine (zucchina, pl. zucchine) and masculine (zucchino, pl. zucchini) forms, the first being standard Italian and the second a Tuscan variant. The original Italian text of Pellegrino Artusi's 1891 cookbook La scienza in cucina e l'arte di mangiar bene (Science in the Kitchen and the Art of Eating Well) uses the feminine form, but The Oxford Companion to Italian Food observes that "North Americans prefer the version zucchini".

The first mention of the vegetable in English publications was in the early twentieth century, in English cookbooks and travel books in one of which it was referred to as "an odd kind of little squash, very tender and palatable".

In France, Britain and some other places, zucchini are called courgettes. According to the Dictionnaire de l'Académie française, the word is a twentieth-century coinage, deriving from the fourteenth-century courge, a plant of the cucurbitaceae family such as a pumpkin or marrow.

Another common name for zucchini, baby marrow, is used interchangeably in South Africa with courgette.

== History ==
Zucchini has its ancestry in the Americas, specifically Mesoamerica. The varieties of green, cylindrical squash harvested immature and typically called "zucchini" were cultivated in northern Italy, as much as three centuries after the introduction of cucurbits from the Americas. It appears that this occurred in the second half of the 19th century, although the first description of the variety under the name zucchini occurs in a work published in Milan in 1901.

The first records of zucchini in the United States date to the early 1920s. It was almost certainly taken to America by Italian immigrants and probably was first cultivated in the United States in California. A 1928 report on vegetables grown in New York State treats 'Zucchini' as one among 60 cultivated varieties of C. pepo.

== Culinary uses ==
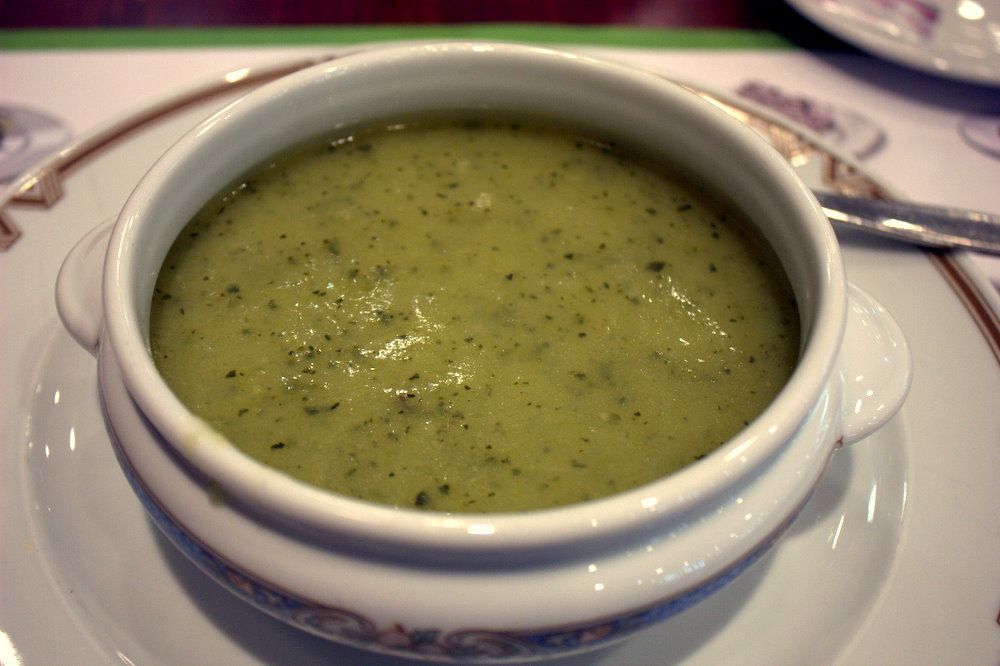
Zucchini soup

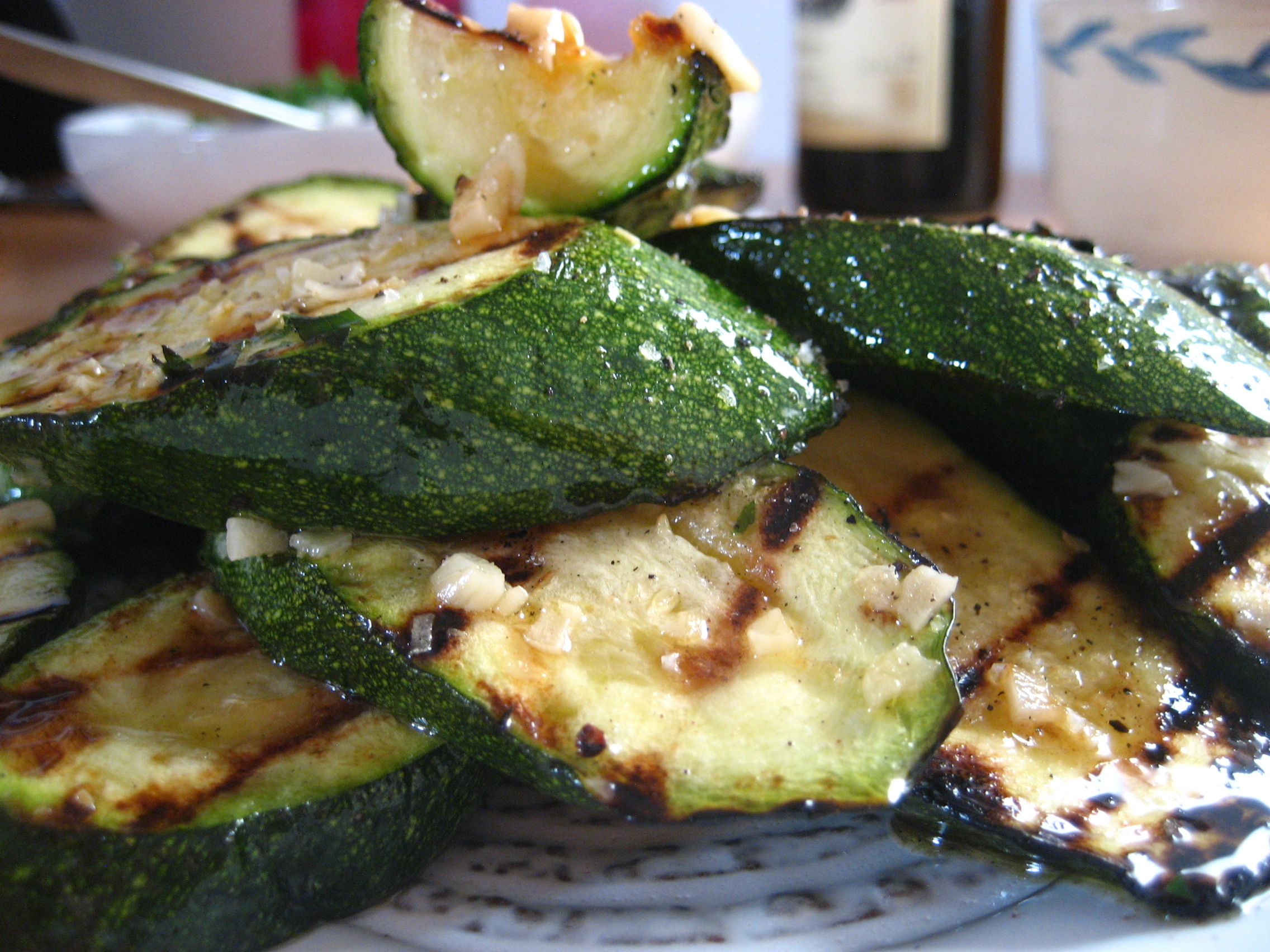
Grilled zucchini

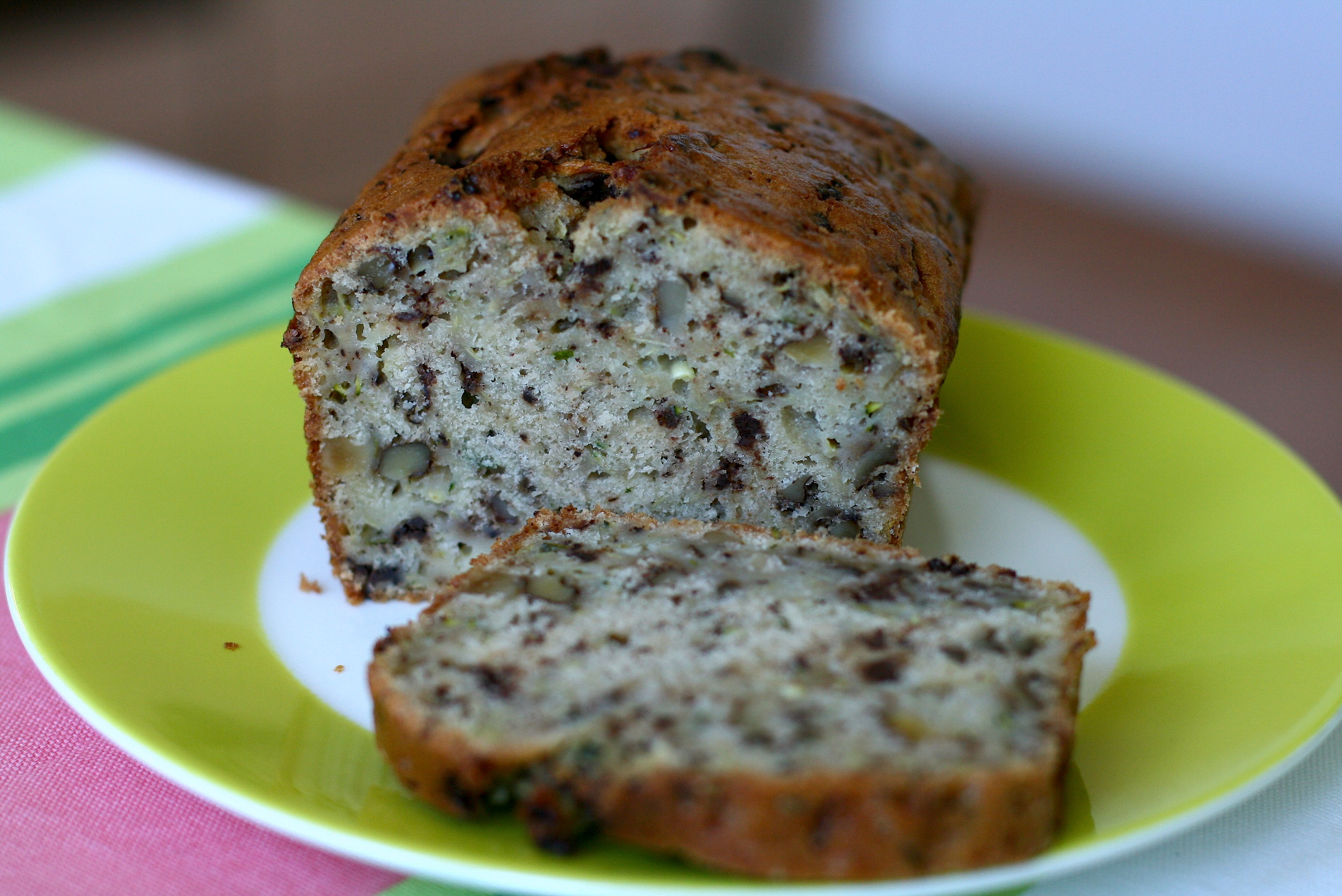
Zucchini bread

When used for food, zucchini are usually picked when under 20 cm (8 in) in length, when the seeds are still soft and immature. Mature zucchini can be 1 m (40 in) long or more. These larger ones often have mature seeds and hard skins, requiring peeling and seeding. Zucchini with the flowers attached are a sign of a truly fresh and immature fruit, and are especially sought after for their sweeter flavor.

Zucchini are usually served cooked. They can be prepared using a variety of cooking techniques, including steamed, boiled, grilled, stuffed and baked, barbecued, fried, or incorporated in other recipes such as soufflés. Raw grated zucchini can also be combined with flour and spices in a zucchini bread.

Zucchini have a delicate flavor and can be found simply cooked with butter or olive oil and herbs, or in more complex dishes. The skin is usually left in place. When frying zucchini, it is recommended to pat down cut sections to make them drier, similarly to what may be done with eggplant, in order to keep the slices' shape while cooking. Zucchini can also be eaten raw, sliced or shredded, in a cold salad, as well as lightly cooked in hot salads, as in Thai or Vietnamese recipes. Mature (larger-sized) zucchini are well-suited for cooking in breads.

Zucchini can be cut with a spiralizer into noodle-like spirals and used as a low-carbohydrate substitute for pasta or noodles, often referred to as 'zoodles'.

Zucchini can be shredded with a grater into and combined with shredded carrots, parmesan cheese, garlic, egg and flour. The resulting mixture can be then be formed into patties which can be cooked in vegetable oil on a stovetop.

=== Europe ===
==== France ====
Zucchini are much used in the cuisine of France, where they are known as courgettes. Among the recipes in two standard culinary works of reference – Louis Saulnier's Le répertoire de la cuisine and Walter Bickel's Hering's Dictionary of Classical and Modern Cookery – are:

- Courgettes au fromage – With cheese: filled with grated cheese mixed with beaten egg, dipped in frying batter, deep fried.
- Courgettes à la crème – Creamed: simmered in butter, bound with light cream sauce.
- Courgettes à l'anglaise – English Style: peeled, cut in small pieces, steamed and served with melted butter or Hollandaise
- Courgettes frites – Fried: peeled, cut in slices, seasoned, coated with flour and fried in oil.
- Courgette beignets – Fritters: cut in slices, salted dipped in batter and deep-fried.
- Courgettes glacées – Glazed: peeled, cut lengthwise in quarters, cooked with butter, salt and pinch of sugar and a few drops of water to glaze.
- Courgettes à la grecque – Greek Style: cooked in a marinade of white wine. vinegar, garlic, onions. fennel, peppercorns and dried orange peel; served cold.
- Courgettes à la ménagère – Housekeeper style: hollowed out, filled with the chopped flesh mixed with hashed lamb, fried chopped onions, boiled rice and green peas, browned in a slow oven.
- Courgettes farcies – Stuffed: stuffed with duxelles and gratinéed.
- Courgettes à l'indienne – Indian style: sprinkled lightly with curry powder and served with a light Béchamel.
- Courgettes à la mentonnaise – Menton style: stuffed with the chopped flesh mixed with chopped cooked spinach, grated Parmesan, parsley and garlic and gratinéed in the oven.
- Courgettes à la niçoise – Nice style: lightly cooked in oil, flesh chopped, mixed with risotto, grated Parmesan, garlic tomato. concassees. Gratinéed in slow oven.
- Courgettes à la provençale – Provençal style: sautéed in hot oil and served with diced tomatoes, onions, parsley and garlic, with grated Parmesan and gratinéed in a slow oven.
- Courgettes à la sicilienne – Sicilian style: sliced unpeeled filled with sour cream, egg yolks, grated Parmesan and chopped chives seasoned with Cayenne pepper, dipped in egg and breadcrumbs and deep fried.
- Courgettes à l'espagnole – Spanish style: peeled, cut in slices, sautéed in oil and butter, arranged in a baking dish with diced tomatoes and sliced fried onions, seasoned with paprika, sprinkled with breadcrumbs, dotted with butter, and gratinated in the oven.
- Courgettes à la turque – Turkish style: with the chopped flesh mixed with hashed mutton, boiled rice and eggs, flavored with garlic and marjoram; braised in oven in light tomato sauce.

Courgettes (zucchini) are a key ingredient in ratatouille, a stew of summer vegetables prepared in olive oil and cooked for an extended time over low heat. The dish, originating near present-day Nice, is served as a side dish or on its own at lunch with bread.

==== Italy ====
Italian dishes using zucchini include:

- Spaghetti con salsa di zucchine (spaghetti with zucchini)
- Sformato di vitello e zucchine (veal and zucchini pie)
- Zucchine fritte (as for courgette beignets, above)
- Zucchine in agrodolce (in sweet-sour sauce)
- Zucchine stufate (stew)
- Zucchine ripiene (with numerous possible stuffings – such as minced cold meat, rice, cheese, breadcrumbs, and parsley).

==== Britain ====
In Britain, zucchini (called "courgettes" there) were known in the 1930s but were rare until after the Second World War. In the 1989 revised edition of her Italian Food, Elizabeth David wrote, "I think it worth recording here that, when I was writing this book in 1954 ... zucchini or courgettes were rare and expensive luxuries, imported from France". By 1957 a leading nursery in Surrey initiated the cultivation of the vegetable for the British market and, in David's words, "before long they were to be found in many enterprising greengrocers’ shops [with] the general acceptance today of this attractive and versatile vegetable". In 2005, a poll of 2,000 people revealed the courgette to be Britain's 10th most popular culinary vegetable.

=== Middle East and Africa ===
In Egypt, zucchini may be cooked with tomato sauce, garlic, and onions. In Sephardic Jewish cuisine, medias (from Judeo-Spanish, meaning "halves") is a dish of halved zucchini stuffed with meat and a mixture of ingredients, and cooked in a sour lemon sauce.

Stuffed zucchini are found in many cuisines. As an example, in Lebanon, zucchini can be used to create Kousa Mahshi, which translates to "stuffed zucchini" in Arabic. The dish is made by coring the squash and then stuffing it with rice and spiced ground beef. Vegetables and other protein substitutes such as lamb may also be used. The contents of the zucchini are cooked by first boiling it and then reducing the heat of the zucchini's pot or container before letting it simmer for an hour. There's also Lebanese Zucchini Stew, or Mnazelah, a stew consisting of zucchini, potatoes, tomatoes, meat, and varied spices. Typical stuffings in the Middle Eastern family of dolma include rice, onions, tomato, and sometimes meat.

=== Australia and the Americas ===
In Australia, a popular dish is a frittata-like dish called zucchini slice.

In Mexico, the flower (known as flor de calabaza) is often cooked in soups or used as a filling for quesadillas. The fruit is used in stews, soups (i.e. caldo de res, de pollo, or de pescado, mole de olla, etc.) and other preparations. The flower, as well as the fruit, is eaten often throughout Latin America.

== Nutrition ==
Raw green ("baby") zucchini
Nutritional value per 100 g (3.5 oz)
- Energy: 21 kcal (88 kJ)
- Carbohydrates: 3.1 g
- Dietary fiber: 1.1 g
- Fat: 0.4 g
- Protein: 2.71 g
Vitamins and minerals
Vitamins	Quantity %DV^{†}
Vitamin A equiv.	54% 490 μg
Thiamine (B1)	4% 0.042 mg
Riboflavin (B2)	3% 0.036 mg
Niacin (B3)	4% 0.705 mg
Pantothenic acid (B5)	7% 0.367 mg
Vitamin B6	8% 0.142 mg
Folate (B9)	5% 20 μg
Vitamin C	38% 34 mg
Minerals	Quantity %DV^{†}
Calcium	2% 21 mg
Iron	4% 0.79 mg
Magnesium	8% 33 mg
Manganese	9% 0.196 mg
Phosphorus	7% 93 mg
Potassium	15% 459 mg
Sodium	0% 3 mg
Zinc	8% 0.83 mg
- Other constituents: Quantity
- Water: 93 g
- Link to USDA database entry
- ^{†}Percentages estimated using US recommendations for adults, except for potassium, which is estimated based on expert recommendation from the National Academies.

A raw zucchini is 93% water, 3% carbohydrates, 3% protein, and contains negligible fat (table). In a reference amount of 100 g (3.5 oz), raw zucchini supplies 21 calories of food energy, and is a rich source (20% or more of the Daily Value, DV) of vitamin A (54% DV) and vitamin C (38% DV) (table). It is a moderate source of potassium (15% DV), with no other micronutrients in significant content (table).

== Toxicology ==
Members of the plant family Cucurbitaceae, which includes zucchini / marrows, pumpkins and cucumbers, can contain toxins called cucurbitacins. These are steroids which defend the plants from predators, and have a bitter taste to humans. Cultivated cucurbitaceae are bred for low levels of the toxin and are safe to eat. However, ornamental pumpkins can have high levels of cucurbitacins, and such ornamental plants can cross-fertilize edible cucurbitaceae—any such cross-fertilized seeds used by the gardener for growing food in the following season can therefore potentially produce bitter and toxic fruit. Dry weather or irregular watering can also favor the production of the toxin, which is not destroyed by cooking. Humans with an impaired sense of taste (particularly the elderly) should therefore ask another person to taste the zucchini for them. This toxin has caused at least one death of an elderly person, in 2015. Investigators warned that gardeners should not save their own seeds, as reversion to forms containing more poisonous cucurbitacin might occur.

Zucchini can also be responsible for allergy caused by the presence of a protein: profilin.

== Cultivation ==
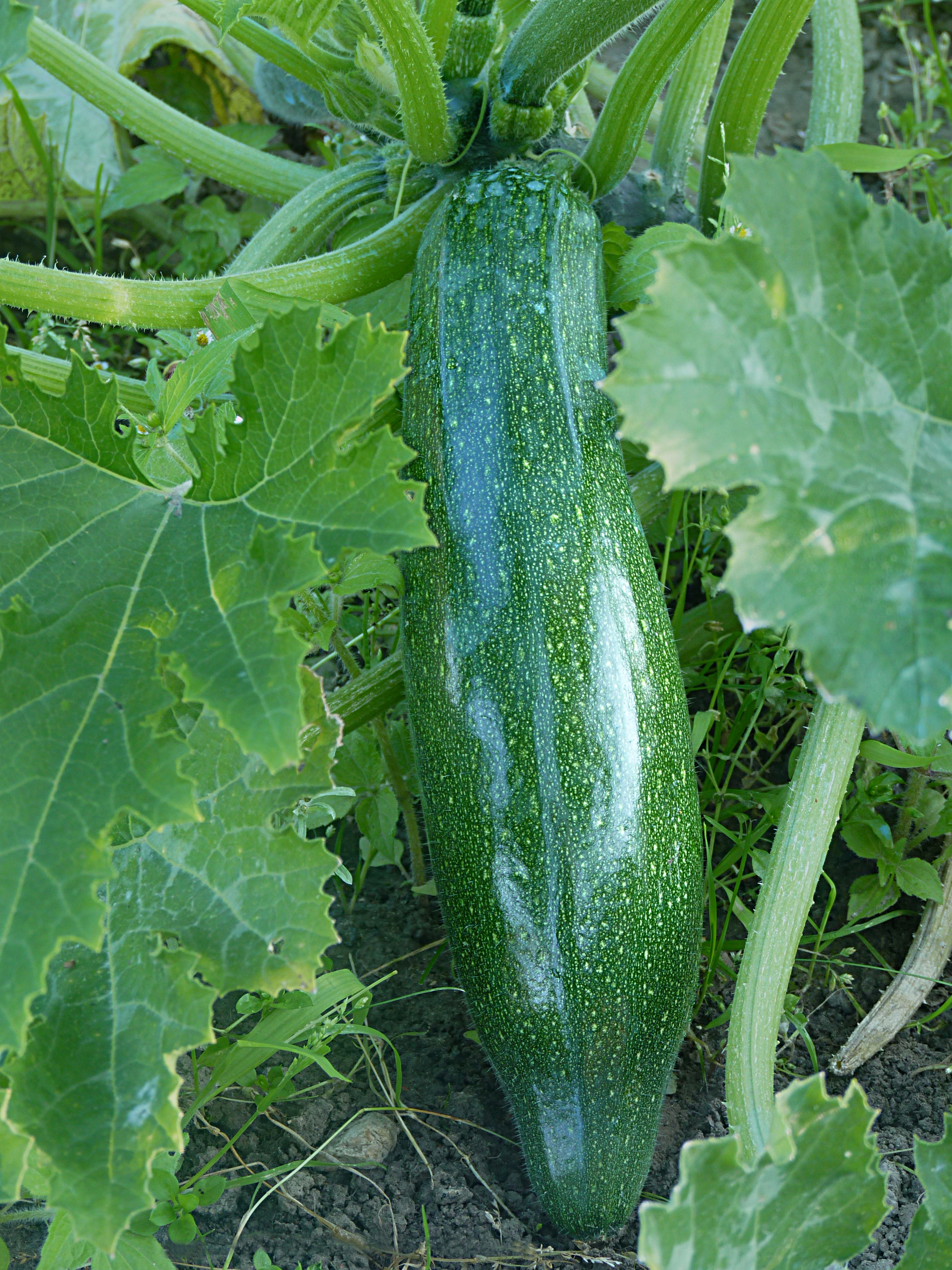
Harvest-ready, although not yet full-grown, zucchini on plant

Although easy to grow, zucchini, like all squash, require plentiful bees for pollination. In areas of pollinator decline or high pesticide use, such as mosquito-spray districts, gardeners often experience fruit abortion, where the fruit begins to grow, then dries or rots. This is due to an insufficient number of pollen grains delivered to the female flower. It can be corrected by hand pollination or by increasing the bee population. In areas where C. pepo is native, the primary pollinators are squash bees.

Closely related to zucchini are Lebanese summer squash or kusa (not to be confused with cushaw), but they often are lighter green or even white. Some seed catalogs do not distinguish them. Various varieties of round zucchini are grown in different countries under different names, such as "Tondo di Piacenza" in Italy, "Qarabaghli" in Malta and "Ronde de Nice" in France. In the late 1990s, American producers in California cultivated and began marketing round yellow and green zucchini known as "8-ball" squash (the yellow ones are sometimes known as "1-ball" or "gold ball").

=== Cultivars ===
- Bianco di Trieste
- Black Beauty, very dark green
- Cocozelle, dark green with white stripes, heirloom

== Musicology ==
Vegetable orchestras, such as the London Vegetable Orchestra use zucchini trumpets, butternut squash trombones, pumpkin drums and aubergine castanets. Other vegetables played include carrots, bell peppers, potatoes and parsnips.

== See also ==
- Aehobak (Korean zucchini)
