= Garnish (cooking) =

Decoration added to food or drink

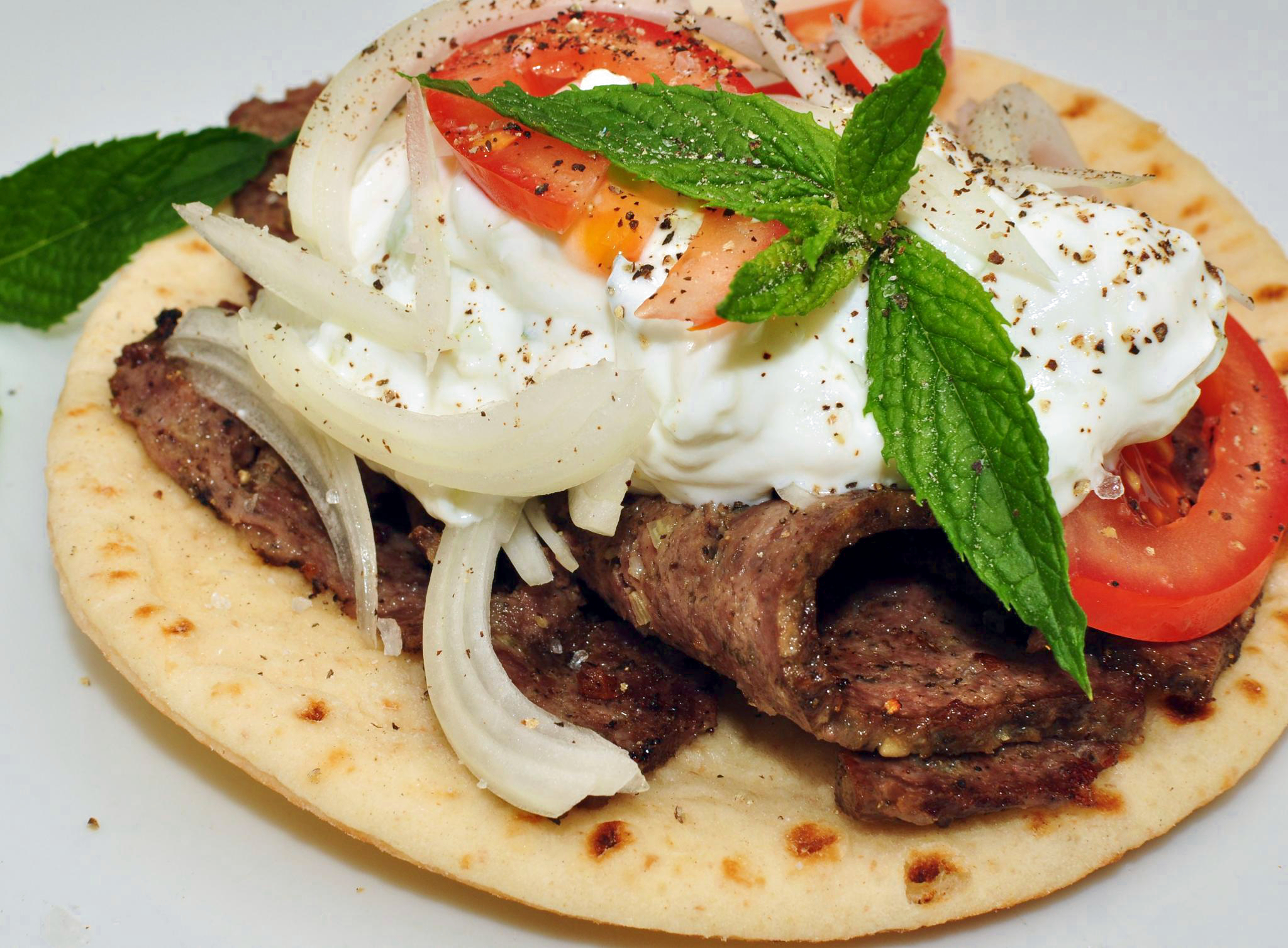
A gyro sandwich garnished with mint leaves

A garnish is an edible item or substance used as a decoration or embellishment for a prepared food dish or drink. Some garnishes are mainly for appearance, while others impart additional or contrasting flavors or textures, and may also serve cultural or symbolic functions. The notion of a garnish is distinct from that of a condiment, a prepared sauce added to another food item primarily for its flavor, but which does not serve a decorative function. A food item which is served with garnish may be described as being garni, French for "garnished."

== Overview ==
The English word garnish derives from the French garnir, meaning "to furnish". Within French cuisine, a garnish can be quite substantial, often referring to side dishes, such as cooked vegetables or a ragout intended to complement the main dish. French garnishes might derive their names from historical figures, famous chefs, or the region from which they originate. For example, garnish Rossini, consisting of pan-fried foie gras topped with sliced black truffle, is named after the Romantic composer Gioacchino Rossini. He is rumoured to have ordered it as a topping for filet mignon, and once described the truffle as "the Mozart of mushrooms".

Typically, a garnish is used to make food or drink items more visually appealing. It may, for example, enhance its color, such as when paprika is sprinkled on a salmon salad. It may provide a color contrast, for example when chives are sprinkled on potatoes.

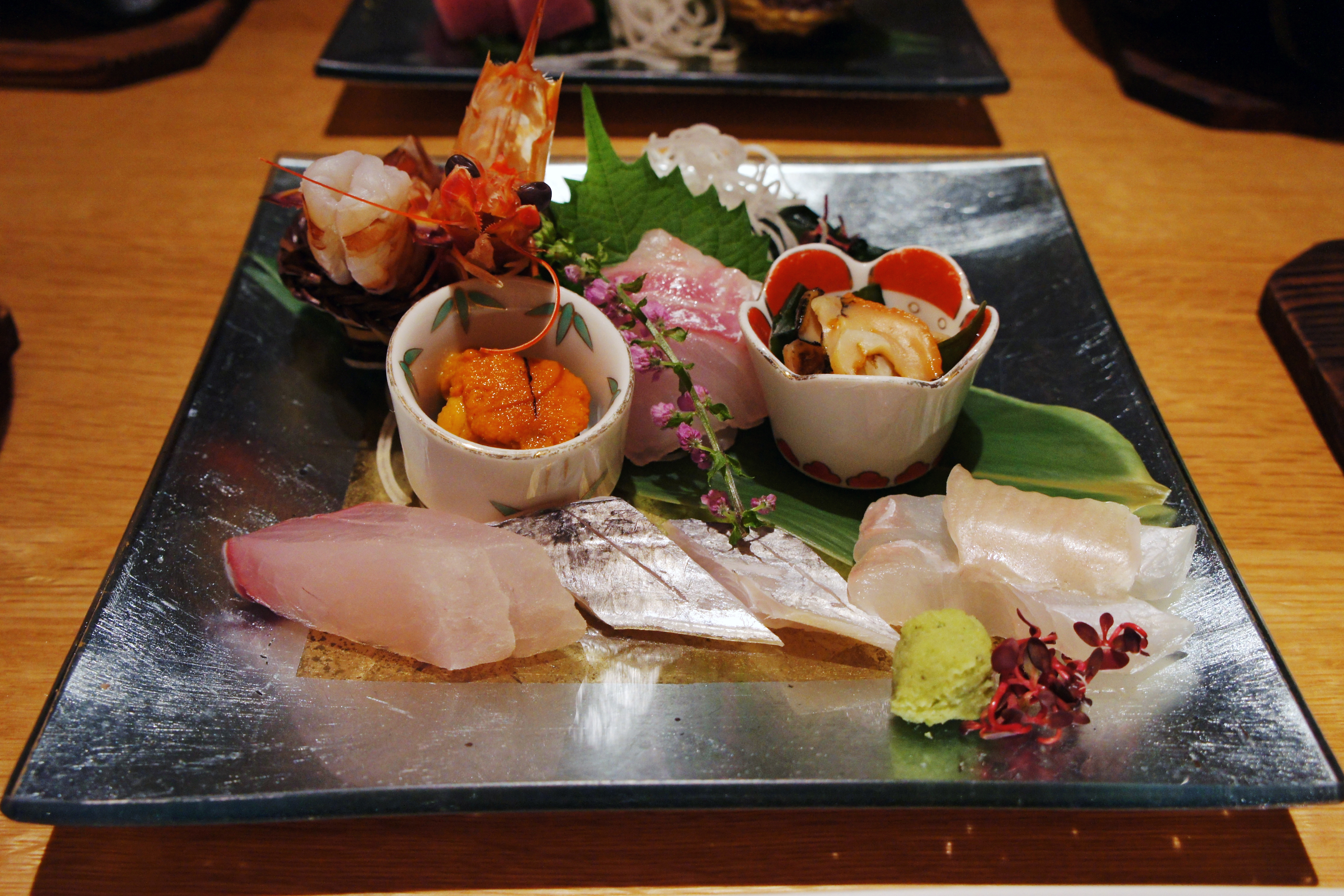
A dish of sashimi, garnished with both edible shiso leaves, grated daikon, and flowers, and inedible bamboo leaves. Garnishes associated with sashimi are referred to as tsuma.

A garnish may be so identified with a dish that the dish appears incomplete without it. Examples include a banana split sundae with cherries on top or buffalo wings served with celery stick garnish and blue cheese dressing.

While many Western sources, including the Oxford English Dictionary, specify a garnish as a food item, the word may also be used to describe inedible decorations in some contexts. Within Japanese Cuisine, for example, inedible leaf garnishes play an important artistic and symbolic role in the presentation of foods.

The precise use of garnishes is a plating technique associated with fine dining, where increased significance is placed on the presentation of foods. While the skilful and creative use of garnish is regarded as an important aspect of professional technique for contemporary chefs, some commentators see this emphasis as over-complicating dishes. In 2012 British food critic Jay Rayner declared a 'war on garnish', making a distinction between seasonings added to enhance the flavour of a dish, and what he terms "tweezer food". In the introduction to Elizabeth David's 1960 book French Provincial Cooking she writes that "There is the art, or the discipline, call it what you like, of leaving well alone".

== List of garnishes ==
=== Foods and entree ===
Garnishes for foods and entrees include:

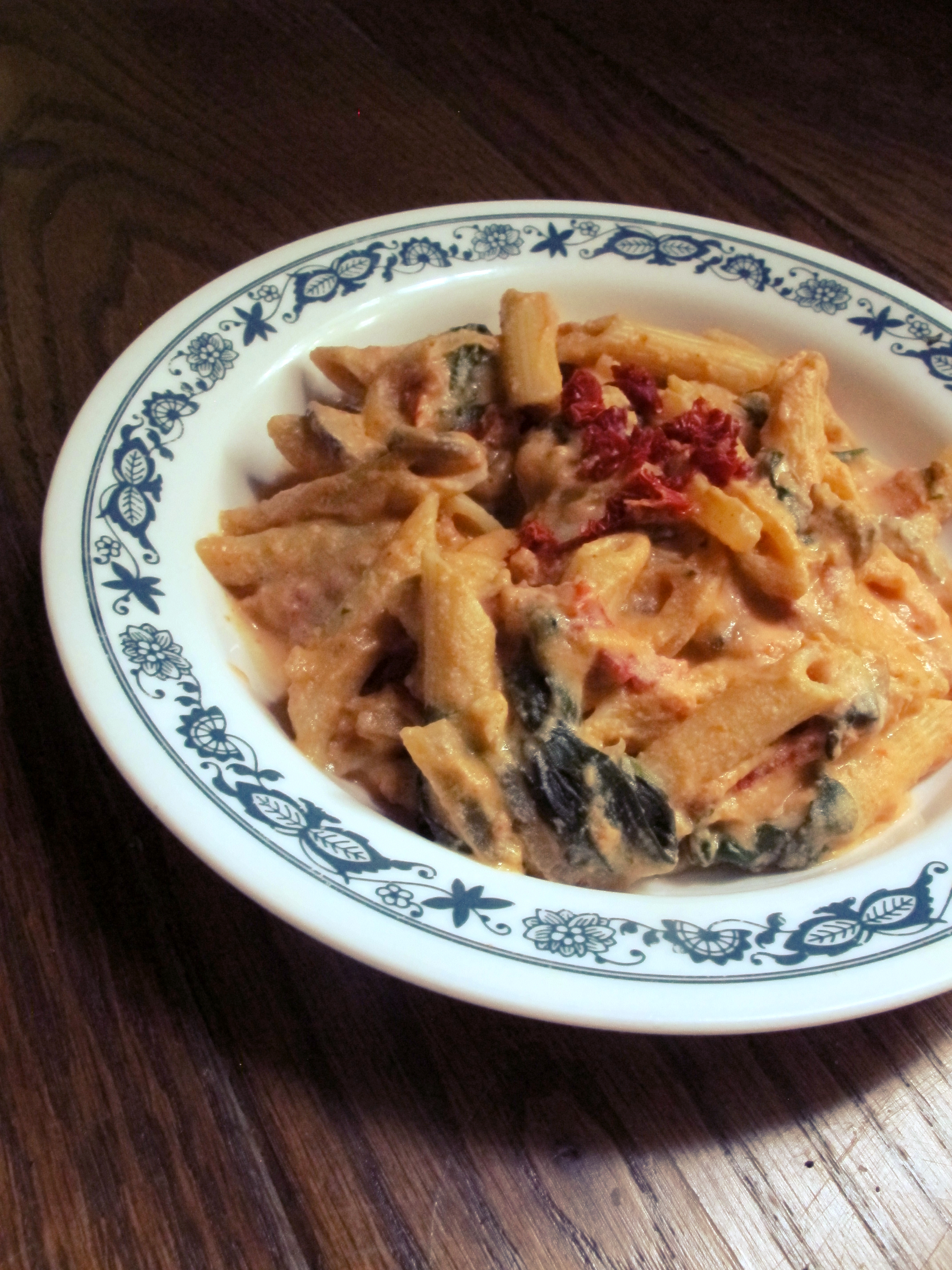
Sun dried tomato used as garnish for the vegan Penne

- Amandine – a culinary term indicating a garnish of almonds
- Bawang goreng – crisp fried shallot, a common garnish in Indonesian cuisine
- Carrot
- Caviar
- Sun dried tomato
- Celery
- Chives
- Chili pepper – julienne, rings or decoratively sliced
  - Chili threads
- Cilantro – coriander leaves
- Crouton
- Cucumber – julienne, rings or decoratively sliced
- Duxelles
- Egg garnish
- Fried onion – used as a garnish on steaks and other foods
- Gremolata
- Lemon basil
- Radish
- Manchette
- Microgreens – young vegetable greens that are used both as a visual and flavor component, ingredient and garnish
- Mint
- Nuts
- Ginger
- Parsley
- Persillade
- Sautéed mushrooms – used on steaks and other foods
- Edible seaweed – such as shredded nori sheet, used to garnish foods such as soups, entrees and sashimi
- Sesame seeds

=== Desserts and sweets ===
Garnishes for desserts and sweets include:

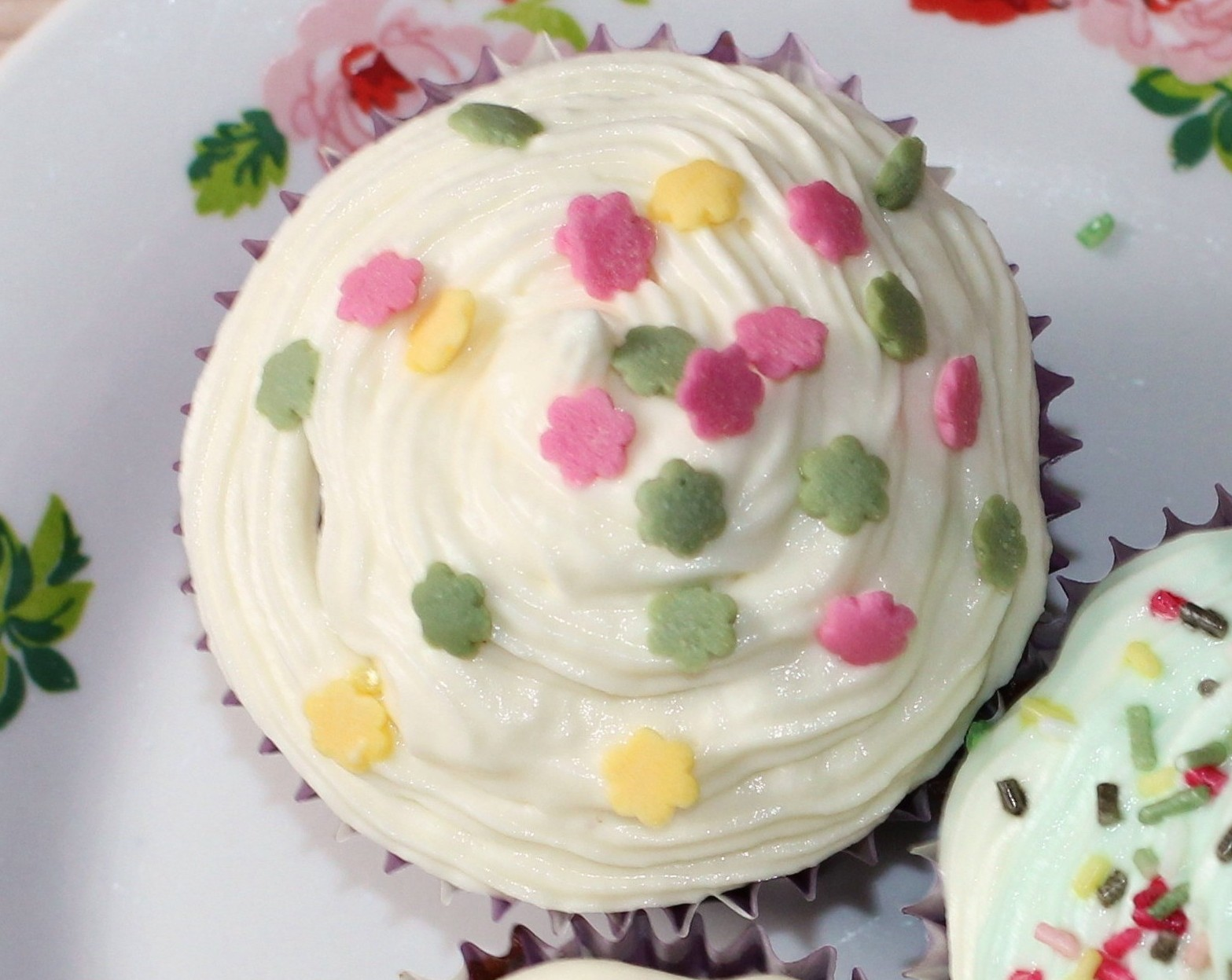
A frosted muffin garnished with confetti candy

- Caramel
- Chocolate (shaved or curled)
- Cocoa powder
- Flaked coconut
- Powdered sugar – Fine sugar with an anti-caking agent
- Confetti candy – Confectionery food
- Coulis – Thin sauce made from vegetables or fruits (raspberry coulis, for example)
- Edible flower – Flowers that may be consumed safely
- Sliced fruit – Seed-bearing part of a flowering plant
- Gomul – Edible powders in Korean cuisine
- Honey – Sweet and viscous substance made by bees
- Maraschino cherry – Preserved, sweetened cherry
- Mint – Family of flowering plants
- Sprinkles – Tiny multi-colored candy topping
- Syrup – Thick, viscous solution of sugar in water
- Vark – Metallic leaf used on Indian sweets
- Wafer – Thin type of biscuit
- Nuts
  - Walnut pieces and candied walnuts
- Wedding cake topper
- Whipped cream

=== Beverages ===
Garnishes for beverages include:

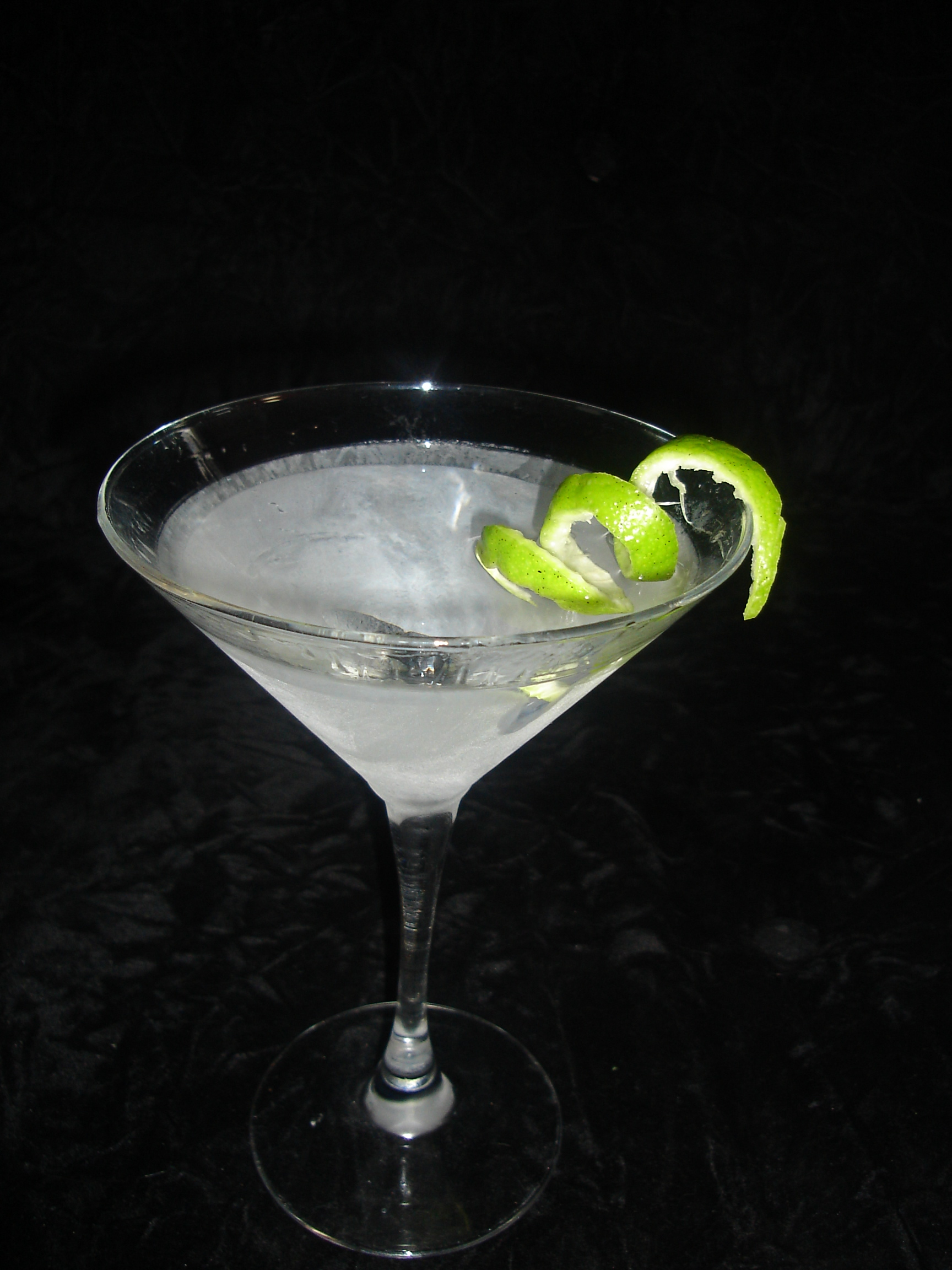
A gin martini with a lime twist

Coffee-based drinks may have:

- Cinnamon sticks or ground powder
- Cocoa powder

Savory drinks such as Bloody Mary may have:

- Carrot sticks
- Celery stalks (usually with leaves attached)
- Pepper
- Salt, coarse (applied to the rim of glasses)

Eggnog may have:

- Nutmeg, grated

Various fruits are used:

- Cherries
- Strawberries
- Lemon slice, twist, or wedge
- Lime slice, twist, or wedge
- Orange slice, twist, or wedge
- Pineapple slice or wedge
- Watermelon slice or wedge
- Cocktail garnish – Decorative element added to a drink
  - Cocktail onion – Pearl onion pickled in a brine
  - Cocktail umbrella – Small paper umbrella used as decoration
  - Green olive – Fruit of a cultivated plant
  - Mint – Family of flowering plants
  - Twist – Citrus zest garnishing a cocktail
  - Sugar, granulated or powdered

== Garnishes according to cuisine traditions ==
=== French garnishes ===
Classic French garnishes include

For soups:

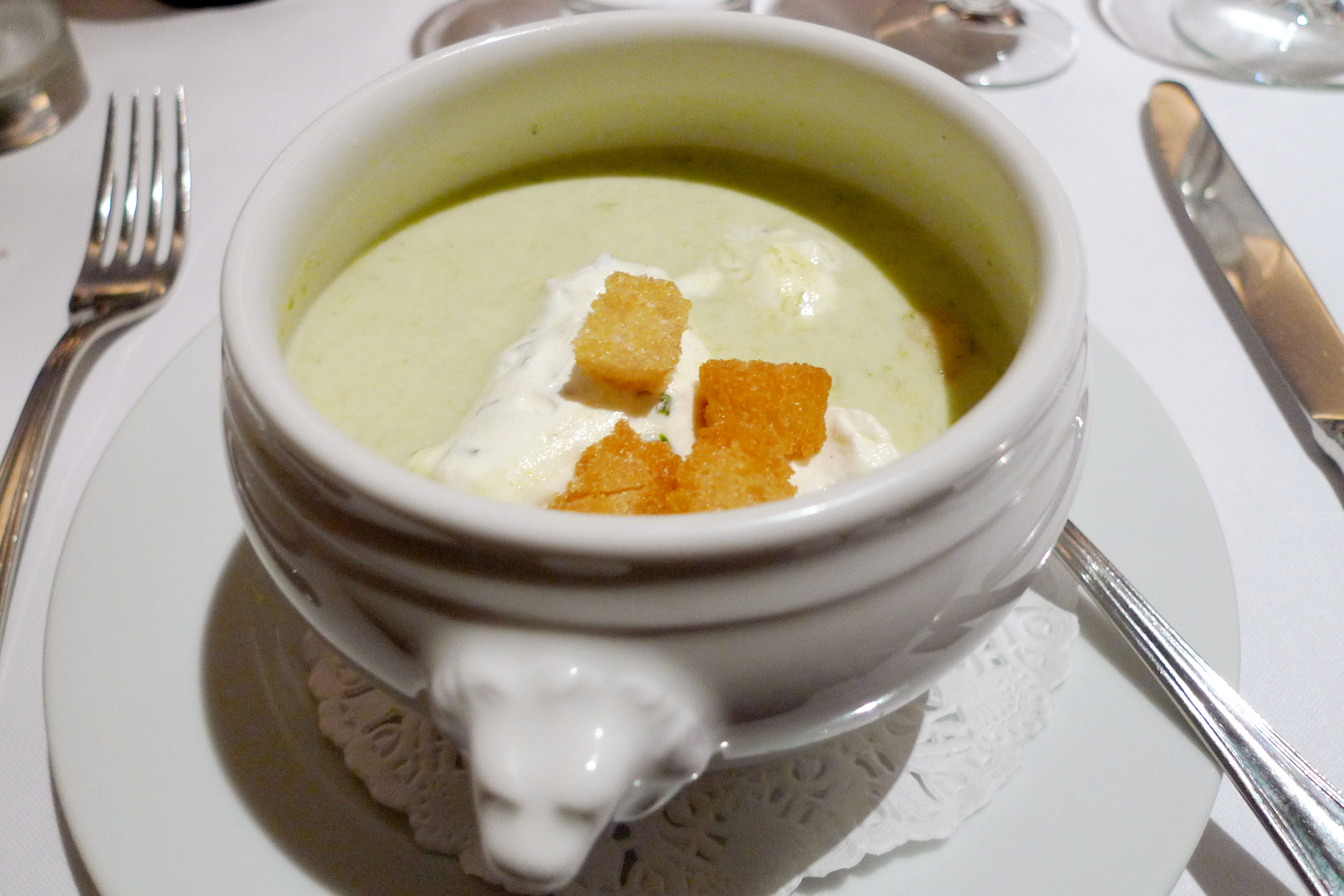
Chilled leek and potato soup garnished with croutons

- Brunoise – one to three mm diced vegetables
- Chiffonade – finely shredded lettuce or sorrel stewed in butter
- Croutes – small pieces of halved French bread buttered and oven dried
- Coulis – (a thicker soup) drizzled decoratively
- Croutons – small pieces of bread (typically cubes) fried in butter or other oil
- Julienne – thinly sliced vegetables
- Pasta (tapioca, sago, salep) etc.
- Pluches – a whole leaf spray of herbs, without the central stalk (traditionally chervil)
- Profiterolles – puff pastry stuffed with purée
- Royale – a small decoratively shaped piece of egg custard (in German this is called an Eierstich)
- Threaded eggs

For relevés and entrées:

- Croquettes
- Potatoes (pommes dauphine, Duchess potatoes or Marquis)
- Duxelles – fried onion, mushrooms and herbs
- Matignon – minced carrots, onions, and celeries with ham stewed in butter and Madeira
- Mirepoix – similar to Matignon but diced (cf. minced) with or without ham (or with bacon substituted for the ham)
- Polonaise – Polish-style garnish with melted butter, bread crumbs, chopped boiled egg, lemon juice and herbs over cooked vegetables
- Salpicon – a variety of other diced meats or vegetables
- Fritters

=== Indonesian garnishes ===
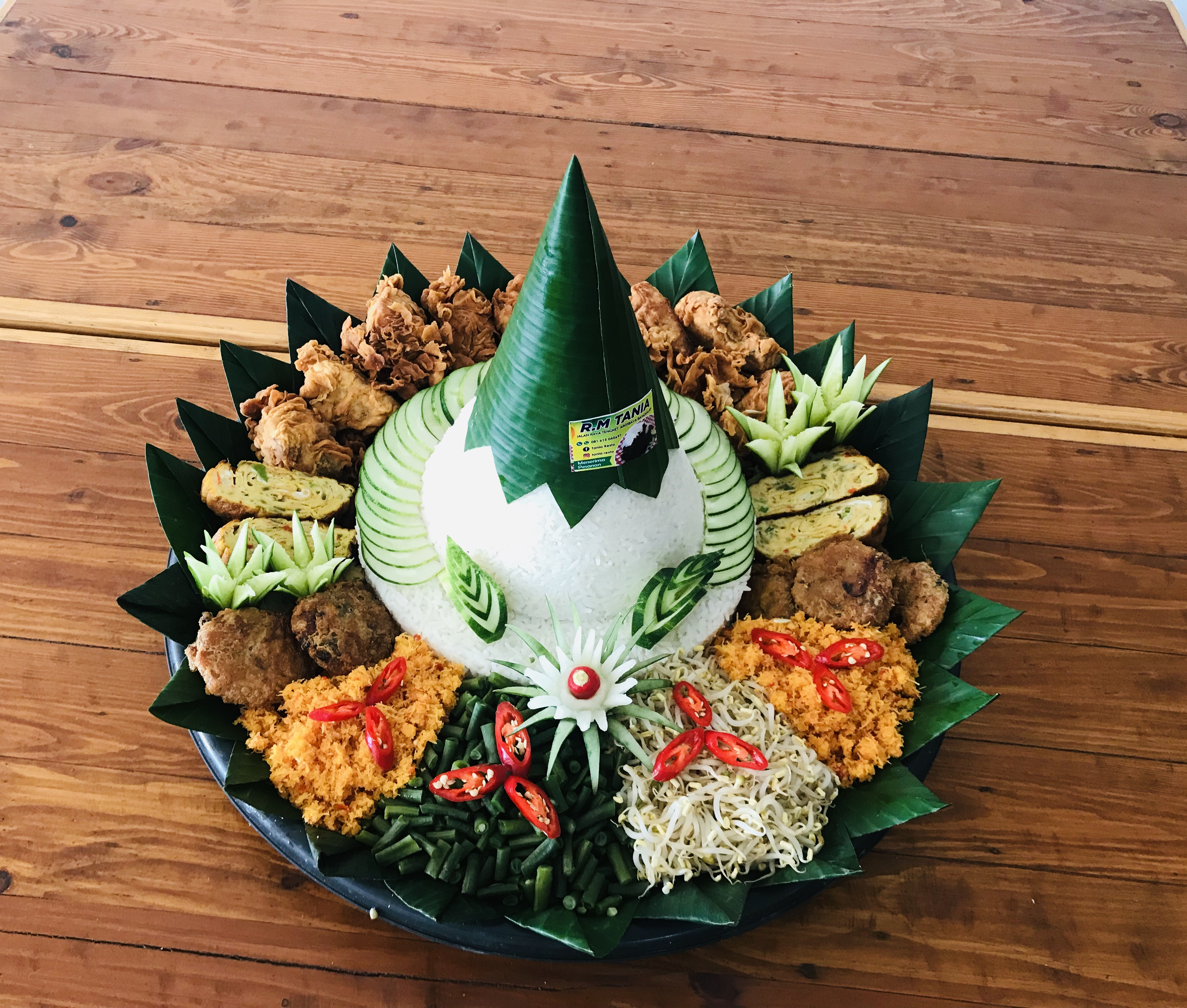
Indonesian festive tumpeng rice cone, garnished with decoratively sliced chili pepper and cucumber.

- Bawang goreng – crisp fried shallot, a common garnish in Indonesian cuisine
- Young carrot leaf
- Celery – locally known as daun seledri used as topping for soups or rice congee
- Chili pepper – sliced decoratively
- Cilantro
- Cucumber – sliced decoratively
- Flaked coconut – grated coconut flesh, usually used in traditional kue sweet dessert snacks; such as klepon, putu and lupis
- Emping – melinjo nut crackers
- Krupuk – various traditional crackers
- Lemon basil – locally known as daun kemangi
- Tomato – sliced decoratively

=== Japanese garnishes ===
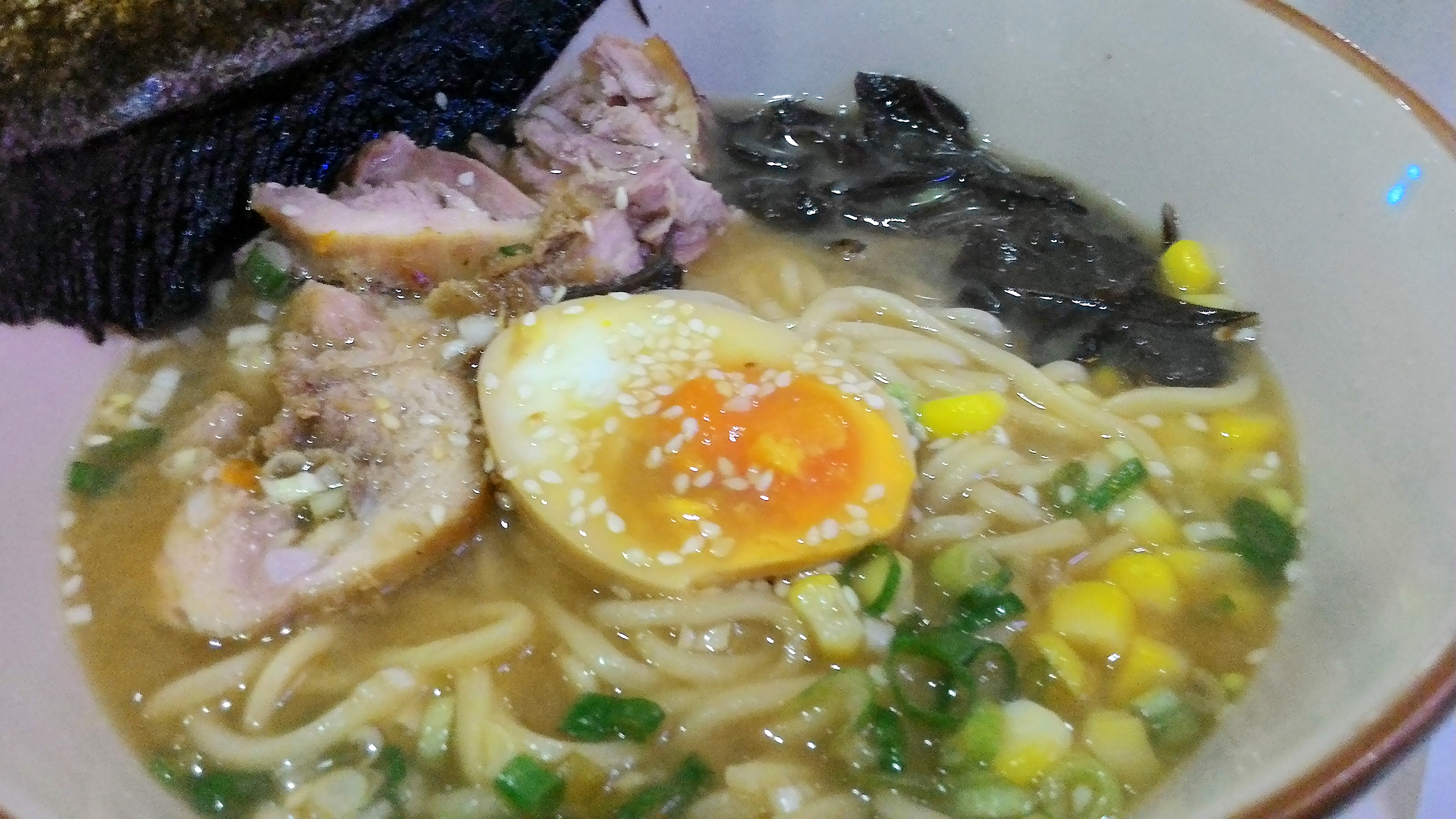
Japanese miso ramen garnished with edible seaweed, sesame and scallion

- Beni shōga – julienne pickled ginger, usually used as a garnish for gyudon and okonomiyaki
- Gari – marinated thinly sliced ginger, usually used as a garnish for sushi and sashimi
- Katsuobushi – dried bonito flakes, usually used as a garnish for takoyaki, sometimes called okaka
- Scallion or tree onion (wakegi) – mostly used as topping of tofu and miso soup
- Various edible seaweed – including thinly sliced kizami nori sheets, Aonori, Tororo Kombu used widely as topping of ramen, udon, yakiudon, Takoyaki, soba, okonomiyaki, yakisoba, or even pizza and hotdogs
- Sesame seeds – sprinkled on steamed rice or noodles
- Shiso leaf
- Fukujinzuke, a condiment and garnish for curry dishes
- Kinshi tamago, shredded strips of eggs popular on rice porridge, and hiyashi chuka a cold mixed ramen salad
- Fish roe such as tobiko, masago, mentaiko, and ikura are popular on rice dishes such as chirashi and sushi as well
- Shredded daikon and ground daikon called daikon oroshi, a winter radish, is popular in bento and sushi dishes, the latter is popular on oily foods such as fish and tempura
- Sakura, star, heart and various shaped carrot garnishes are popular in bento
- Garlic chives
- Whitebait such as shirasu and chirimenjako
- Edible flowers such as chrysanthemum
- Furikake
- Umeboshi
- Nameko mushrooms
- Menma fermented seasoned bamboo shoots
- Soy egg
- Narutomaki
- Mitsuba, Cryptotaenia japonica
- Tenkasu, fried bits of batter which defines tanuki udon
- Aburage, fried tofu which defines kitsune udon
- Kamaboko, a surimi often found in bento and hot pot udon
- Wasabi
- Yuzukosho

=== Korean garnishes ===
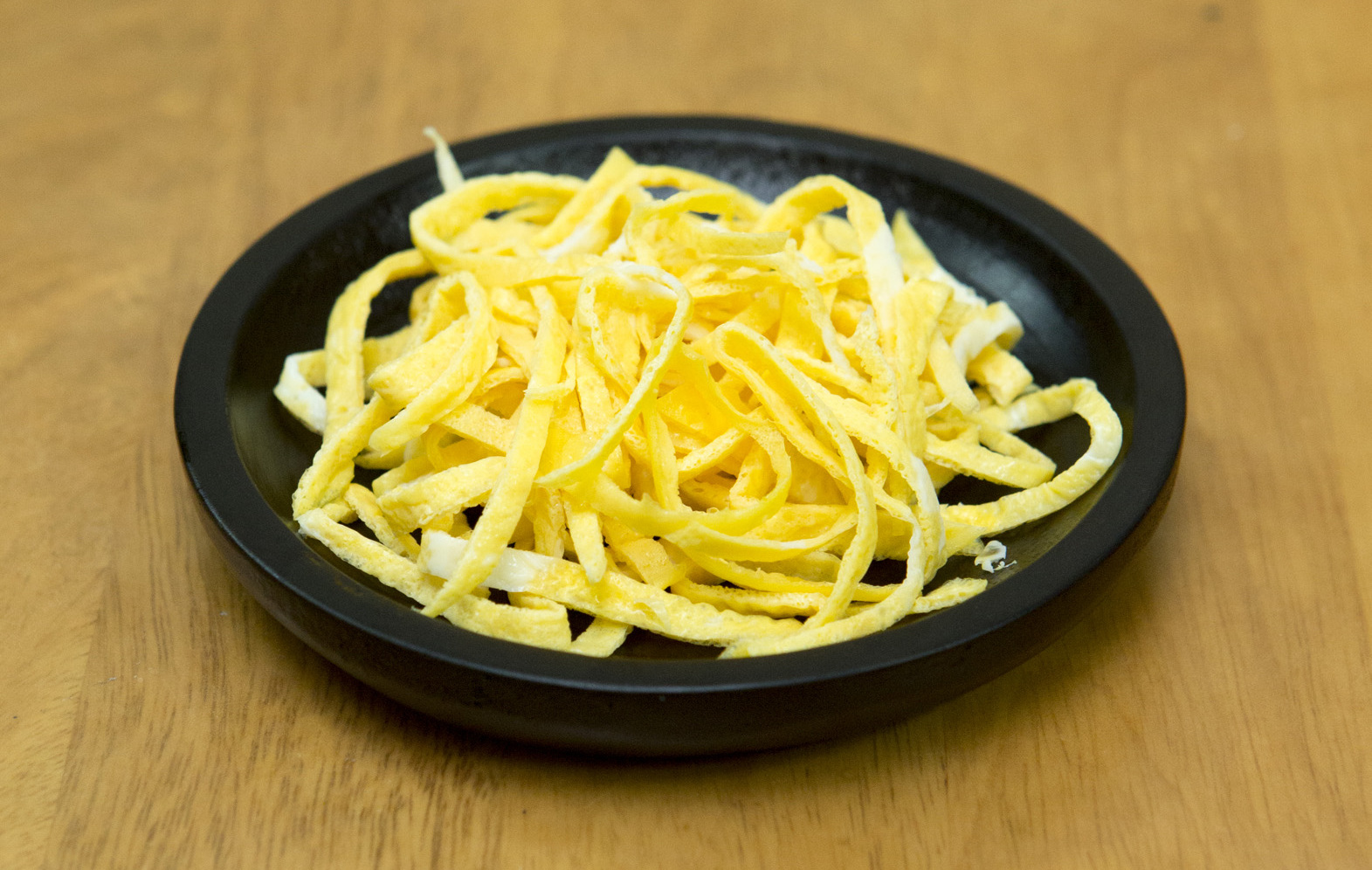
Jidan, a Korean egg garnish for soups

In Korean cuisine, decorative garnishes are referred to as gomyeong (고명), means to decorate or embellish food.

- Chrysanthemum leaves
- Egg garnish – a common topping in Korean cuisine, made with egg whites and egg yolks.
- Gochu – red chili pepper
  - Chili thread – a traditional Korean garnish made with chili peppers.
- Crushed garlic
- Green onions
- Manna lichen
- Scallions
- Shiitake
- Shredded vegetables

== Garnish tools ==
Tools often used for creating food garnishes include skewers, knives, graters, toothpicks, and parchment cones.

== Gallery ==
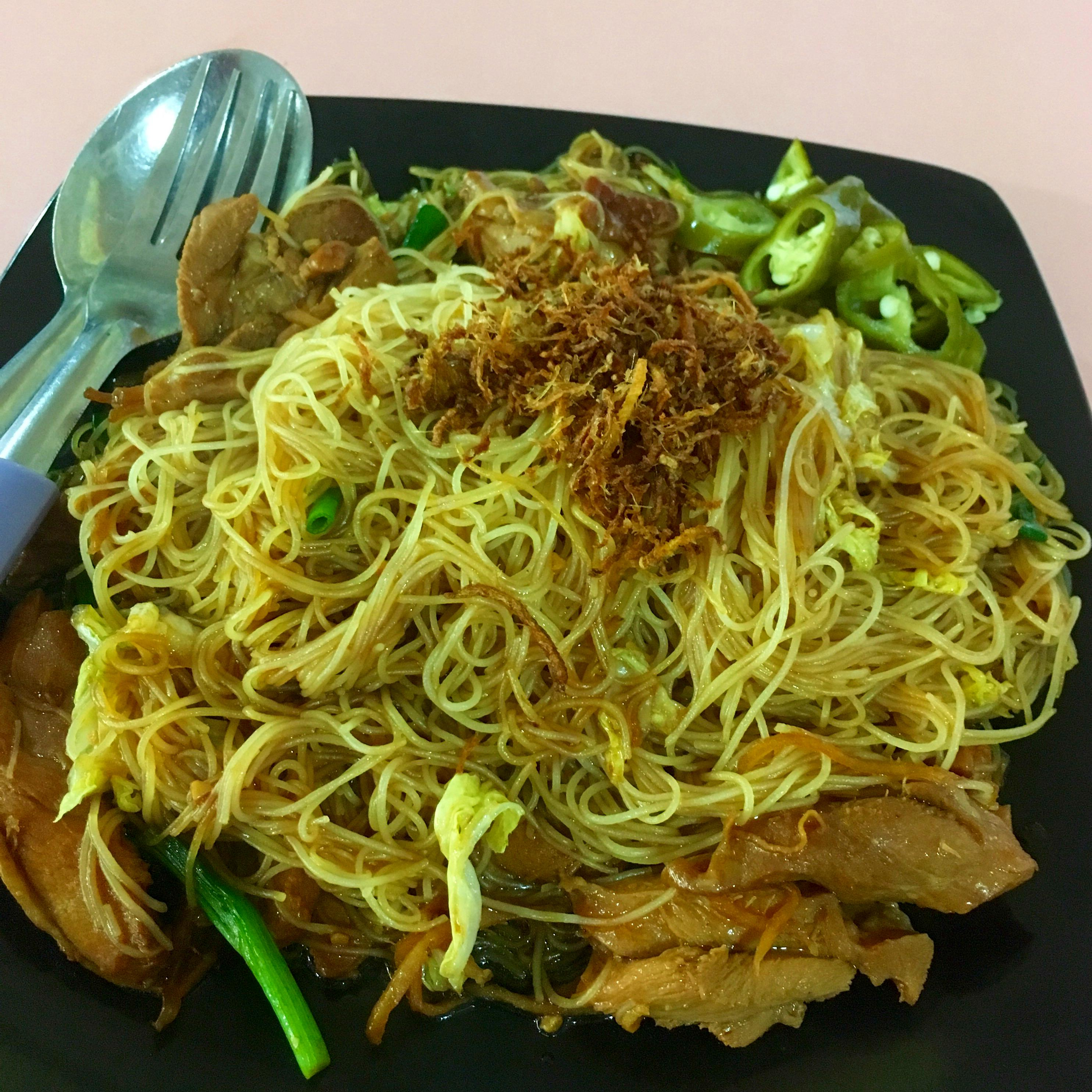
Fried onions garnishing a plate of chicken noodles

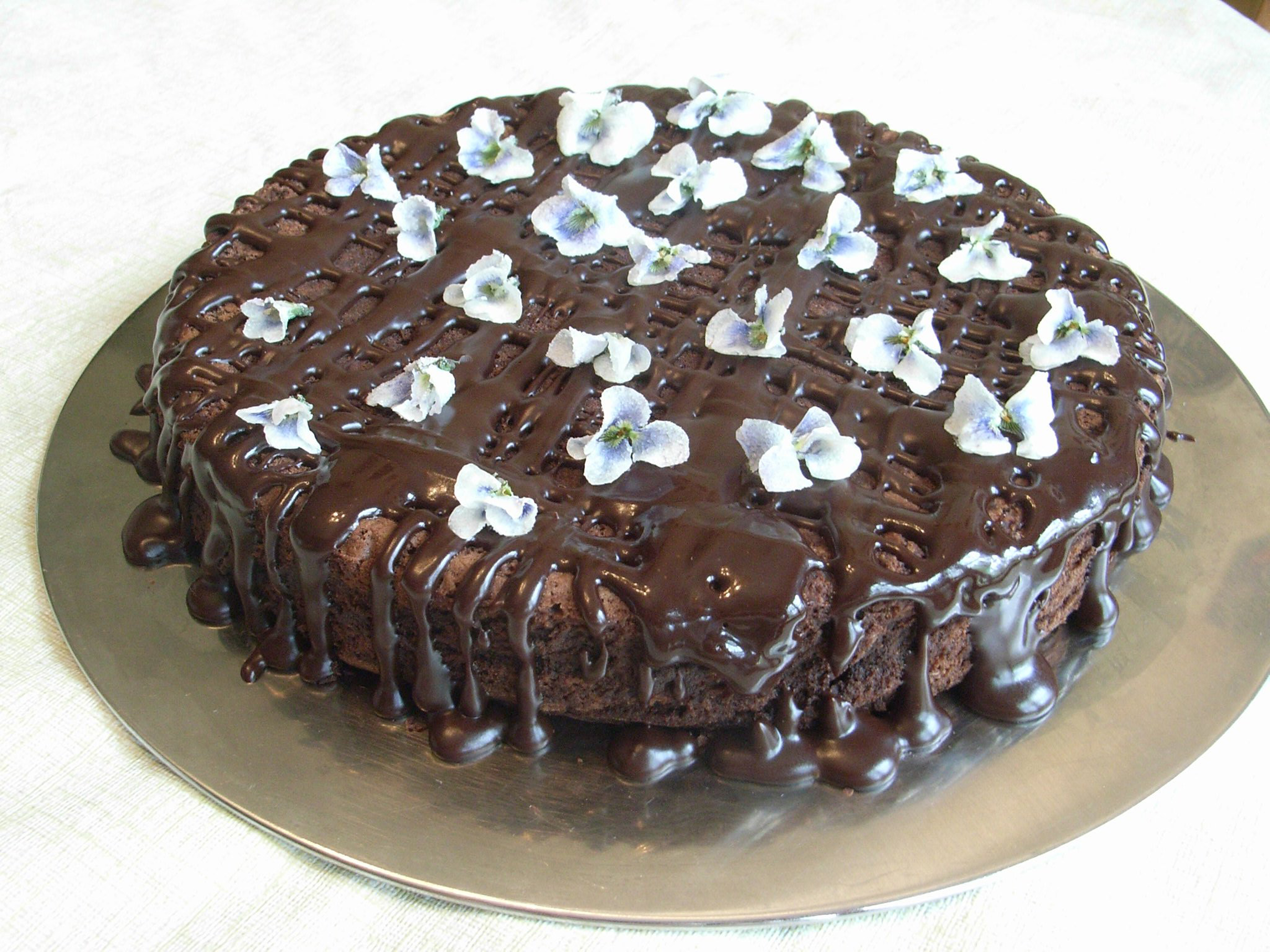
A chocolate cake garnished with violets

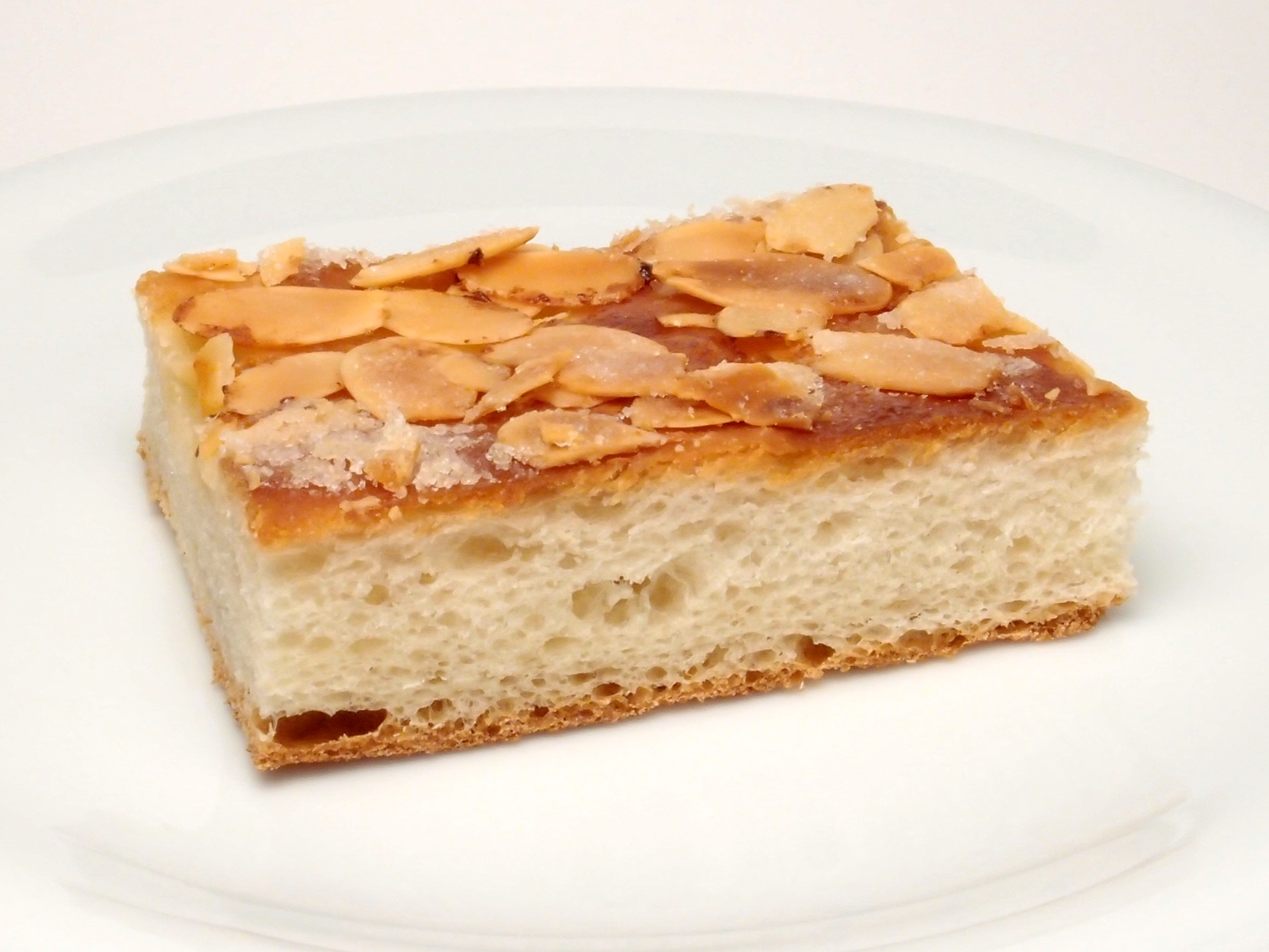
A slice of butter cake garnished with sliced almonds

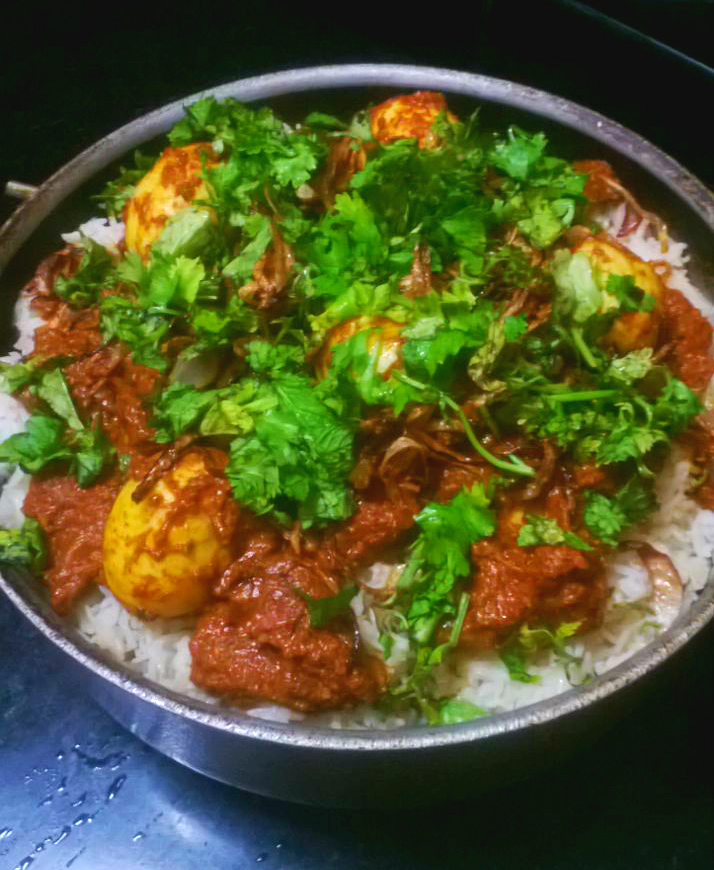
Egg Biryani garnished with cilantro

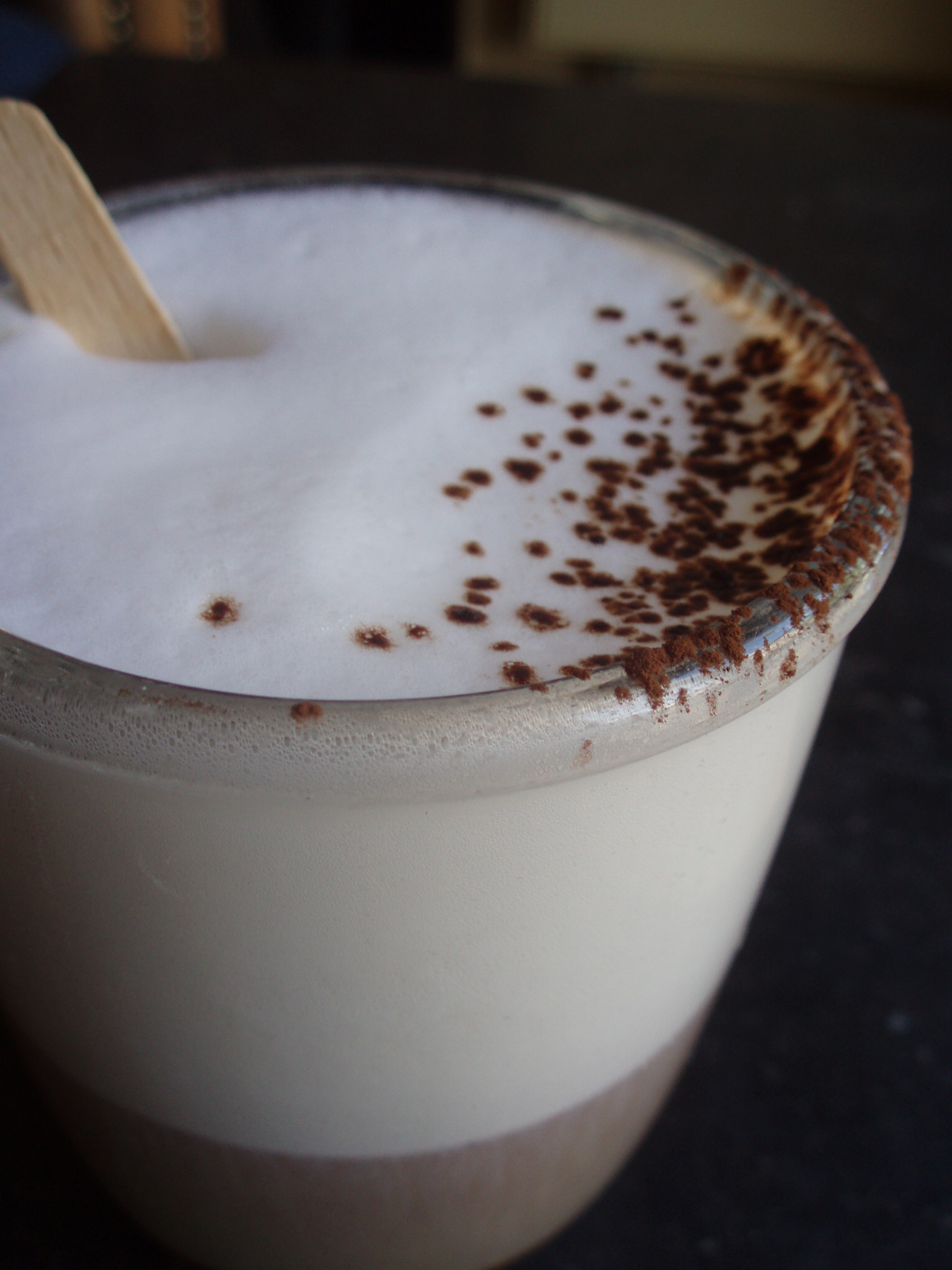
A cappuccino garnished with cocoa powder

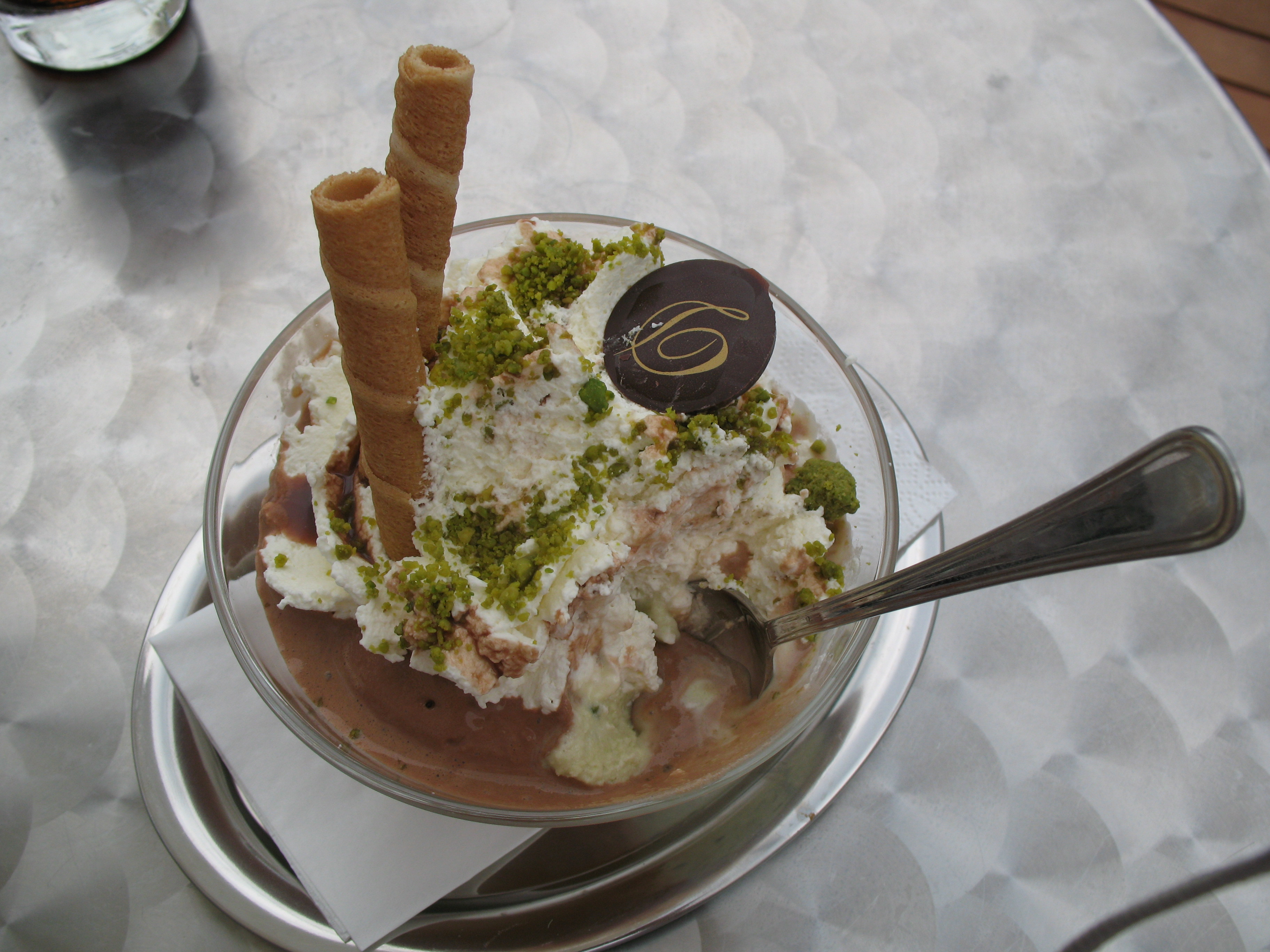
Ice cream garnished with pistachio pieces and rolled wafers

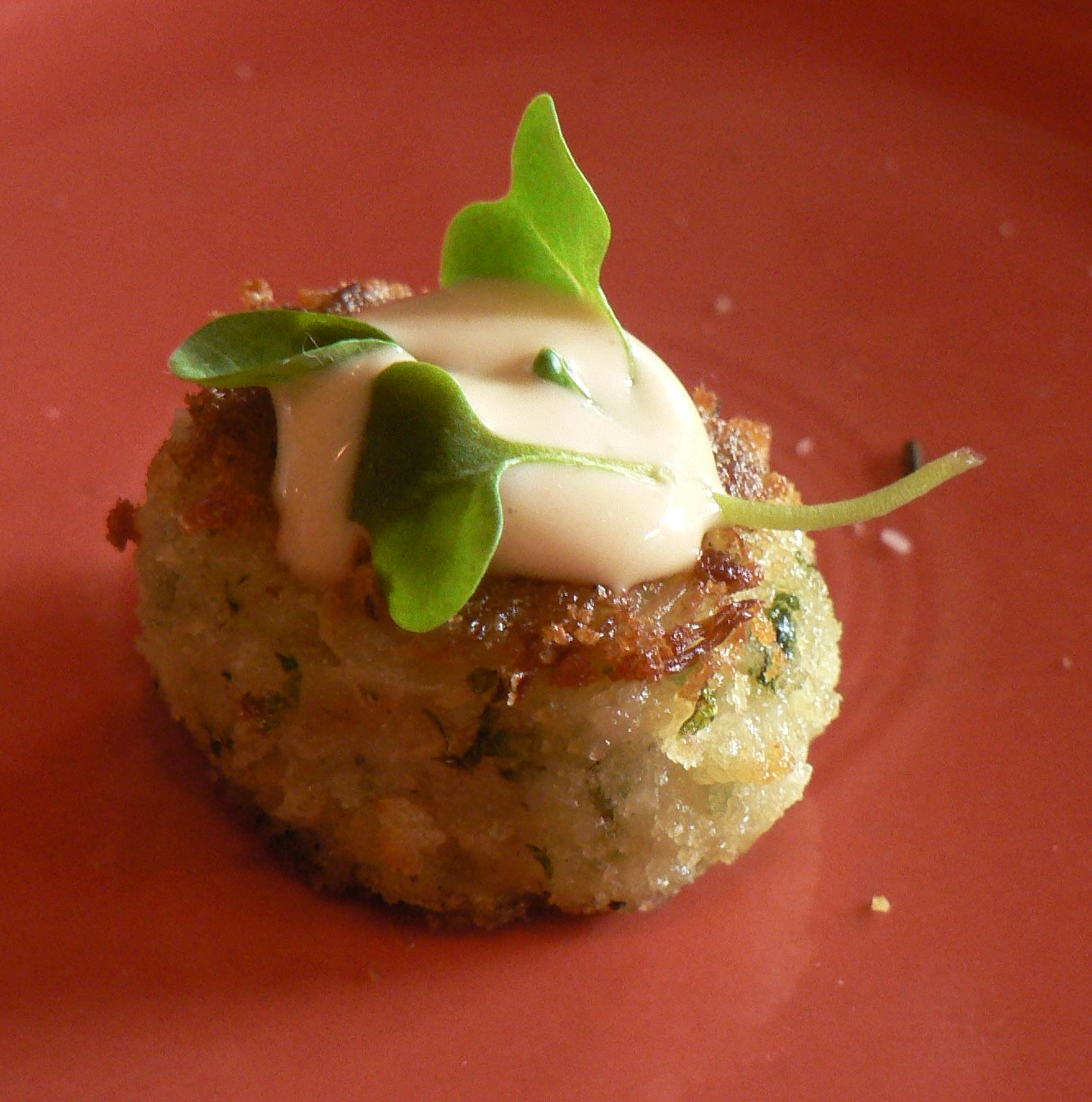
A crabcake with a cream sauce and a garnish of microgreens

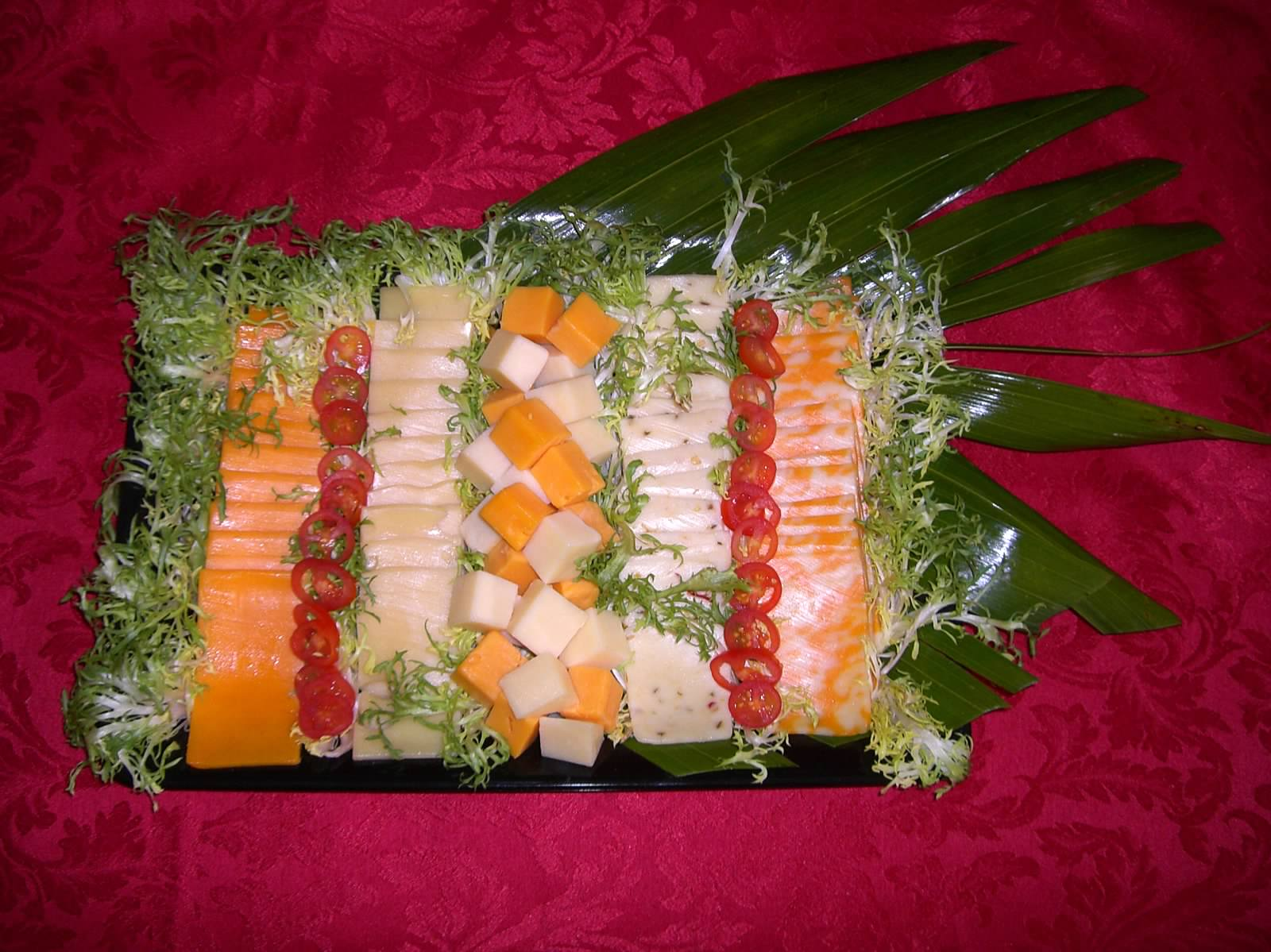
Cheese tray garnished with sliced cherry tomatoes and escarole

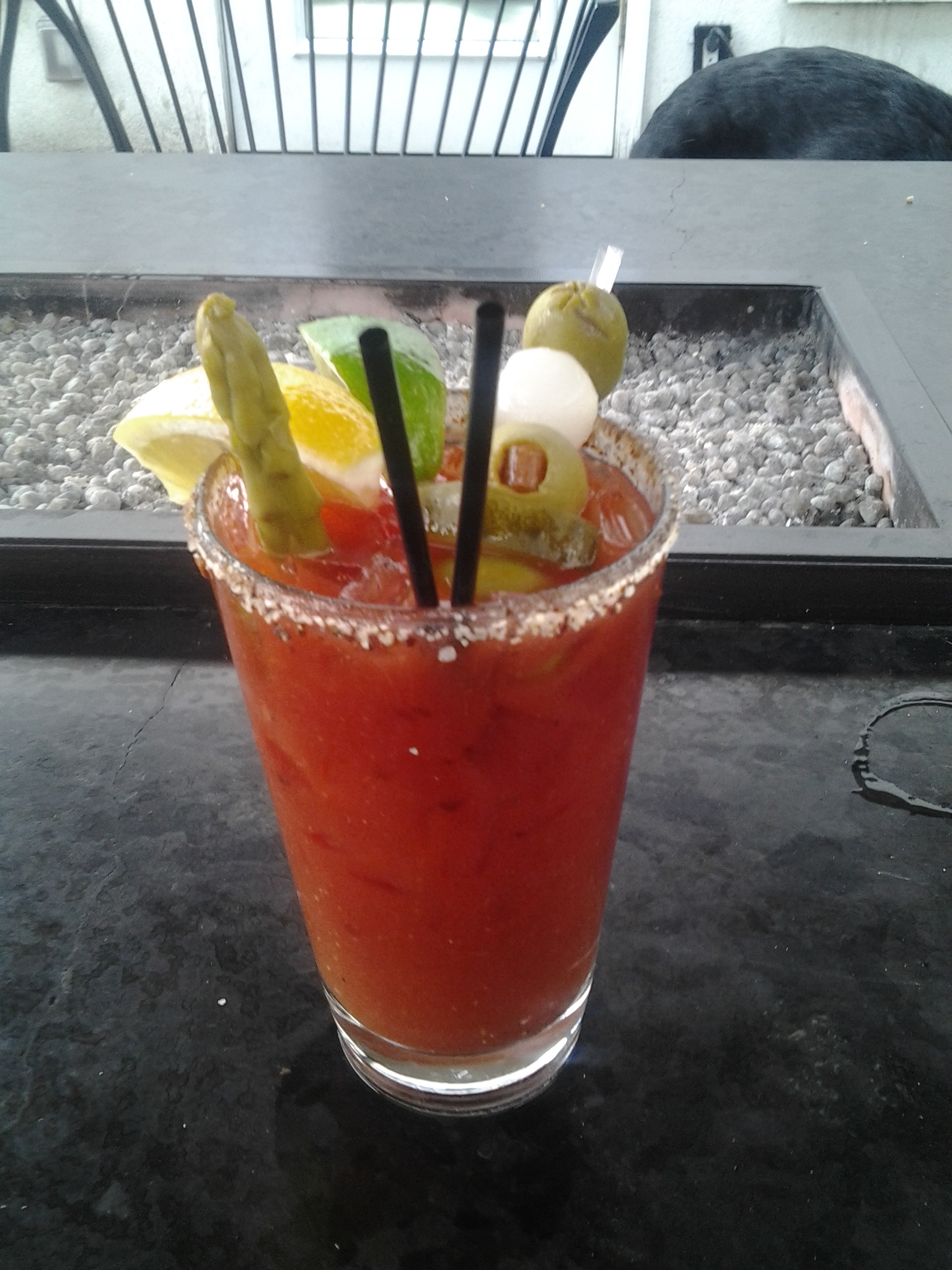
A Bloody Mary with several garnishes

== See also ==
- Cake decorating
- Cocktail garnish
- Food presentation
- Garde manger
- Hors d'oeuvre
- Tuile
