= Seon (food) =

Korean steamed vegetable dishes

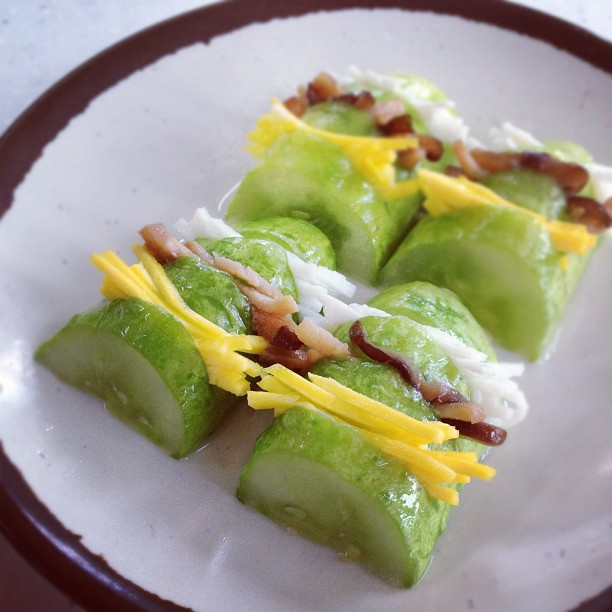
- Oiseon, made with cucumber and meat.

Korean name
- Hangul: 선
- Hanja: 膳
- RR: seon
- MR: sŏn

Seon (Korean: 선) is a traditional Korean dish made from steamed vegetables such as zucchini, cucumber, eggplant or Napa cabbage and stuffed with meat. Although the term is a counterpart of jjim—a category of dishes that are made by steaming meat or seafood—the concept is not clearly settled.

Other dishes similar to seon include gajiseon (가지선, steamed eggplant), gochuseon (고추선, steamed chili pepper), donggwaseon (동과선, steamed winter melon), museon (무선, steamed radish), baechuseon (steamed Napa cabbage) and dubuseon (steamed tofu).

== Preparation ==
To make a hobakseon (호박선) or oiseon (오이선), a cucumber (or zucchini) is cut into pieces about 4 to 5 cm. in length and then quartered. The pieces are lightly salted and then slightly squeezed to drain water from them. Beef or chicken, along with onion, is chopped and mixed with seasonings to make the stuffing. Then, prepared pieces of the cucumber are stuffed with the meat and placed in a pot. After that, pour the vegetable broth on the ingredients until they are partially covered with liquid. Soaked and stuffed cucumber boiled or steamed with the sauce for about 5–10 minutes. The dish is served with slices of seogi (석이, Umbilicaria esculenta), chili threads and egg garnish place on top of the cucumber, similarly to gomyeong (고명, garnishes).

== In historical cookbooks ==
According to Ŭmsik timibang, a Korean cookbook written during mid-Joseon dynasty, the historical recipe of the donggwaseon (동과선, a variety of seon made with dongga (winter melon)) is very different from today's version.

Thick slices of winter melon are lightly parboiled in the water and put into a bowl with the boiled mixture of ganjang, water and oil. In a new bowl boiled ganjang is mixed with minced ginger and then, poured over the vegetables. Donggwaseon is served with vinegar which is spread over the dish.

In Siui jeonseo, a cookbook written in the late 19th century, a recipe of hobakseon (호박선, a zucchini seon) is similar to the modern one. A zucchini is hollowed out, filled with various condiments and then steamed. A sauce made with vinegar, ganjang and honey is poured over the ready dish. The dish is served with sliced chili pepper, seogi (석이 Umbilicaria esculenta) and jidan (fried eggs) that are placed on the zucchini and sprinkled with pine nuts.

However, the term did not reach its modern meaning until the late 1930s. Cookbooks that were written before that time use the term very differently. They refer to cheongeoseon (청어선, steamed and stuffed herring), yangseon (양선, steamed and stuffed beef intestine), or dalgyalseon (달걀선, steamed eggs).

Today, the term "seon" refers to dish made from stuffed vegetables.

== Gallery ==
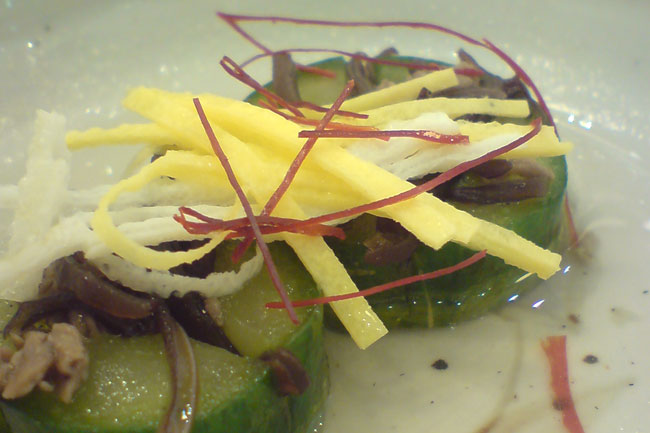
Oi-seon (stuffed cucumber)

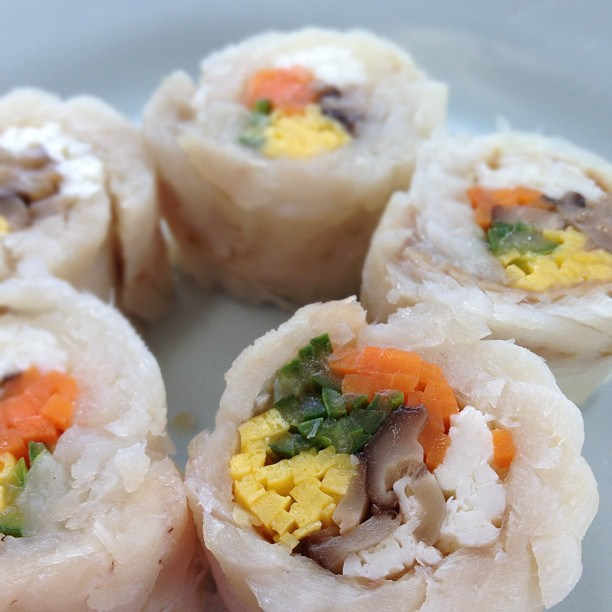
Eoseon (fish rolls)

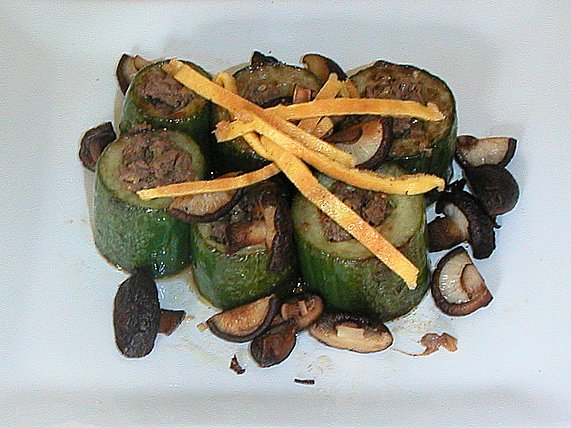
Another type of oi-seon

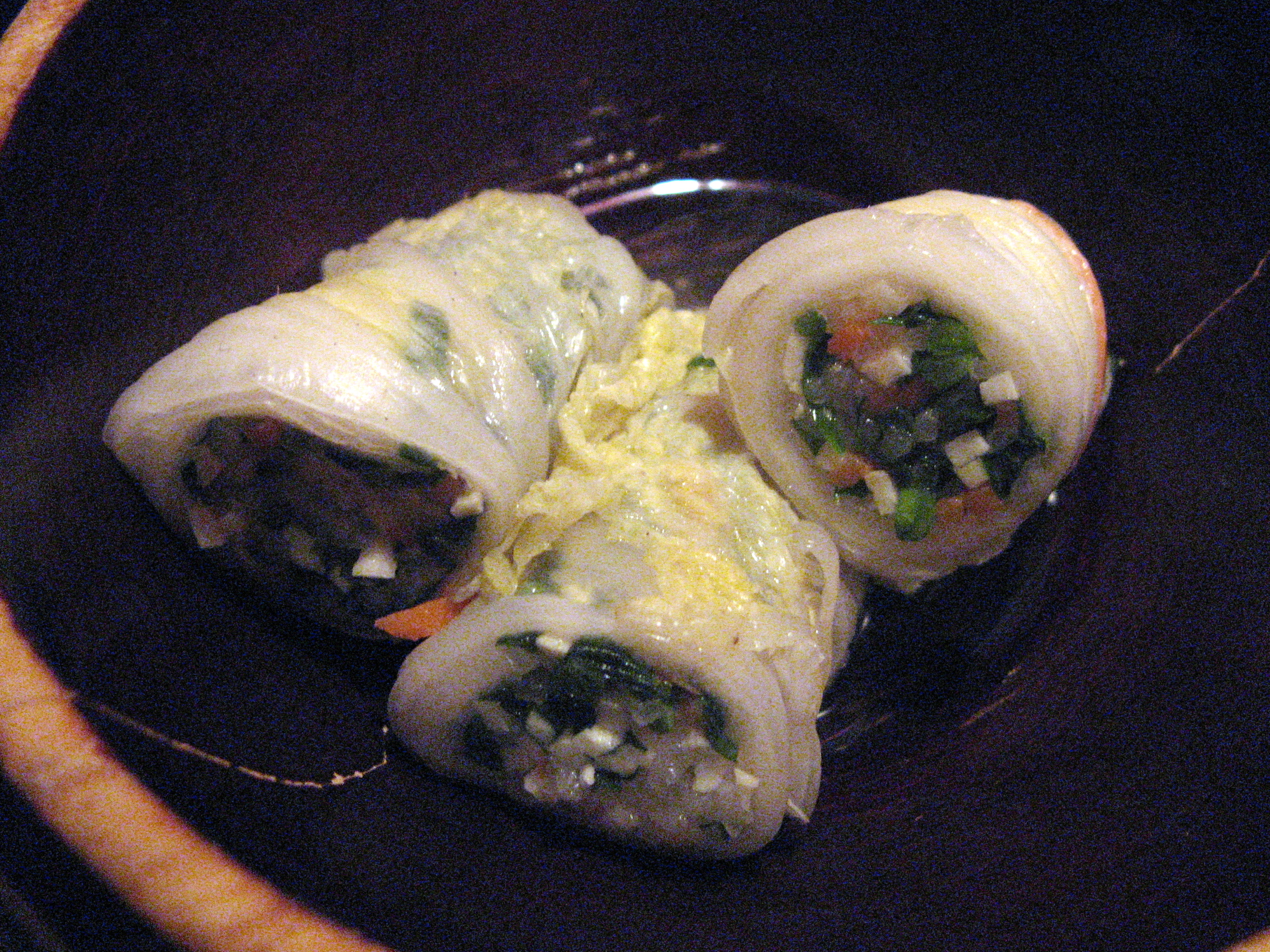
Baechu-seon (stuffed napa cabbage rolls)

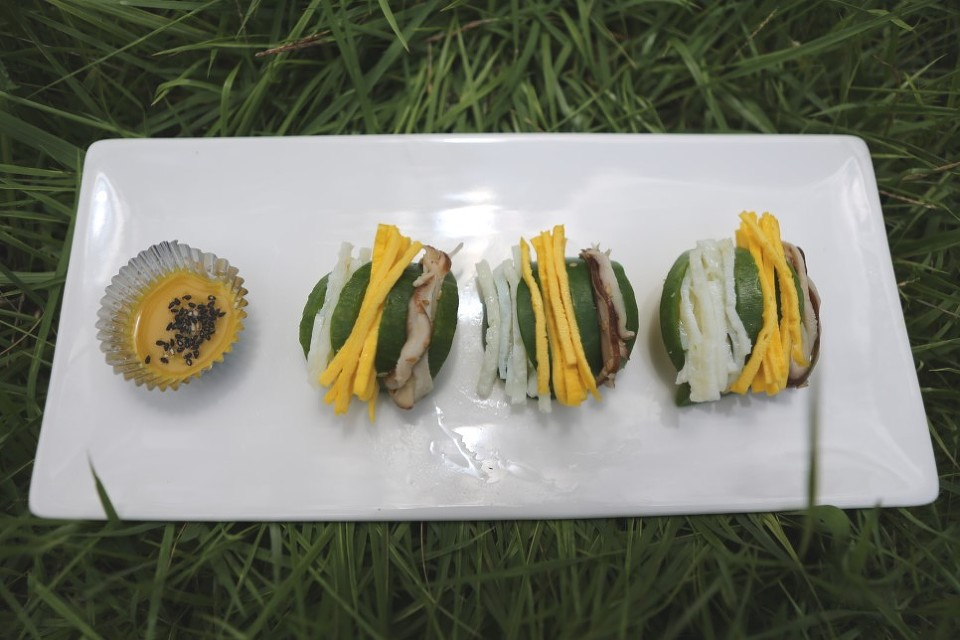
Hobak-seon (stuffed Korean zucchini)

== See also ==
- Jjim
- Bokkeum
- Mandu (dumpling)
- Korean cuisine
- List of steamed foods
