= Chili thread =

Korean food garnish

Chili threads
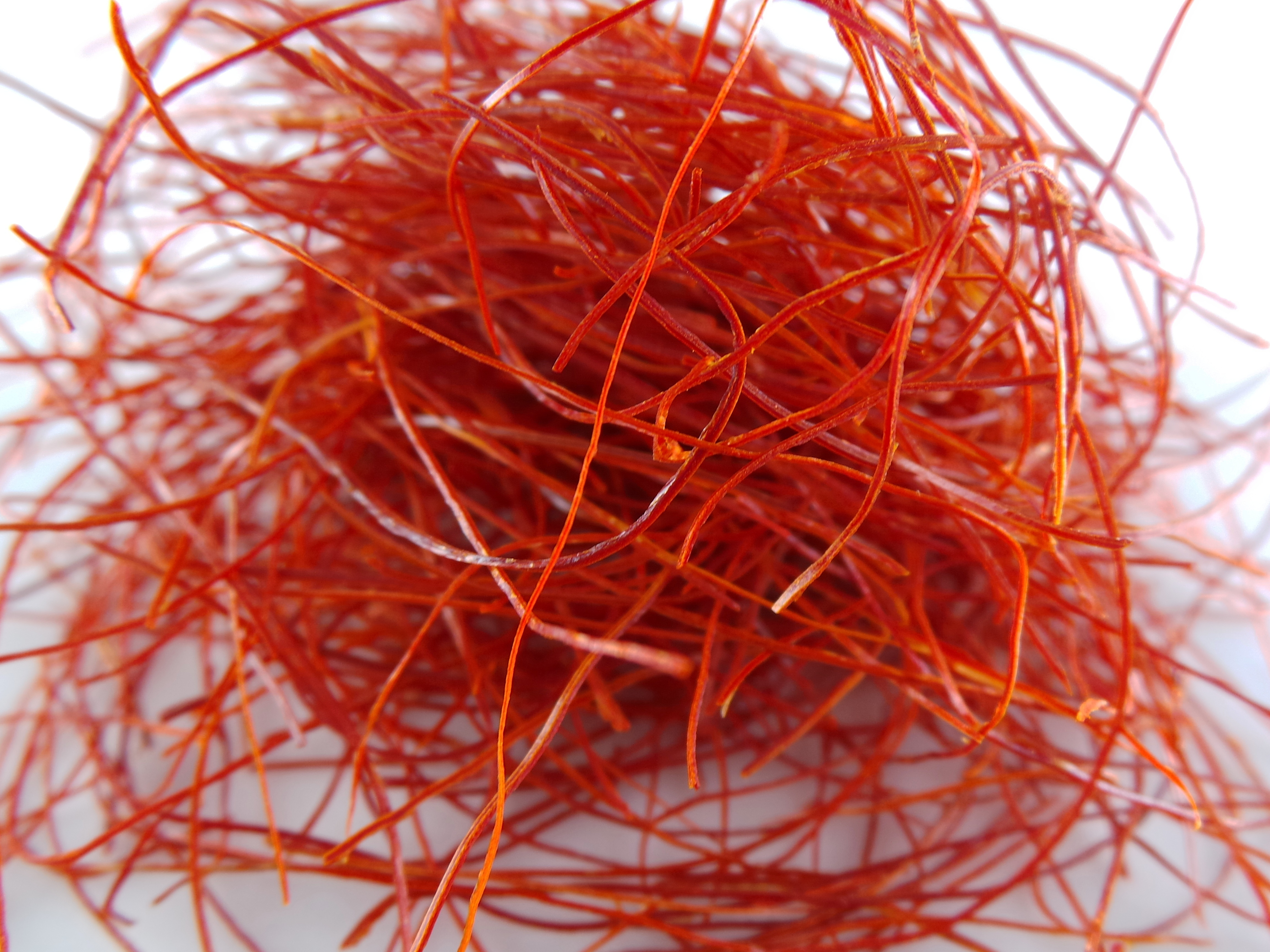
- Alternative names: Chilli threads, chili pepper threads, sil-gochu
- Type: Garnish
- Place of origin: Korea
- Associated cuisine: Korean cuisine
- Main ingredients: Chili peppers

Korean name
- Hangul: 실고추
- RR: silgochu
- MR: silgoch'u
- IPA: ɕil.ɡo.tɕʰu

Sil-gochu (Korean: 실고추), often translated as chili threads, chilli threads, or chili pepper threads, is a traditional Korean food garnish made with chili peppers.

== Gallery ==
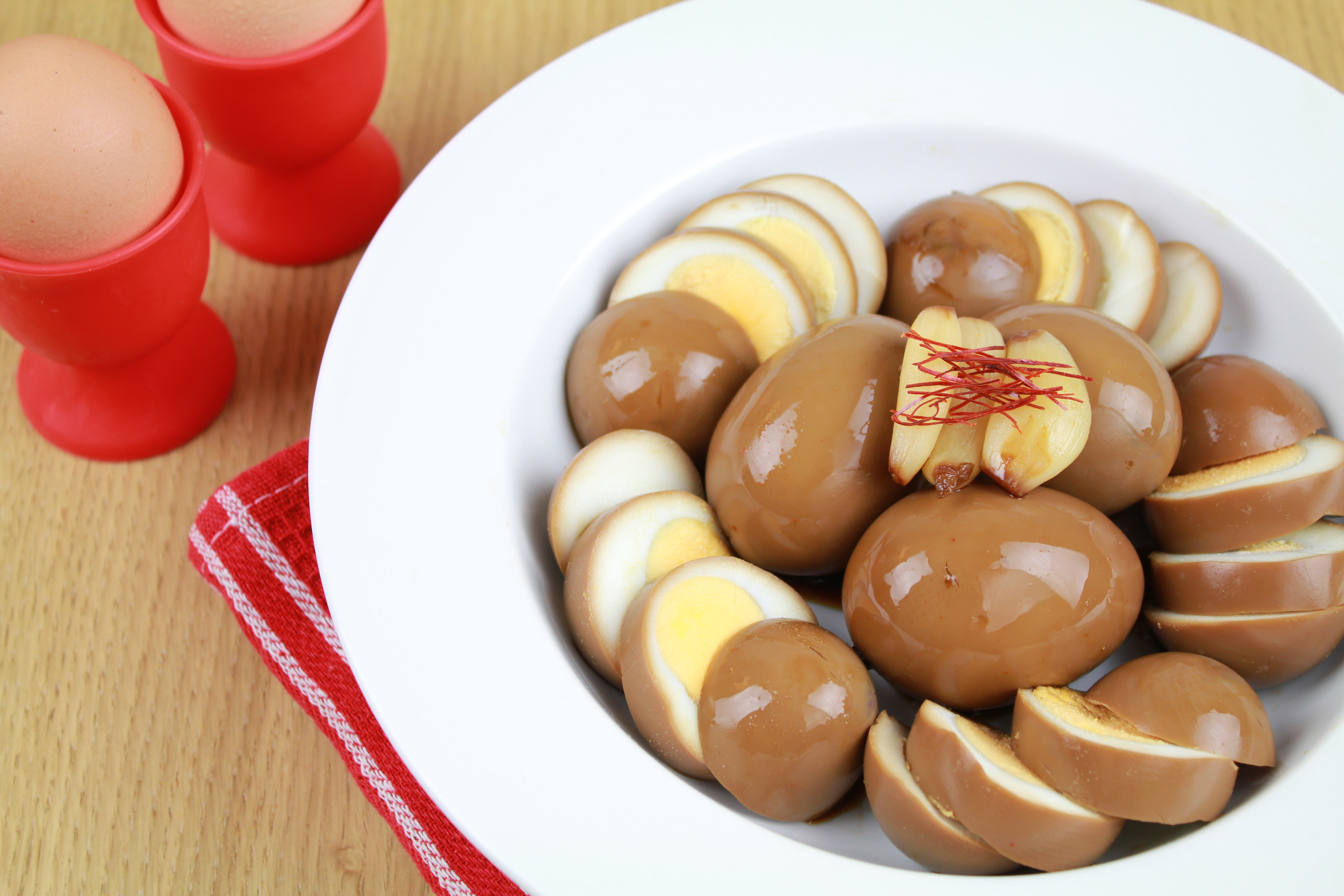
Gyeran-jang-jorim (soy-sauce-simmered eggs) topped with sil-gochu (chili threads)

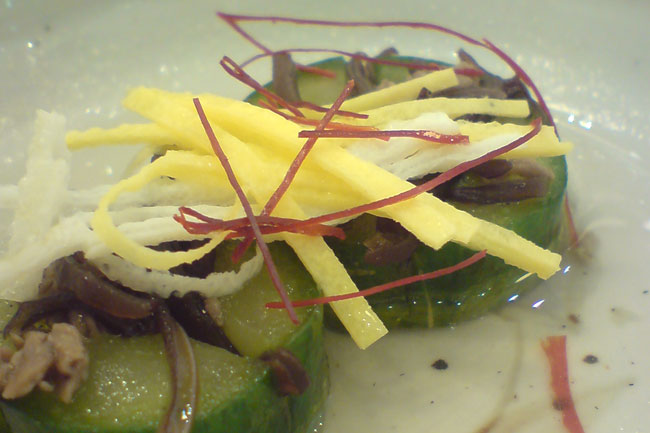
Oi-seon (stuffed cucumber) topped with sil-gochu

== See also ==
- Egg garnish
