= Greek-style fish =

Polish Christmas dish

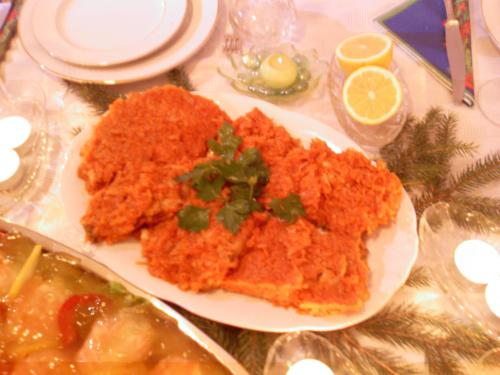
Greek-style fish

Greek-style fish is a dish known in Poland possibly based on Greek Psari Plaki, served hot or cold, which is prepared from fried pieces or fillets of fish in vegetable sauce. Basic sauce ingredients are grated carrots, parsley root, celery, onion as well as tomato concentrate. All of them are fried in oil and then braised with water, salt, pepper and spices (traditionally allspice, bay leaf and sometimes other ones). After frying, fish is shortly braised with previously stewed vegetables.

Braised fish in previously stewed and grated mirepoix with onion used to be called gefilte fish.

In Poland, Greek-style fish is eaten on Christmas Eve as a meatless fasting dish.
