= Rack of lamb =

Cut of lamb

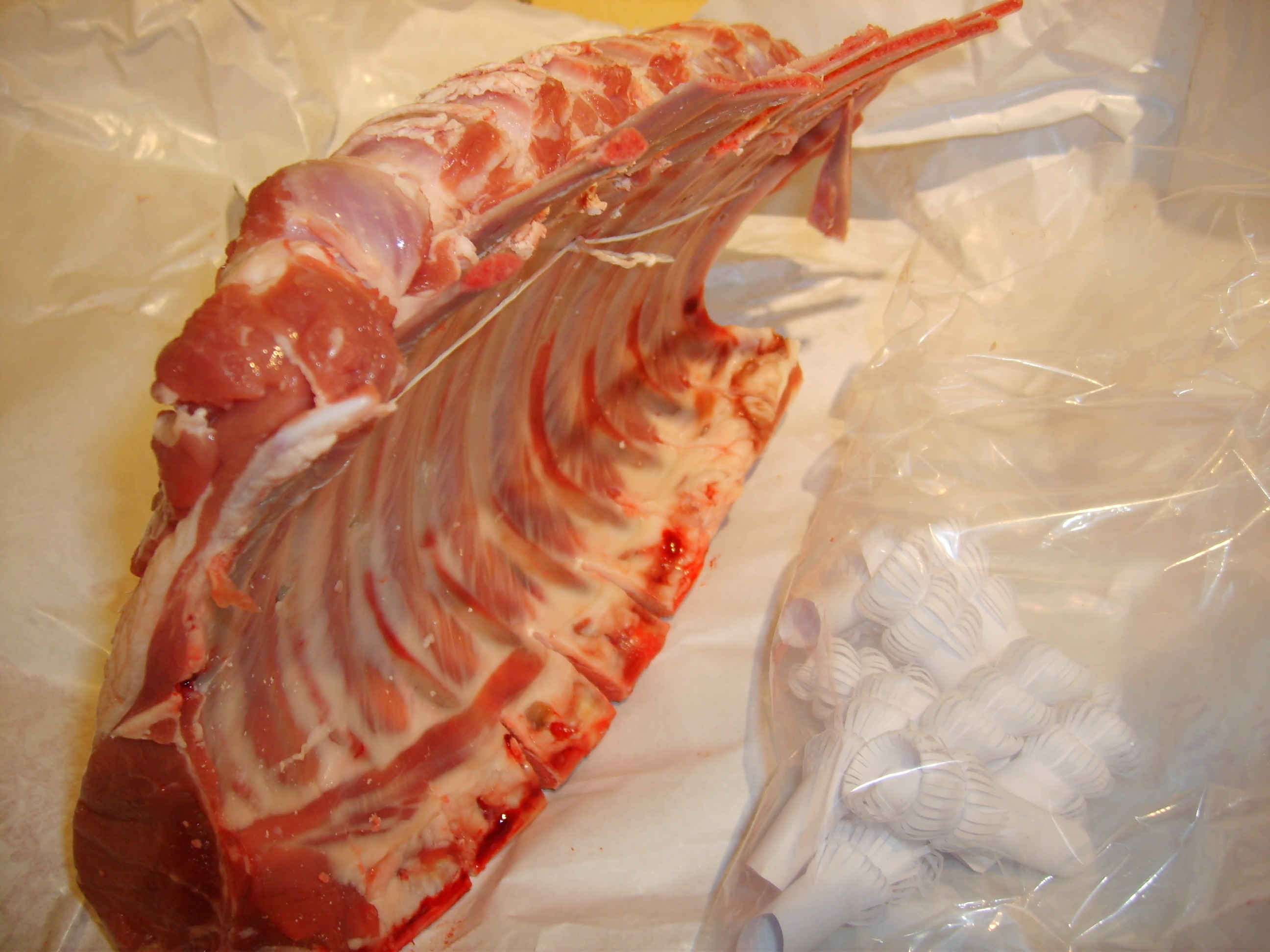
Rack of lamb (uncooked) with paper frills (manchettes) ready to be added after cooking.

A rack of lamb, also known as carré d'agneau (though this term may also refer to other cuts) or best end, is a lamb cut that is perpendicular to the spine and includes 16 ribs or chops. In retail, it is commonly sold as a 'single' rack, which means it is sawn longitudinally and includes the eight ribs on one side only. However, it may also be sold as a "double rack of lamb," with ribs on both sides. Another presentation involves placing two French trimmed racks together with the ribs interlinked, which is often referred to as a "guard of honour".

Rack of lamb is typically roasted, sometimes with a coating of herbed breadcrumb persillade. To enhance the presentation, the tips of the bones are occasionally decorated with paper frills known as manchettes.

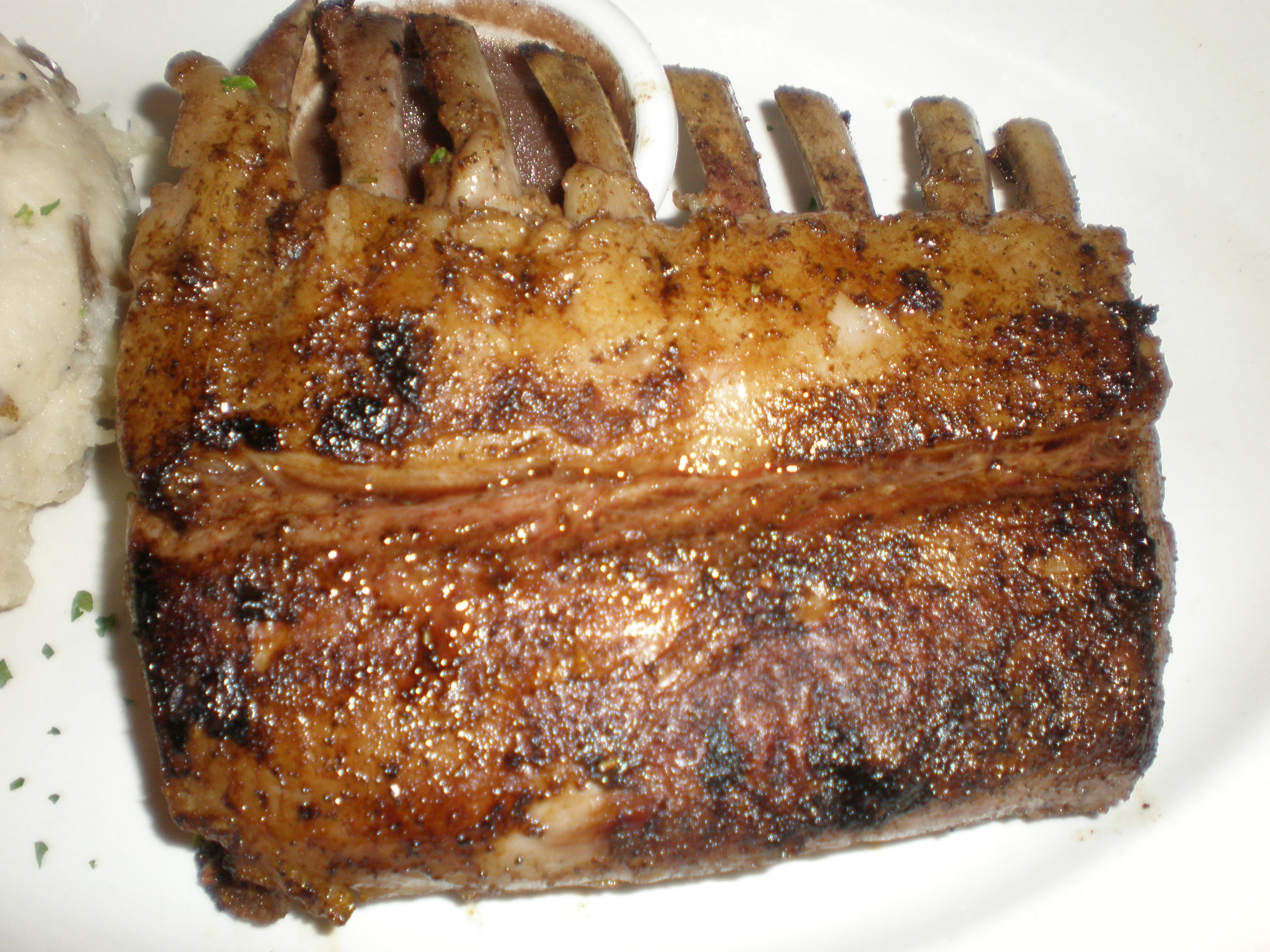
Roast rack of lamb

== Crown roast ==
Two or three single racks of lamb tied into a circle make a "crown roast of lamb". Crown roasts are sometimes cooked with (ground-lamb) stuffing in the middle.

== Frenching ==
Rack of lamb is often French trimmed (also known as Frenching in the United States), that is, the rib bones are exposed by cutting off the fat and meat covering them. Typically, three inches (7–8 cm) of bone beyond the main muscle (the rib eye or Longissimus dorsi) are left on the rack, with the top two inches (5 cm) exposed.

== See also ==
- List of lamb dishes
