= Manchette (cuisine) =

Paper frill attached to the exposed end of a bone of a cooked piece of meat

In cuisine a manchette is a paper frill attached to the exposed end of a bone of a cooked piece of meat.

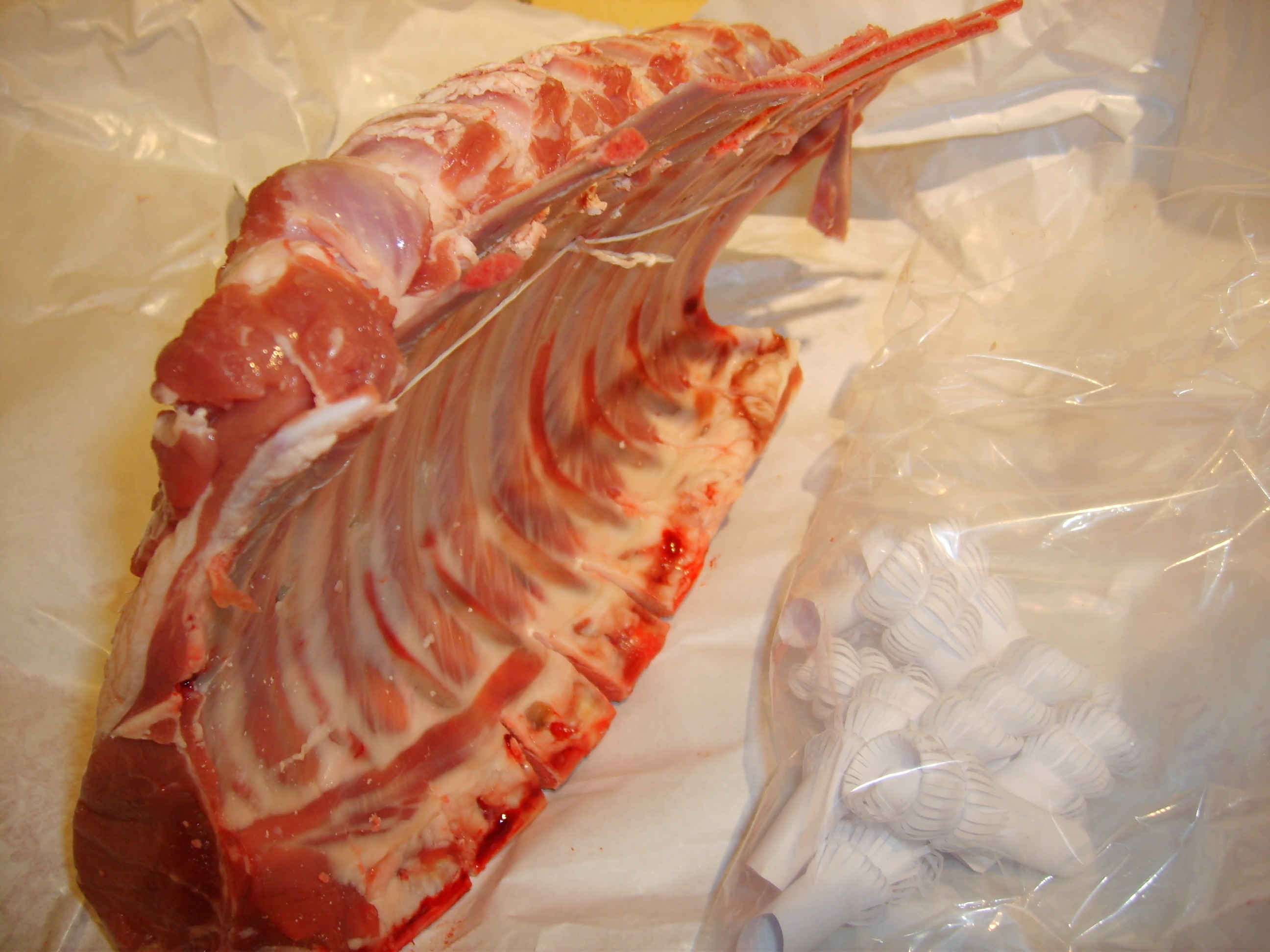
An uncooked rack of lamb with a packet of manchettes to its right

Manchettes are typically applied to the legs of roasted poultry and the bones of roasted pork or lamb. One particular dish often decorated with manchettes is the crown roast of lamb or pork.

Manchettes were originally of practical use: they allowed a cut of meat to be held with one hand securely and without the hand becoming greasy, leaving the other hand free to carve meat from the bone.
