= Matignon (cooking) =

Cooked vegetable mixture

In cooking, a matignon is a mirepoix in which the ingredients are minced rather than diced, and more flavorings added. Matignon, unlike mirepoix, is not a part of the food preparation itself, but is always served at the table.

== Ingredients ==
Matignon is a combination of evenly diced vegetables, usually onion (and/or leek), celery, and carrot, with thyme and bay leaf, sautéed in butter over a low flame until softened and translucent ("melted" but not browned), seasoned to taste with a pinch of salt (and a pinch of sugar, if needed), and finished with a dash of white wine or Madeira. The vegetarian version is referred to as maigre ("lean"). When ham or bacon is added, it is called gras ("fat," i.e., containing meat). Frequently the vegetables serve as a bed on which to cook meat, poultry, and fish dishes, or as a stuffing, but sometimes the matignon is served as a separate side dish in its own right.
