= Mirepoix =

Flavour base made of vegetables

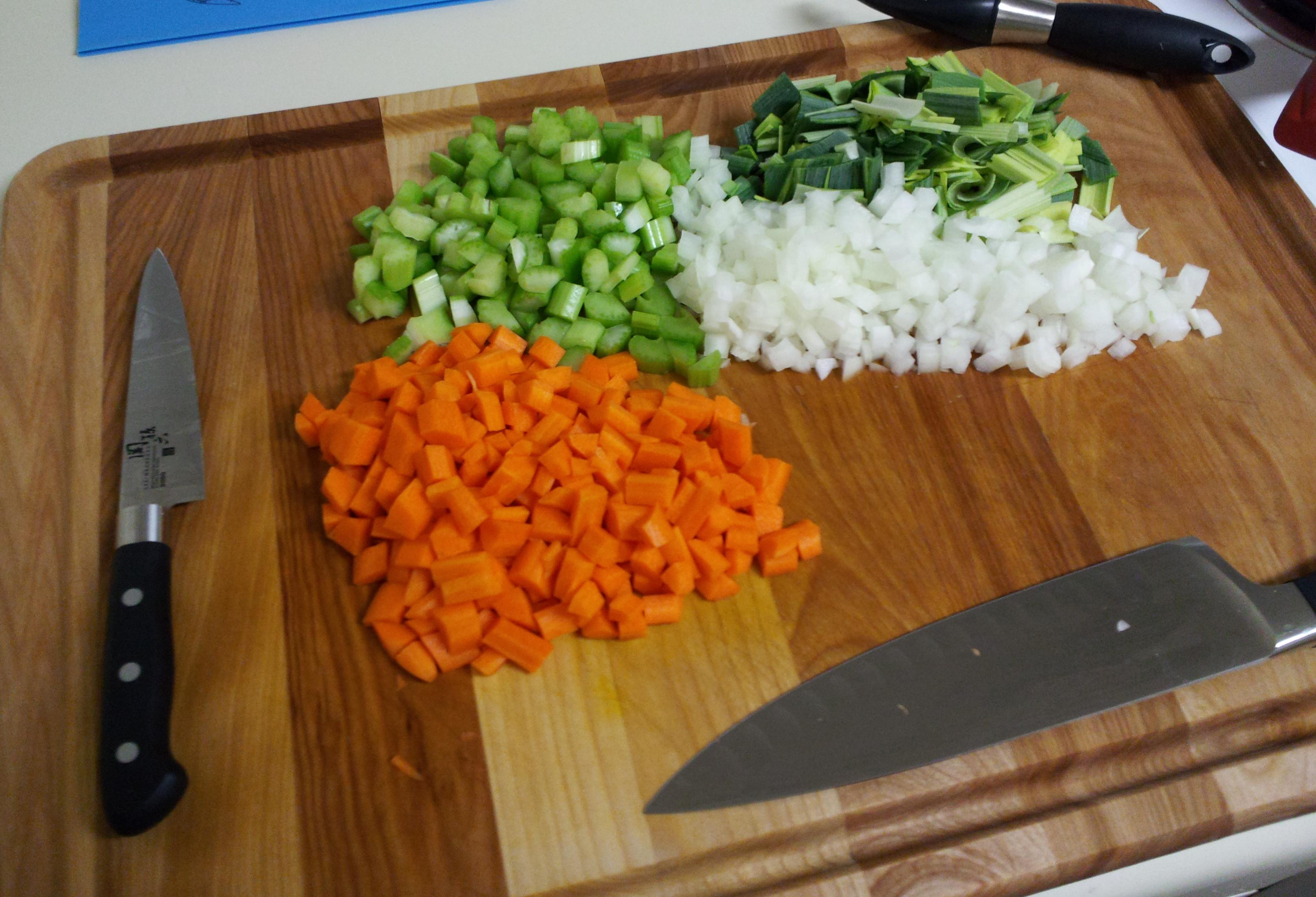
Vegetables prepared for mirepoix, on a cutting board. (Vegetables pictured, starting from bottom left and moving clockwise: carrots, celery, leeks, and onions.)

A mirepoix (/mɪərˈpwɑː/ meer-PWAH, French: [miʁ.pwa]) is a mixture of diced vegetables cooked with fat (usually butter) for a long time on low heat without colouring or browning. The ingredients are not sautéed or otherwise hard-cooked, because the intention is to sweeten rather than caramelise them. Historically including various meats before settling at its current meaning as a vegetable base, mirepoix is a long-standing part of French cuisine and is the flavour base for a wide variety of dishes, including stocks, soups, stews, and sauces.

When the mirepoix is not precooked, the constituent vegetables may be cut to a larger size, depending on the overall cooking time for the dish. Usually the vegetable mixture is onions, carrots, and celery (either common 'Pascal' celery or celeriac), with the traditional ratio being 2:1:1—two parts onion, one part carrot, and one part celery. Further cooking, with the addition of tomato purée, creates a darkened brown mixture called pinçage.

Similar flavour bases include the Italian soffritto, the Spanish and Portuguese sofrito/refogado (braised onions, garlic and tomato), a variation with tomato paste instead of fresh tomato of the Eastern Mediterranean and Balkans region, the German Suppengrün (leeks, carrots and celeriac), the Polish włoszczyzna (leeks, carrots, celeriac and parsley root), the Russian/Ukrainian smazhennya or zazharka (onion, carrot and possibly celery, beets or pepper), the United States Cajun/Creole holy trinity (onions, celery and bell peppers), and possibly the French duxelles (mushrooms and often onion or shallot and herbs, reduced to a paste).

Similar vegetable trios exist in Cantonese cuisine (scallions, ginger, and garlic) and South Asian cuisine (onions, garlic, chilis, and sometimes ginger).

== History ==
Although the cooking technique is probably older, the word mirepoix dates from the 18th century and derives, as do many other appellations in French cuisine, from the aristocratic employer of the cook credited with establishing and stabilizing it: in this case, Charles-Pierre-Gaston François de Lévis, duc de Lévis-Mirepoix (1699–1757), French field marshal and ambassador and a member of the noble family of Lévis, lords of Mirepoix, Ariège in Languedoc (nowadays in the department of Ariège) since the 11th century. According to Pierre Larousse (quoted in The Oxford Companion to Food), the Duke of Mirepoix was "an incompetent and mediocre individual ... who owed his vast fortune to the affection Louis XV felt toward his wife and who had but one claim to fame: he gave his name to a sauce made of all kinds of meat and a variety of seasonings".

The term was not encountered regularly in French culinary texts until the 19th century, so it is difficult to know what a dish à la mirepoix was like in 18th century France. Antoine Beauvilliers, for instance, in 1814, gives a short recipe for a Sauce à la Mirepoix which is a buttery, wine-laced stock garnished with an aromatic mixture of carrots, onions, and a bouquet garni. Marie-Antoine Carême, in 1816, gives a similar recipe, calling it simply "Mire-poix". By the mid-19th century, Jules Gouffé refers to mirepoix as "a term in use for such a long time that I do not hesitate to use it here". His mirepoix is listed among essences and, indeed, is a meaty concoction (laced with two bottles of Madeira), which, like all other essences, was used to enrich many a classic sauce. By the end of the 19th century, the mirepoix had begun to take on its modern meaning, although it still regularly included meat. Joseph Favre, in his Dictionnaire universel de cuisine (c. 1895, reprinted 1978), uses the term to describe a mixture of ham, carrots, onions, and herbs used as an aromatic condiment when making sauces or braising meat. The matignon is very similar to the mirepoix, except that the matignon is designed to be brought to the table and eaten with the dish or alone as a side dish.

According to the 1938 Larousse Gastronomique, a mirepoix may be prepared au gras (with meat) or au maigre (without meat). Mirepoix au maigre is sometimes called a brunoise (although strictly speaking this term more accurately merely designates the technique of dicing with a knife). A mirepoix au gras contains diced ham or pork belly as an additional ingredient. Similar combinations, both in and out of the French culinary repertoire, may include leeks, parsnips, garlic, tomatoes, shallots, mushrooms, bell peppers, chilies, and ginger, according to the requirements of the regional cuisine or the instructions of the particular chef or recipe. The analogous soffritto (frequently containing parsley) is the basis for many traditional dishes in classic Italian cuisine, and the sofrito serves a similar purpose in Spanish cuisines.

Traditionally, the weight ratio for mirepoix is 2:1:1 of onions, celery, and carrots; the ratio for bones to mirepoix for stock is 10:1. When making a white stock, or fond blanc, parsnips are used instead of carrots to maintain the pale colour.

== International versions ==
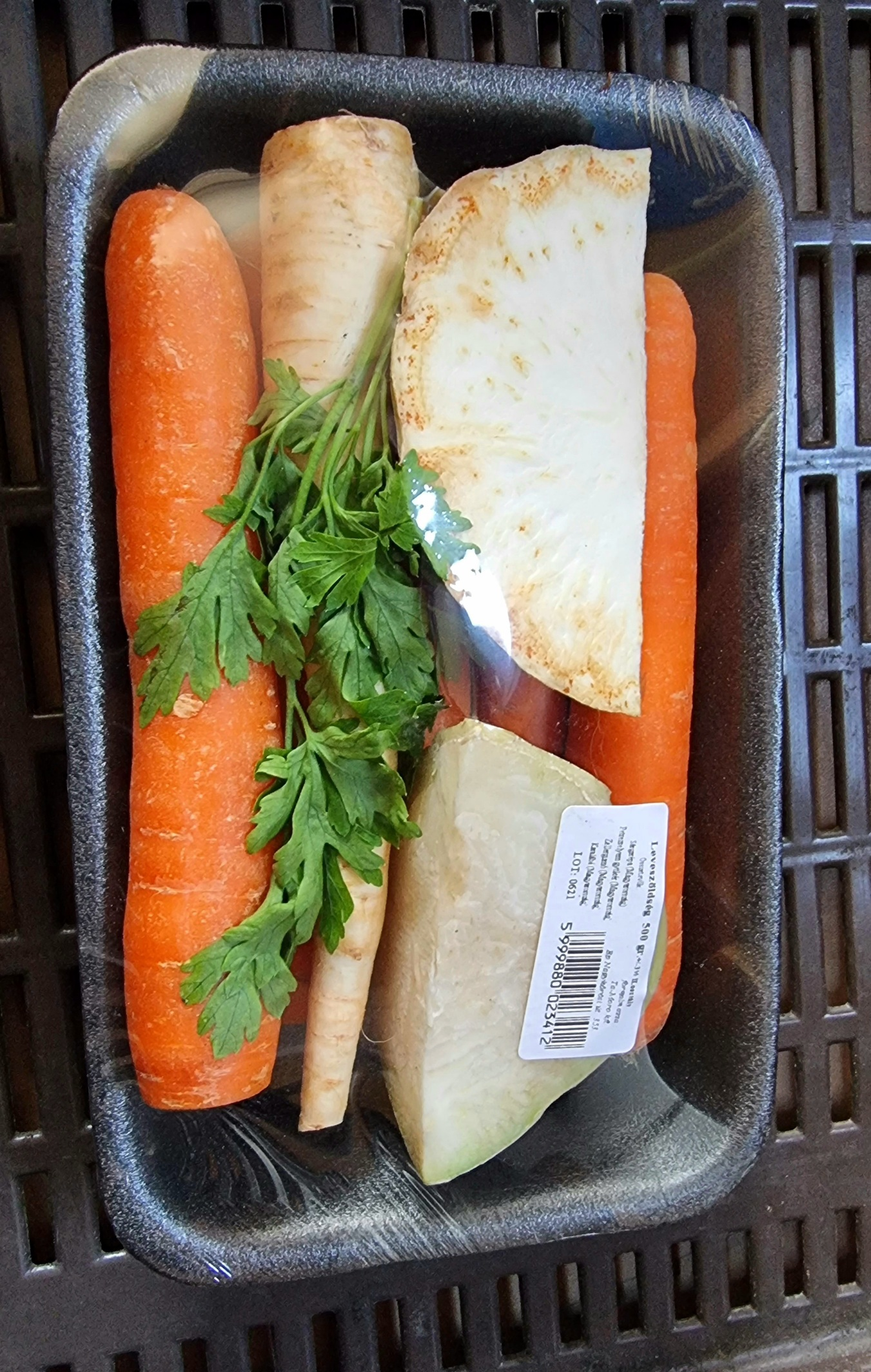
Prepackaged Hungarian leveszöldség ("soup vegetables"): carrot, parsley, parsley root, celeriac

=== German Suppengrün ===
Suppengrün ([ˈzʊpm̩ˌɡʁyːn]) means 'soup greens' in German; the Dutch equivalent is soepgroente. Soup greens usually come in a bundle and consists of a leek, a carrot, and a piece of celeriac. It may also contain parsley, thyme, celery leaves, rutabaga (swede), parsley root, and onions. The mix depends on regional traditions, as well as individual recipes. The vegetables used are cold-climate roots and bulbs with long shelf lives. Suppengrün act as herbs and impart hearty, strong flavours to the soup or sauce, providing a foil for other strong tasting ingredients such as dried peas and beans or pot roast. Large chunks of vegetables are slow cooked to make flavourful soups and stocks, and are discarded when the vegetables have given up most of their flavour. Finely chopped suppengrün are browned in fat and used as a basis for a finished sauce. The vegetables may also be cooked long enough until they fall apart, and may become part of the sauce or pureed to form the sauce.

=== Italian soffritto ===
In Italian cuisine, onions, carrots and celery are chopped to form a battuto, and then slowly cooked in butter or olive oil, becoming soffritto. It is used as the base for many pasta sauces, such as ragù (ragoût), but occasionally it can be used as the base of other dishes, such as sauteed vegetables. For this reason, it is a fundamental component in Italian cuisine. It may also contain garlic, shallot, or leek.

According to the Italian restaurateur Benedetta Vitali, soffritto means 'underfried' and is "a preparation of lightly browned minced vegetables, not a dish by itself". At one time it was called "false ragoût", because soffritto was thought to vaguely recall the flavour of meat sauce.

=== Polish włoszczyzna ===
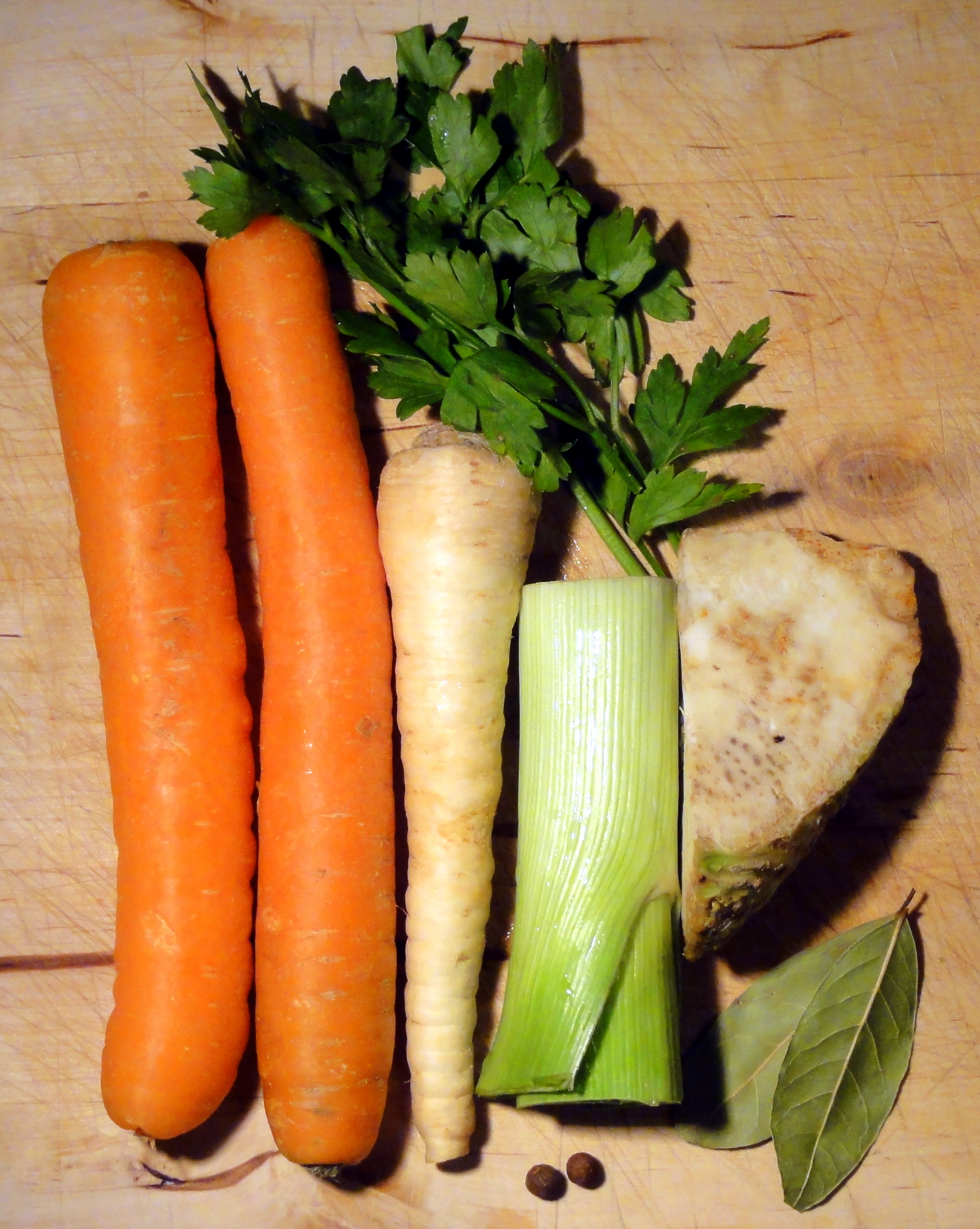
A typical set of soup greens, known as włoszczyzna, used in Polish cuisine: carrots, parsley root and leaves, leek, and celeriac. Bay leaves and allspice grains are also shown.

Włoszczyzna ([vwɔʂˈt͡ʂɨzna]) is the Polish word for soup vegetables or greens. The word literally means 'Italian stuff' because Queen Bona Sforza, who was Italian and married Polish King Sigismund I the Old in 1518, introduced this concept to Polish cuisine. A włoszczyzna may consist of carrots, parsnips or parsley root, celery root or celeriac, leeks, and savoy or white cabbage leaves, and sometimes celery leaves and flat-leaf parsley. The most typical, packaged combination is celery root, parsley root, carrots, and leeks. Włoszczyzna is usually cut up to uniform size and boiled to form a flavor base for soups and stews.

== See also ==
- Epis
- Holy trinity (cooking)
