= Muskmelon =

Muskmelon may refer to:

- True melon (Cucumis melo)
- American cantaloupe (Cucumis melo Reticulatus Group)
