= Higo Green melon =

Japanese variety of melon

Higo Green
- Species: Cucumis melo
- Origin: Japan

The Higo Green melon (肥後グリーンメロン, Higō Gurīn Meron) is a Japanese variety of melon known for its delicate floral flavor and sweet yet refreshing flesh. It originated in Kumamoto prefecture, Japan. It was developed by Matsui Seed Co. in the Nara Prefecture around 1989.

It is a prized fruit in Japan, often considered a luxury item due to its limited availability and high quality.

== Characteristics ==
Higo Green melons are typically round or oval-shaped with a dark green rind covered in a fine network of brown lines. The flesh is a pale green color and is characterized by its firm, crisp texture and high sugar content.

== Cultivation ==
Higo Green Melons are primarily cultivated in the Kumamoto Prefecture of Japan. They are grown in greenhouses or under protective netting to ensure optimal growing conditions and to protect the fruit from pests and diseases. The cultivation process is labor-intensive, requiring careful attention to detail to produce high-quality melons.

Higo green melons are susceptible to Fusarium.
