= Wolgwa-chae =

Korean stir-fried vegetable dish

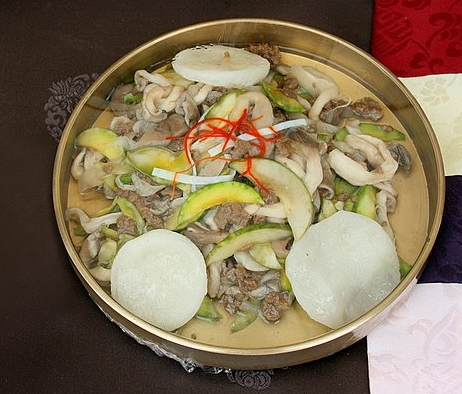
- Wolgwa-chae topped with chili threads and egg garnish
- Type: Japchae
- Place of origin: Korea
- Associated cuisine: Korean cuisine
- Serving temperature: Warm
- Main ingredients: Oriental pickling melon, beef, mushrooms, bukkumi, vegetables

Korean name
- Hangul: 월과채
- Hanja: 越瓜菜
- RR: wolgwachae
- MR: wŏlgwach'ae
- IPA: [wʌl.ɡwa.tɕʰɛ]

Wolgwa-chae (Korean: 월과채; Hanja: 越瓜菜) is a variety of japchae (stir-fried vegetable dish) made with Oriental pickling melon, called wolgwa in Korean. This summer dish was a part of the Korean royal court cuisine.

== Ingredients and preparation ==
In modern South Korea, aehobak has largely replaced Oriental pickling melon for making the dish, due to the latter vegetable's rarity. Sometimes, cucumber or eggplant are used instead. Other common ingredients include beef, shiitake or oyster mushrooms, and chapssal-bukkumi (pan-fried glutinous rice cake). When wolgwa-chae is served in school meals, beef is often replaced with pork and bukkumi with tteokmyeon (rice cake noodles).

To make the dish, the melon or replacement vegetable is seeded, thinly sliced, lightly salted, and squeeze-drained to remove moisture. Beef, mushrooms, and other vegetables are julienned, and each of the ingredients is separately seasoned and stir-fried. Aromatics such as scallions and garlic may be added when stir-frying the ingredients. Thin bukkumi, made with glutinous rice flour into circles around 4–5 cm (1.6–2.0 in) in diameter, may be used either whole or julienned. Stir-fried ingredients are mixed together with sesame oil, ground black pepper, and crushed toasted sesame seeds. When served, the dish may be topped with crushed pine nuts, chili threads, and egg garnish.

== See also ==
- Japchae
- Tangpyeong-chae
- List of melon dishes
