= Oriental pickling melon =

Group of nonsweet melon cultivars

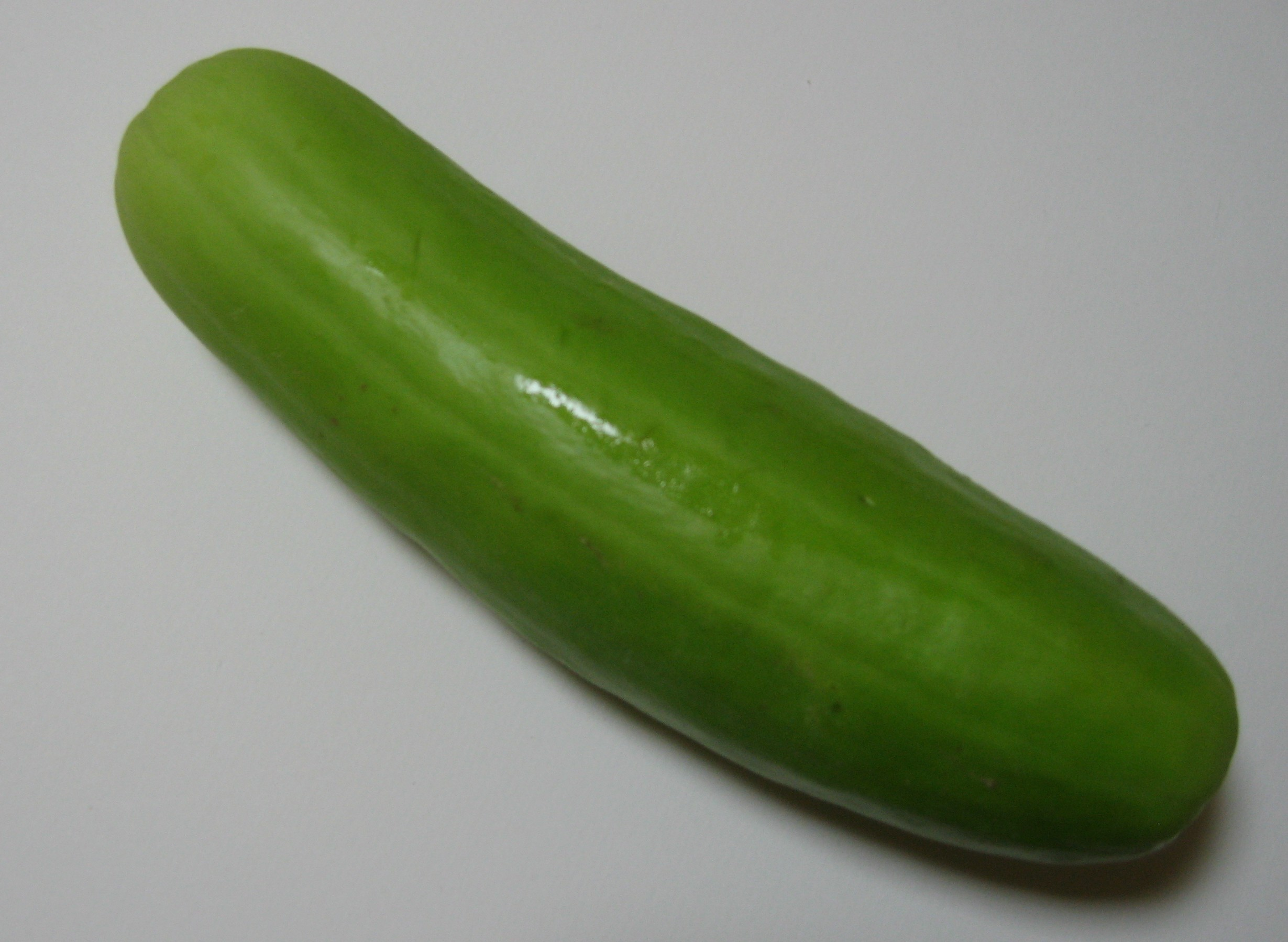
- Genus: Cucumis
- Species: C. melo
- Cultivar group: Conomon Group
- Cultivar: Oriental pickling melon

Oriental pickling melon, called wolgwa (월과; 越瓜) in Korean, and shirouri (シロウリ; 白瓜) in Japanese, is a group of nonsweet melon cultivars used in Asian cuisines.

== Use ==
The melon is used as a vegetable in Asian cuisines.

=== Japan ===
In Japan, the melon is used in narazuke, a type of tsukemono.

=== Korea ===
In Korea, the melon is used as the main ingredient in wolgwa-chae, a type of japchae.

== See also ==
- Aehobak
