= Aehobak =

Edible summer squash commonly used in Korean cuisine

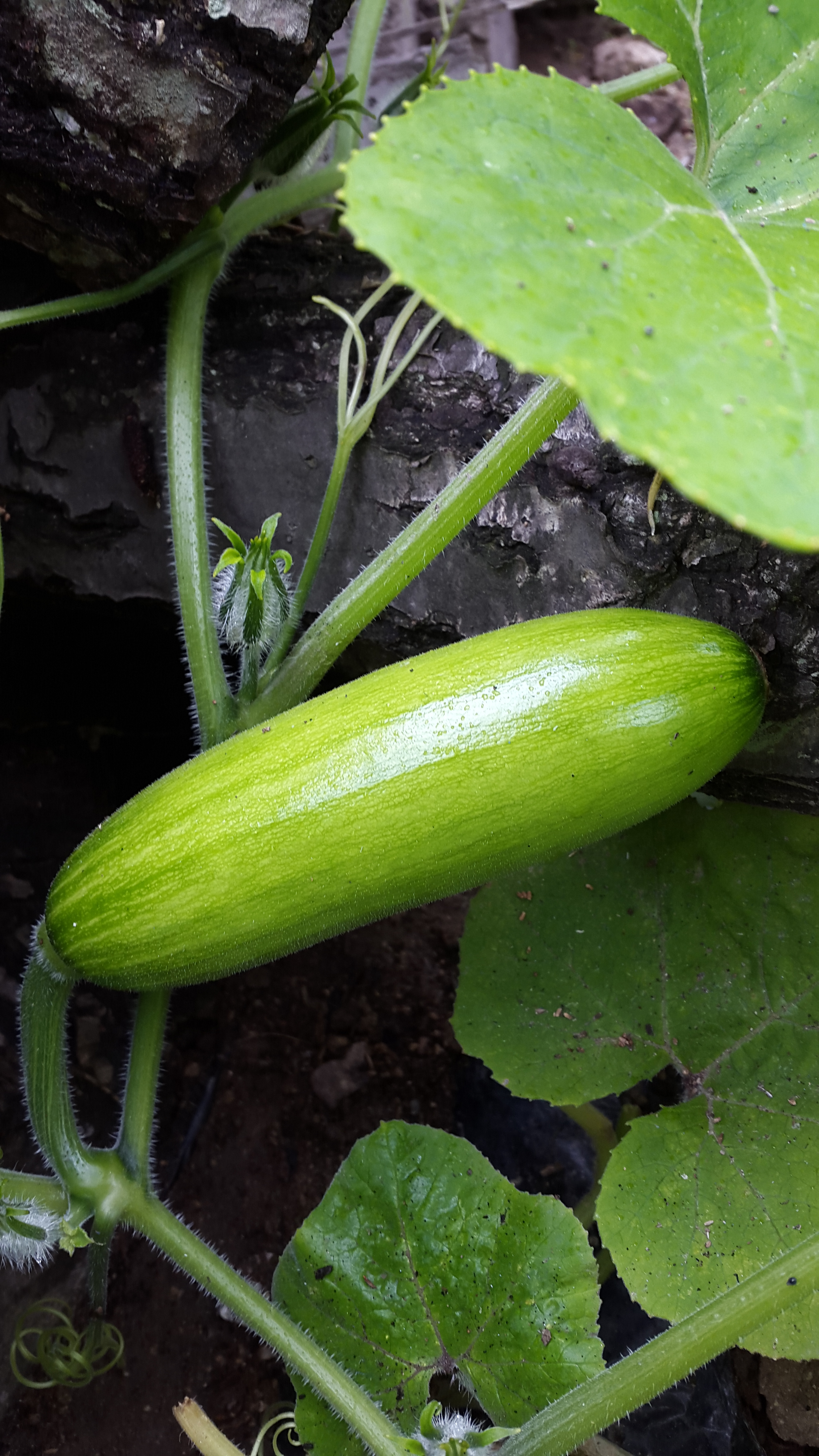
- Aehobak after rain
- Species: Cucurbita moschata
- Cultivar: Seoulmadi; Bulam-sacheol; Miso
- Origin: Korea

Korean name
- Hangul: 애호박
- RR: aehobak
- MR: aehobak
- IPA: ɛ.ɦo.bak̚

Aehobak (Korean: 애호박), also called Korean zucchini or Korean courgette, is an edible, green to yellow-green summer squash. Although nearly all summer squashes are varieties of Cucurbita pepo, aehobak belongs to the species Cucurbita moschata. Commonly used in Korean cuisine, an aehobak has the shape of zucchini, but with thinner, smoother skin, and more delicate flesh. It is usually sold in shrink-wrapped plastic.

Cultivars of Korean zucchini include 'Seoulmadi', 'Bulam-sacheol', and 'Miso'.

== Culinary use ==
In Korean cuisine, the squash is used either fresh or dried. Fresh aehobak can be pan-fried, either julienned in batter into buchimgae or sliced and egg-washed as jeon. It is often made into namul-banchan (seasoned vegetable side dish), usually seasoned with salted shrimp and stir-fried. Sometimes, aehobak features as the main ingredient in stew dishes such as jijimi and mureum. Dried aehobak, called hobak-goji, can be prepared by slicing the squash thinly and sun-drying the slices. It is soaked before cooking, then usually stir-fried to make a bokkeum or namul.

The squash is also used in royal court dishes such as seon, and more recently in wolgwa-chae, replacing the Oriental pickling melon.

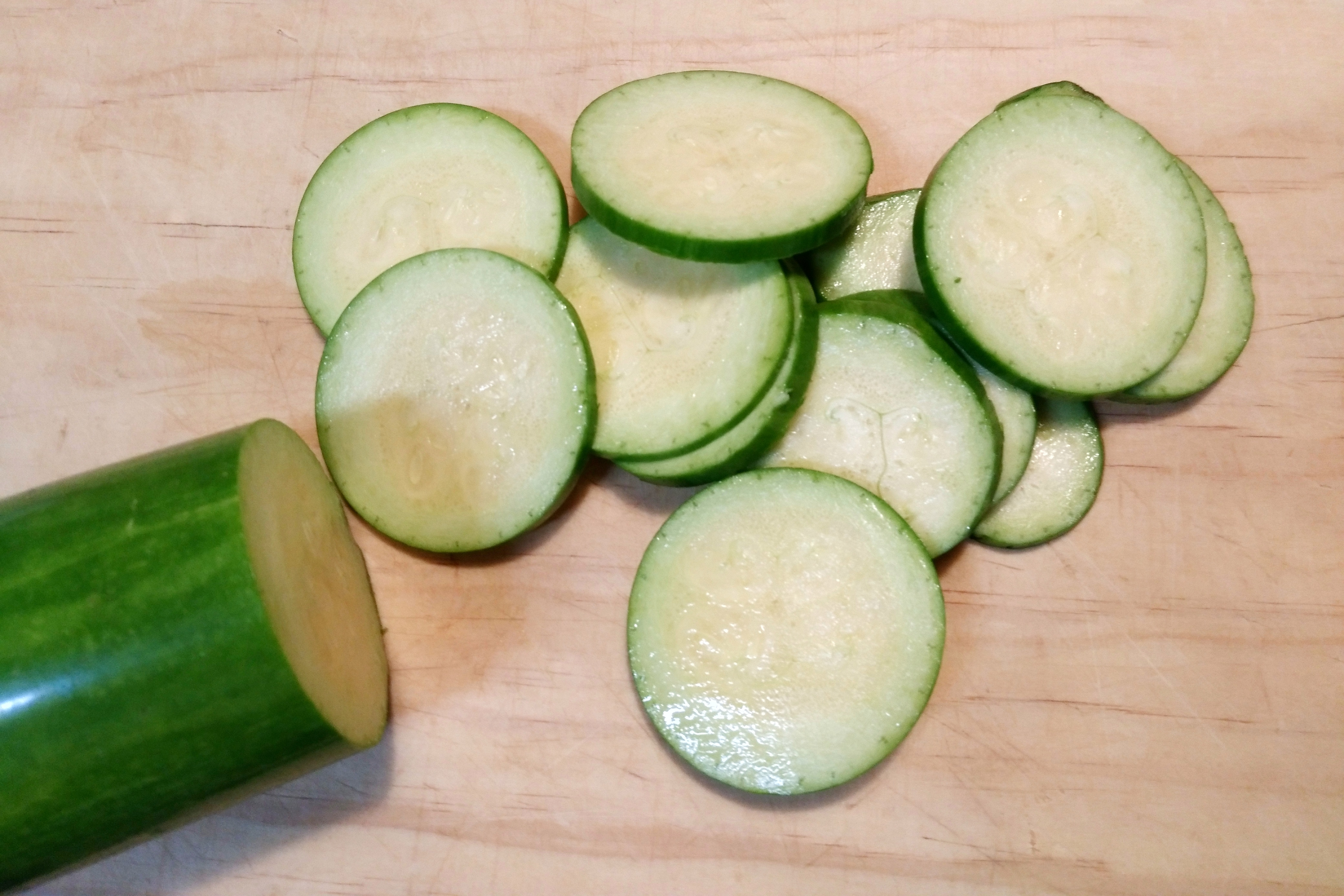
Sliced aehobak

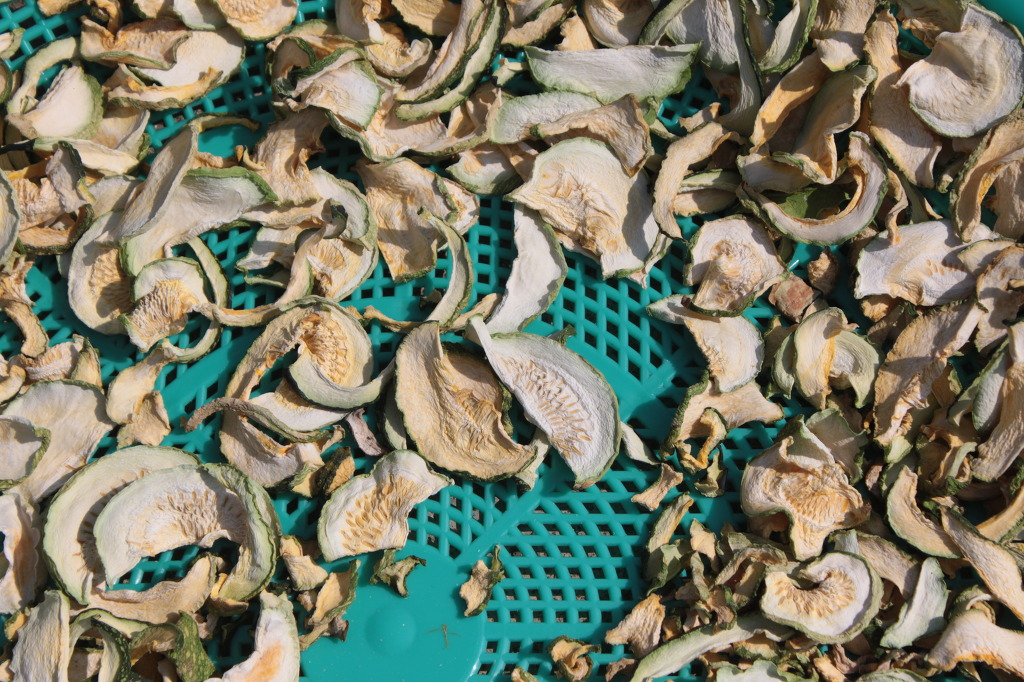
Hobak-goji (dried aehobak)

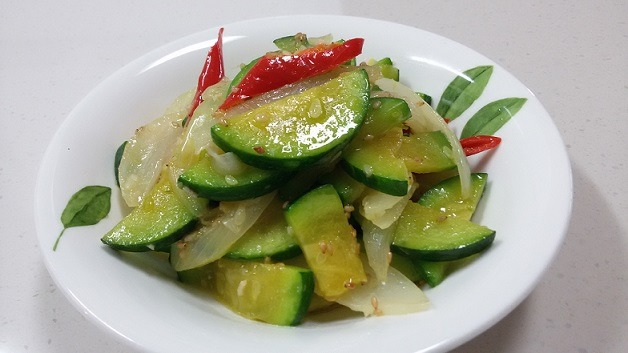
Aehobak-namul (stir-fried aehobak)

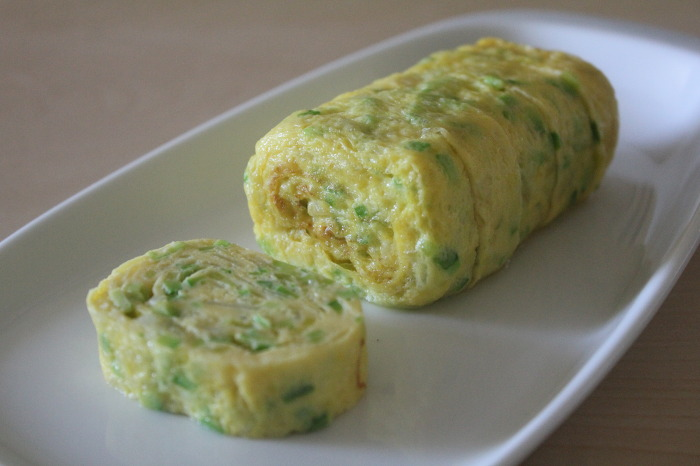
Aehobak-gyeran-mari (rolled aehobak omelettes)

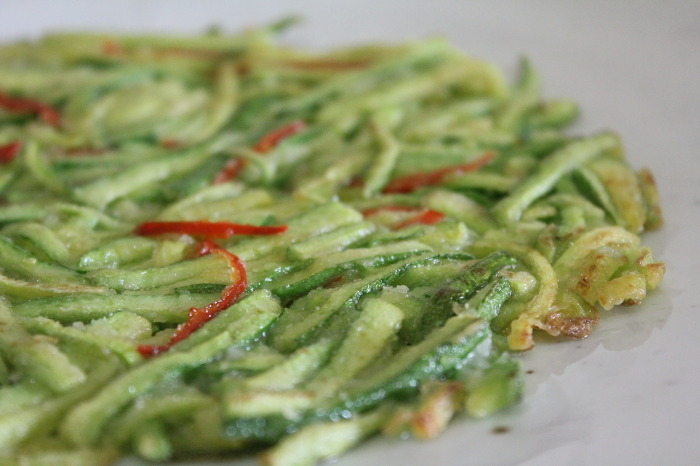
Aehobak-buchimgae (aehobak pancake)

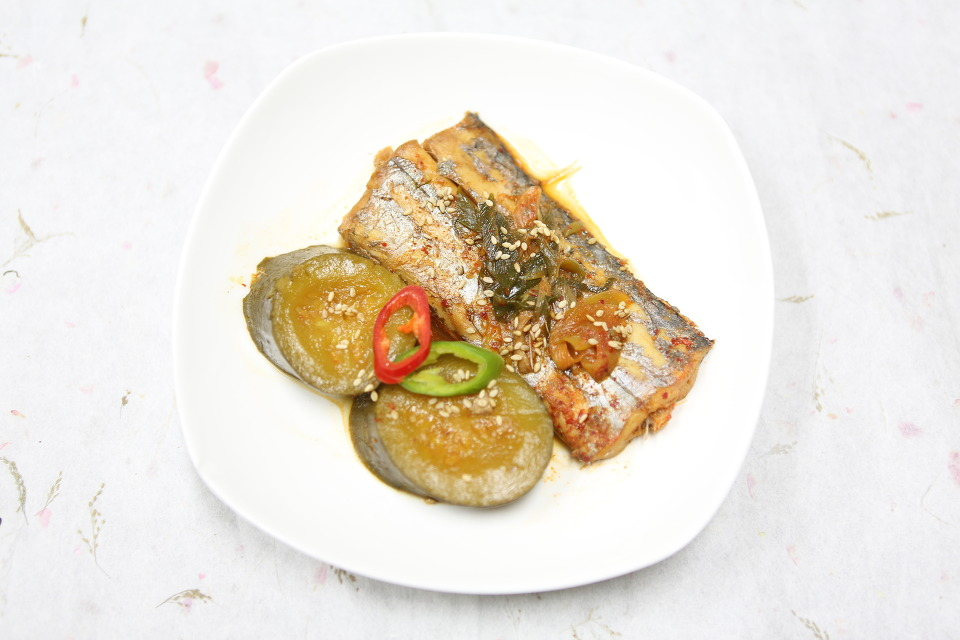
Galchi-aehobak-jorim (simmered hairtail and aehobak)

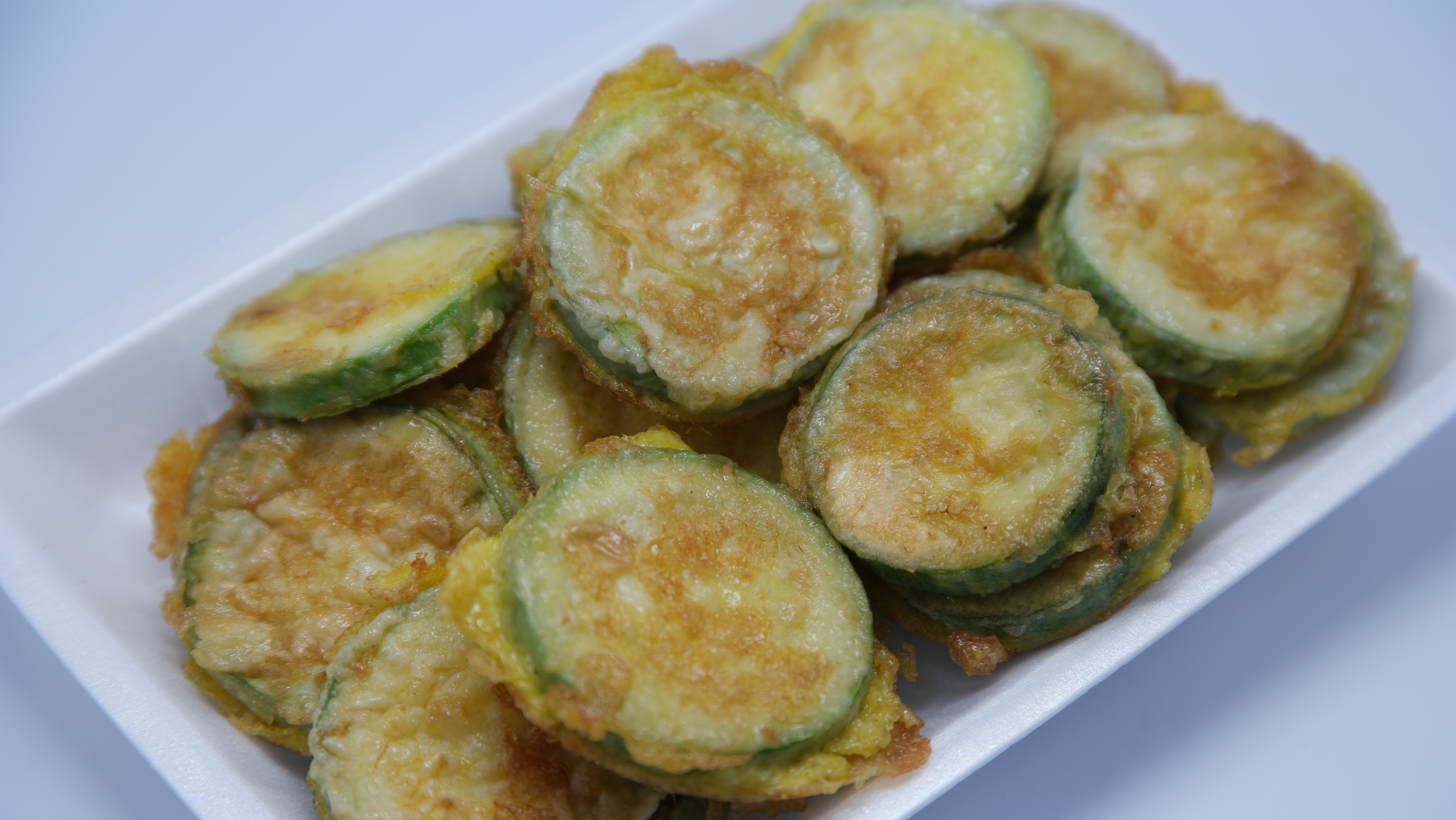
Hobak-jeon (pan-fried aehobak)

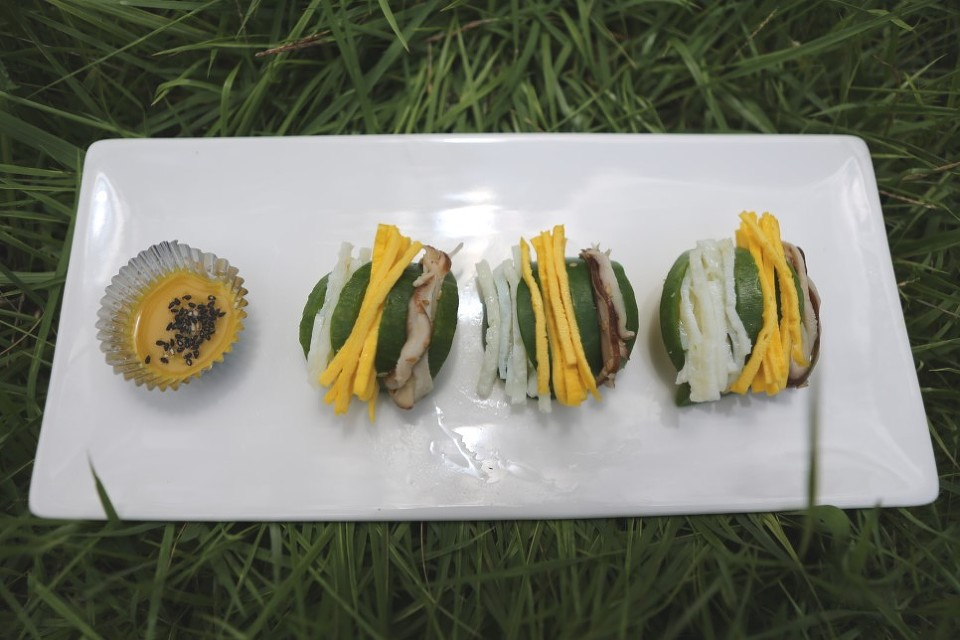
Hobak-seon (stuffed aehobak)

== See also ==
- Straightneck squash – Type of summer squash that is usually yellow-colored
- Tromboncino – Cultivar of Cucurbita moschata
