= Carosello (melon) =

Variety of muskmelon

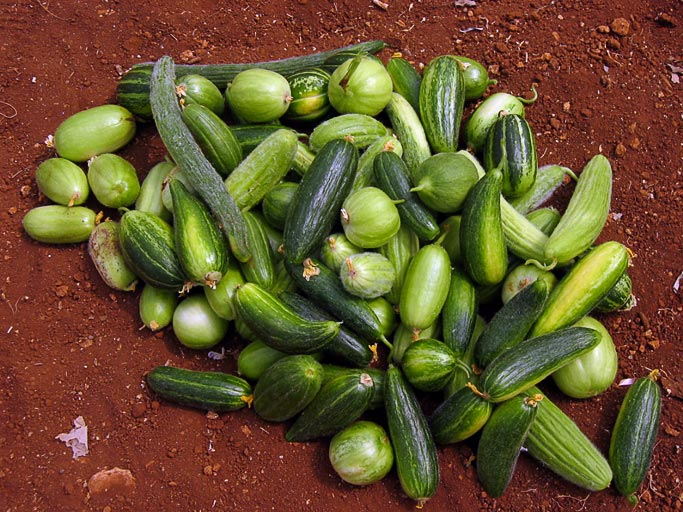
In this image, carosello are the elongated fruits, which are intermingled with round-shaped barattiere.

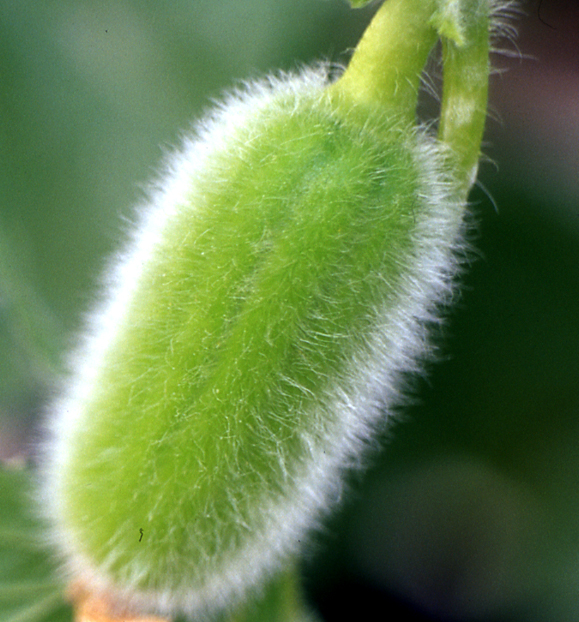
The fruit of carosello in development

The carosello is a landrace variety of melon (Cucumis melo) found in Southern Italy. It is common in the Apulia region of Italy.

== Varieties ==
Carosello barese is a rare heirloom variety of carosello. "Barese" means "from Bari", the major port city of Apulia.

Another variety is the Barattiere "Tondo Liscio" (rounded smooth) of Manduria, an Apulian city which was an ancient Messapian settlement.

== Uses ==
In Italian cuisine, carosello is used in the same manner as the cucumber. It is typically consumed in an immature, unripened state.

== See also ==
- Ark of Taste
- Barattiere – another landrace variety of muskmelon
