= Barattiere =

Variety of muskmelon

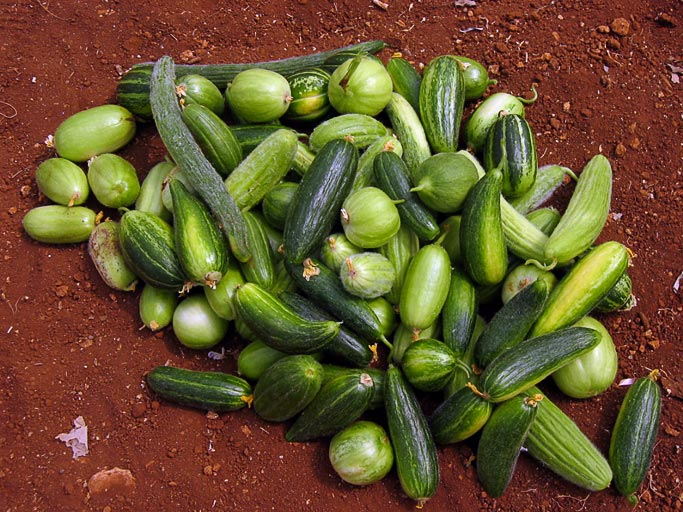
In this image, barattiere are the round-shaped fruits, which are intermingled with the long-shaped carosello.

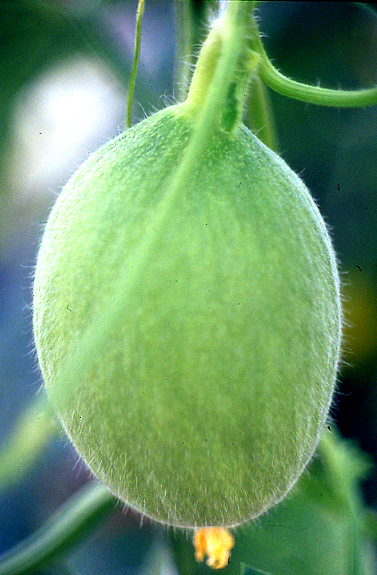
The fruit of barattiere in development

The barattiere is a landrace variety of melon (Cucumis melo) found in Southern Italy. It is common in the Apulia region of Italy and in the region of Sahel in Tunisia.

== Uses ==
In Italian cuisine, barattiere is typically consumed in an immature, unripened state. It is consumed in the same manner in Tunisia.

== See also ==
- Ark of Taste
- Carosello – another landrace variety of muskmelon
