= Japchae =

Korean stir-fried noodle dish

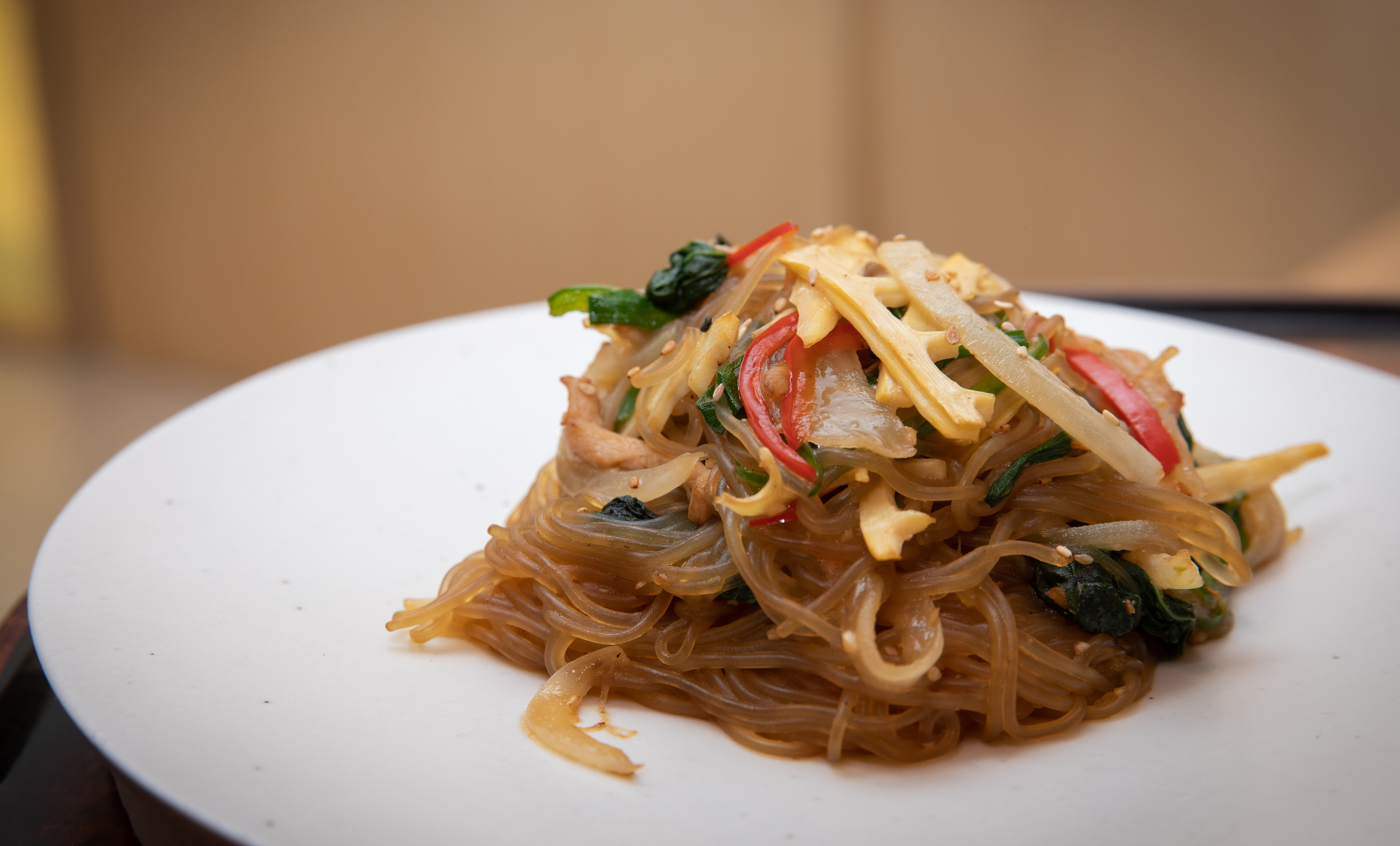
- Place of origin: Korea
- Associated cuisine: Korean cuisine
- Serving temperature: 50–65 °C (122–149 °F)
- Main ingredients: Sweet potato starch noodles

Korean name
- Hangul: 잡채
- Hanja: 雜菜
- RR: japchae
- MR: chapch'ae
- IPA: [tɕap̚.tɕʰɛ]

Japchae (Korean: 잡채; Hanja: 雜菜; IPA: [tɕap̚tɕʰɛ]) is a savory and slightly sweet dish of stir-fried glass noodles and vegetables that is popular in Korean cuisine. Japchae is typically prepared with dangmyeon (당면; 唐麵), a type of cellophane noodles made from sweet potato starch; the noodles are mixed with assorted vegetables, meat, and mushrooms, and seasoned with soy sauce and sesame oil.

Once a royal dish, japchae is now one of the most popular traditional celebration dishes, often served on special occasions, such as weddings, birthdays (especially dol, the first birthday, and hwangap, the sixtieth), and holidays. It is also popular at banquets, parties, and potlucks, due to the ease of bulk preparation and flexible serving: japchae can be served warm, at room temperature, or cold from the refrigerator, and can be eaten freshly made or the day after.

Japchae is commonly served as a banchan (side dish), though it may also be eaten as a main dish. It is sometimes served on a bed of rice: with rice, it is known as japchae-bap (잡채밥).

== Etymology and history ==
The Sino-Korean word japchae (잡채; 雜菜) consists of two syllables, jap (잡; 雜) meaning "mixed" and chae (채; 菜) meaning "vegetable".

According to Veritable Records of the Joseon Dynasty, the name originally referred to a stir-fried vegetable and mushroom dish, first made in the early 17th century by Yi Chung (1568‒1619) for King Gwanghaegun's palace banquet. The king liked the dish so much that he rewarded Yi by promoting him to a high-ranking position, equivalent to the position of Secretary of the Treasury, and japchae became a fixture of Korean royal court cuisine. Cooked without noodles or meat at the time, japchae was considered a luxurious and elegant dish served to the royal family and high-level officials. Cucumbers, radishes, and shiitake mushrooms were among the vegetables used in this period.

Japchae, like other royal dishes, was eventually adopted into the cuisine of common people. Its popularity increased later in the 20th century when cellophane noodles made from sweet potato starch were introduced to Korea from China. The noodles have since become an integral and primary ingredient of japchae. Beef and other meats have been added to the noodle dish, while experimentation and adaptations have led to many noodle-less variations made with seafood, herbs, peppers, bean sprouts, and other ingredients.

== Ingredients and preparation ==
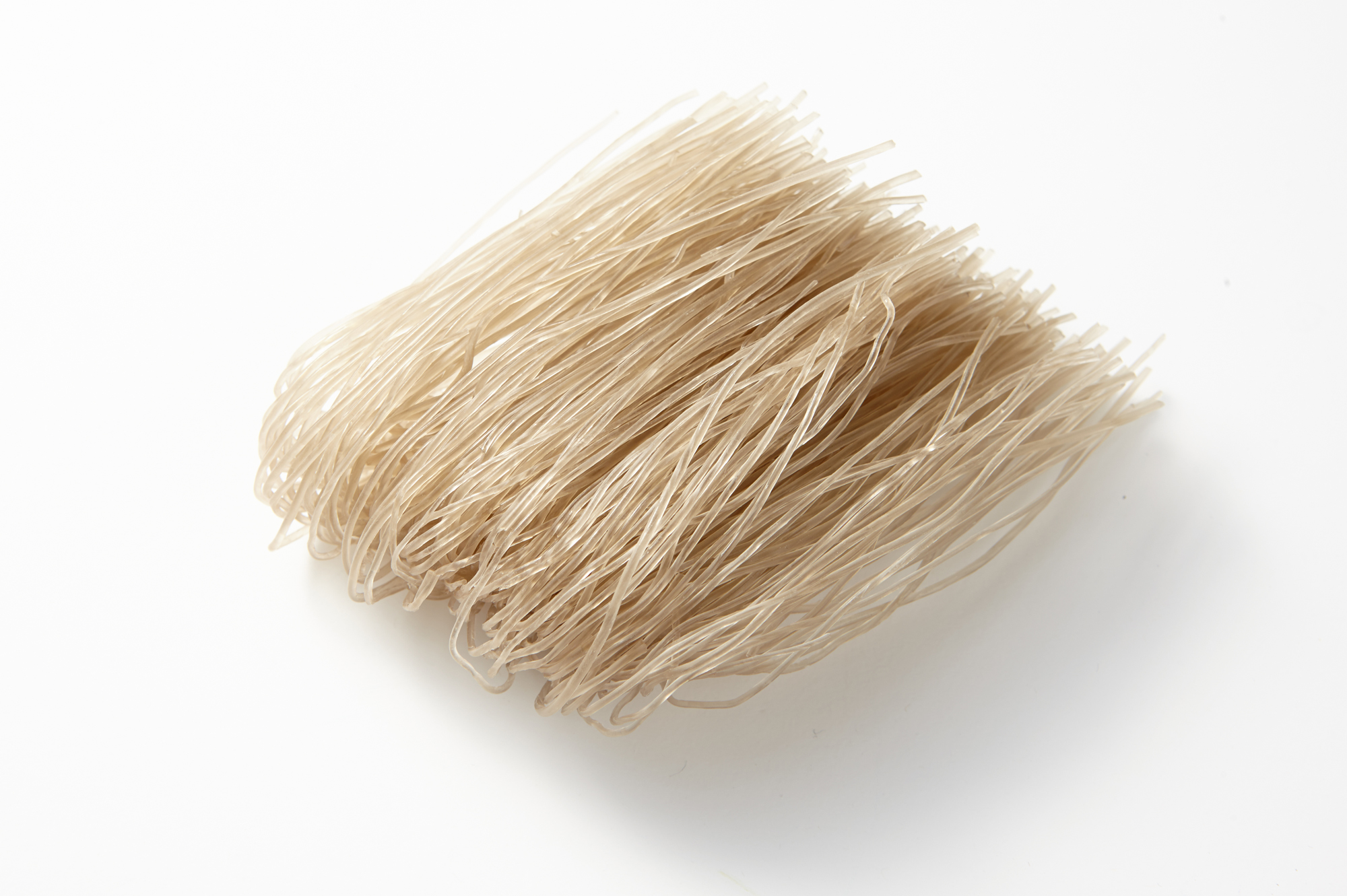
Dangmyeon

Dangmyeon are pale grey, semi-transparent, chewy and elastic noodles made from sweet potato starch. They are also known as "glass noodles", "cellophane noodles", or "sweet potato vermicelli". The noodles may be soaked in water before cooking. Noodles are sometimes soaked in hot water and then stir-fried. The assortment of vegetables in japchae may vary, with typical ingredients including mushrooms, carrots, spinach, onions, egg and scallions. Commonly used mushrooms are wood ear, shiitake, and oyster mushrooms. Both beef and pork are commonly used for japchae. Each ingredient is stir-fried separately before being mixed with boiled and drained noodles, and seasoned with soy sauce, sugar, chopped garlic, green onions and sesame oil. The dish is usually garnished with toasted sesame seeds and chili threads, and served hot or cold.

== Varieties ==
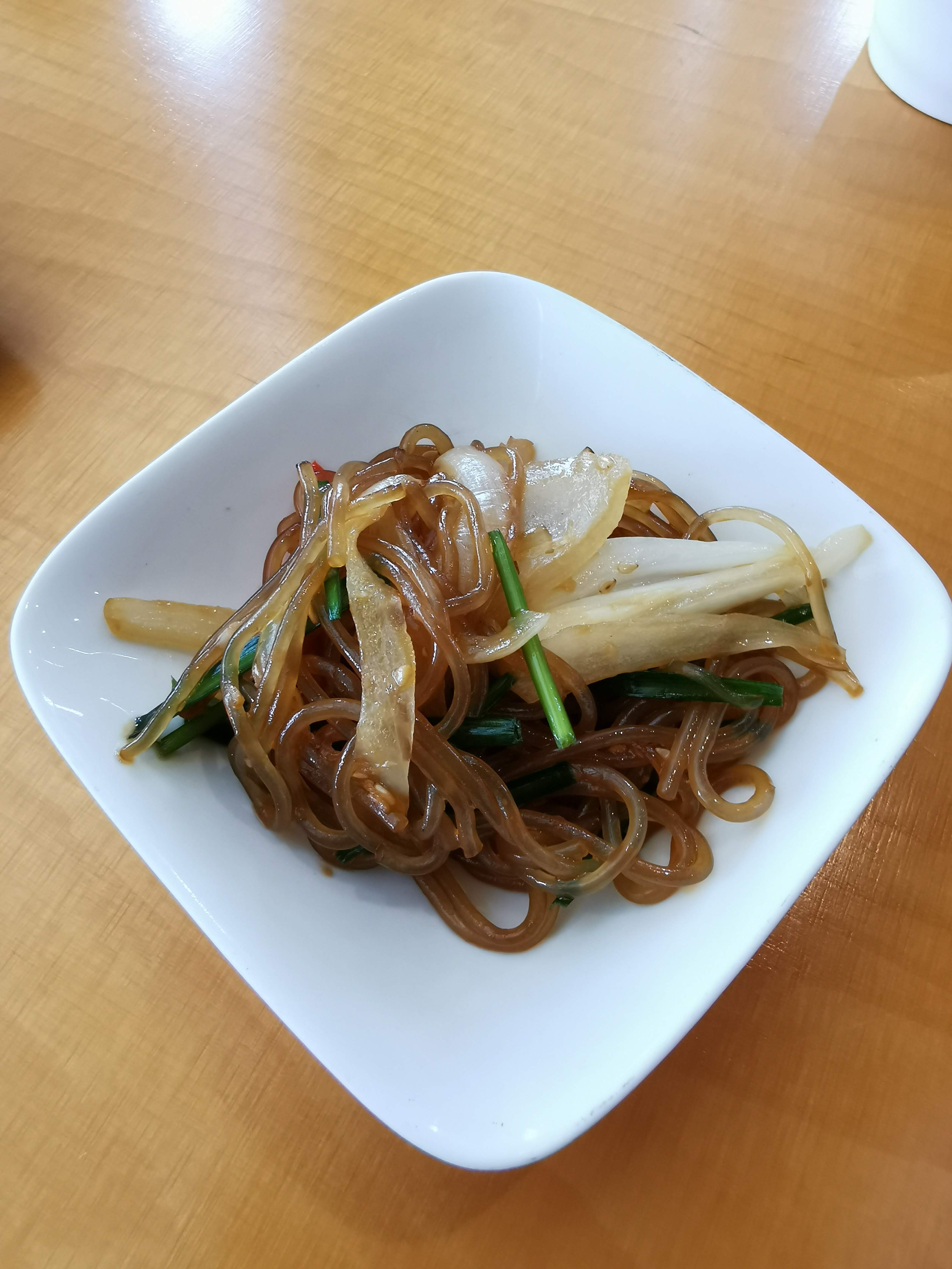
Korean japchae

=== Royal court dishes ===
- Gyeoja-chae (겨자채)
- Jokchae (족채) – made with shredded jokpyeon (trotter jelly) and vegetables
- Tangpyeong-chae (탕평채) – made with nokdu-muk (mung bean jelly), beef, mung bean sprouts, water dropwort, and mugwort
- Wolgwa-chae (월과채) – made with Oriental pickling melon, beef, and vegetables
- Juksoon-chae (죽순채) - made with bamboo shoots and vegetables

=== Other dishes ===
- Gochu-japchae (고추잡채) – made with shredded green pepper and vegetables
- Buchu-japchae (부추잡채) – made with garlic chives
- Kongnamul-japchae (콩나물잡채) – made with soybean sprouts
- Haemul-japchae (해물잡채) – made with seafood and vegetables
- Beoseot-japchae (버섯잡채) – made with mushrooms
- Gungjung-japchae (궁중잡채) – made with high-grade ingredients and royal vegetables

== See also ==
- Funchoza
- List of sweet potato dishes
