= Gyeran-mari =

Korean rolled egg dish

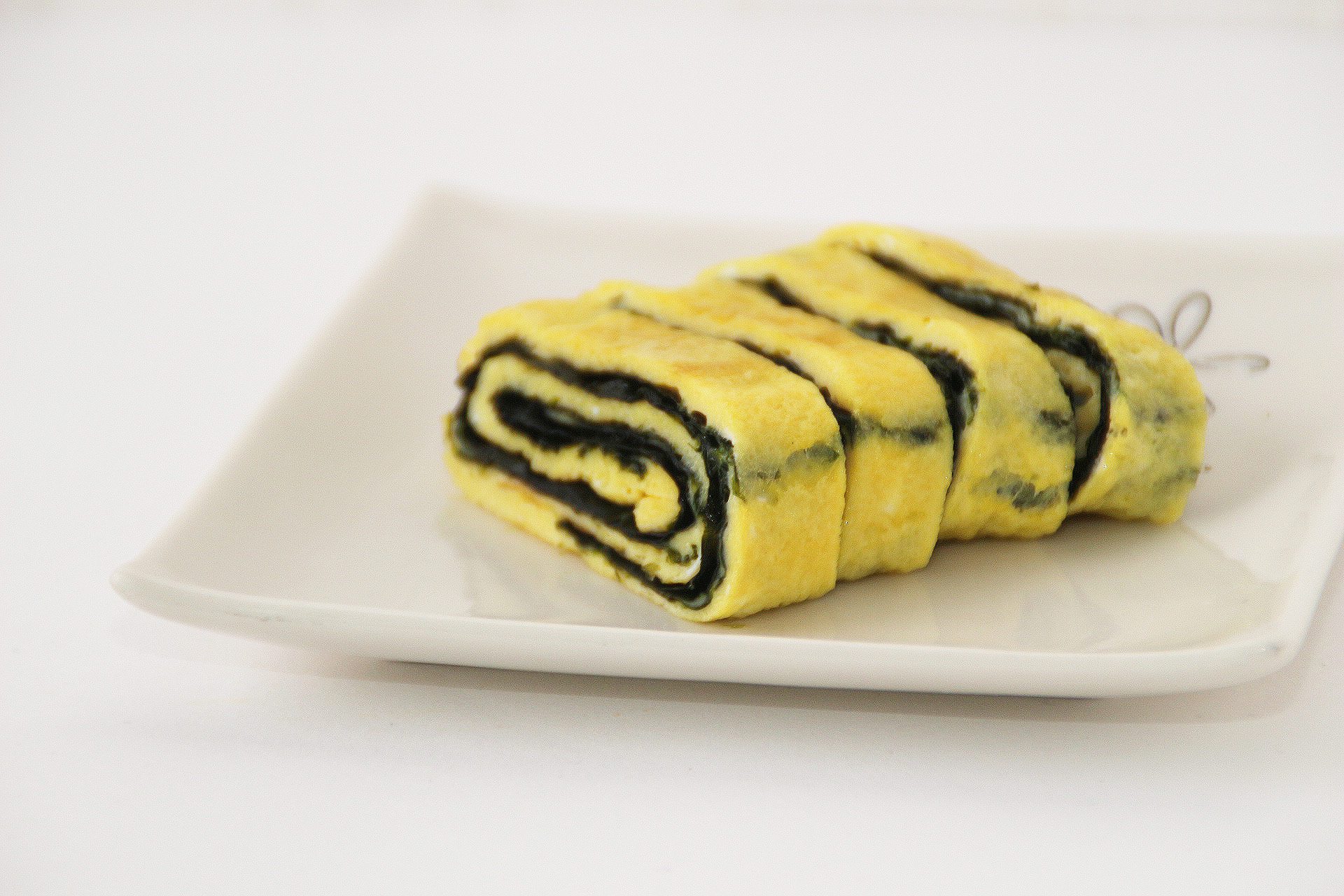
- Gim-gyeran-mari (rolled omelette with gim)
- Alternative names: Rolled omelette
- Type: Omelette
- Course: Banchan
- Place of origin: Korea
- Main ingredients: Eggs
- Similar dishes: Tamagoyaki

Korean name
- Hangul: 계란말이
- Hanja: 鷄卵말이
- RR: gyeranmari
- MR: kyeranmari
- IPA: [kje.ɾan.ma.ɾi]

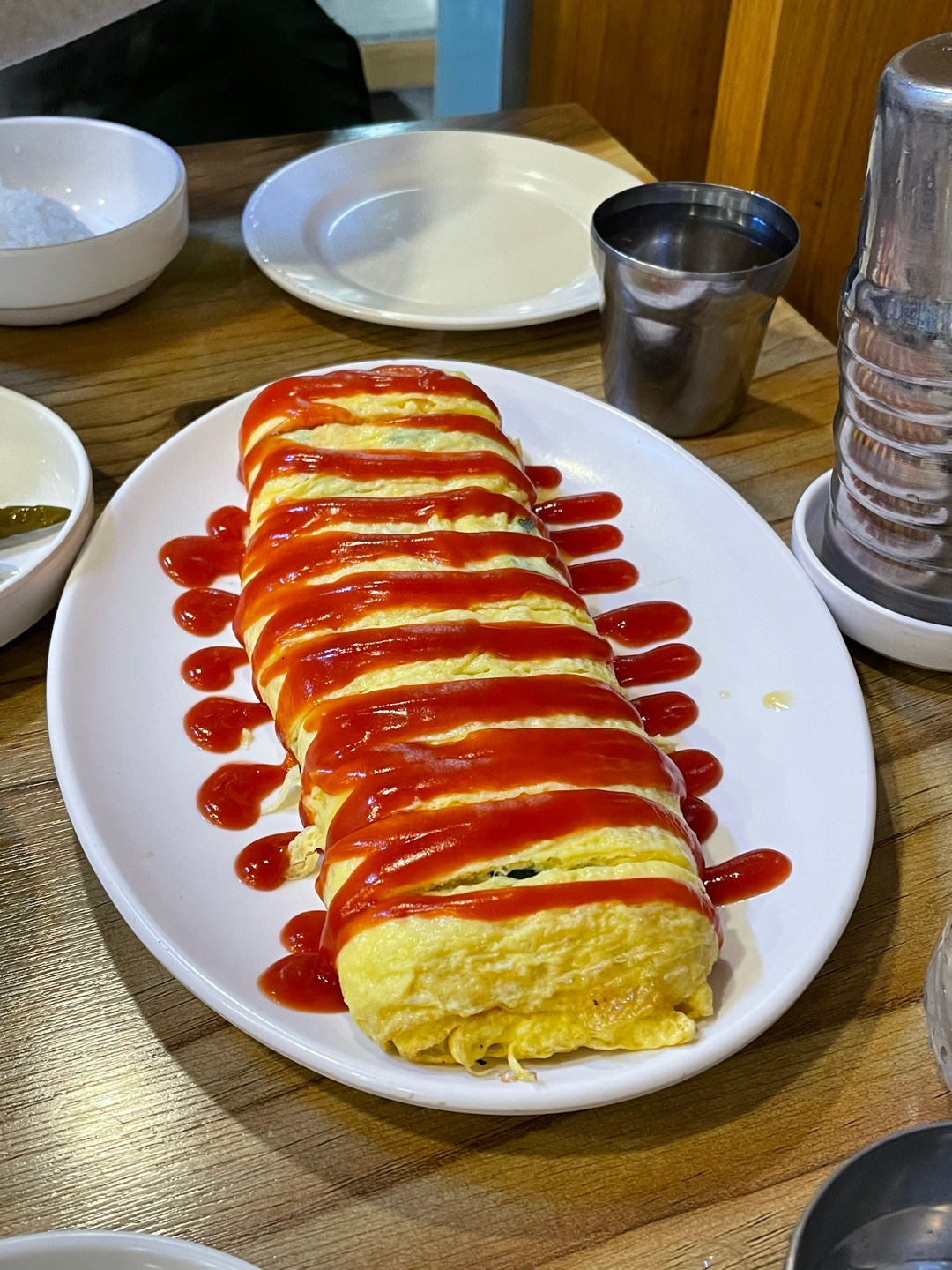
Gyeran-mari with ketchup on it.

Gyeran-mari (Korean: 계란말이, "rolled-eggs"), dalgyal-mari (달걀말이) or rolled omelette is a dish in Korean cuisine. It is a savory banchan (side dish) made with beaten eggs mixed with several finely diced ingredients, then progressively fried and rolled. Common ingredients include vegetables (onion, carrot, Korean zucchini, scallions, garlic chives), mushroom, processed meat (ham, bacon, imitation crab meat, canned tuna), salt or salted seafood (salted pollock roe, salted shrimp), and cheese. Optionally, gim (seaweed laver) is folded with the omelette. When served, the omelette is cut into 2–3 centimetres (0.79–1.18 in) slices. It is also a common anju found at pojangmacha (street stalls).

== Gallery ==
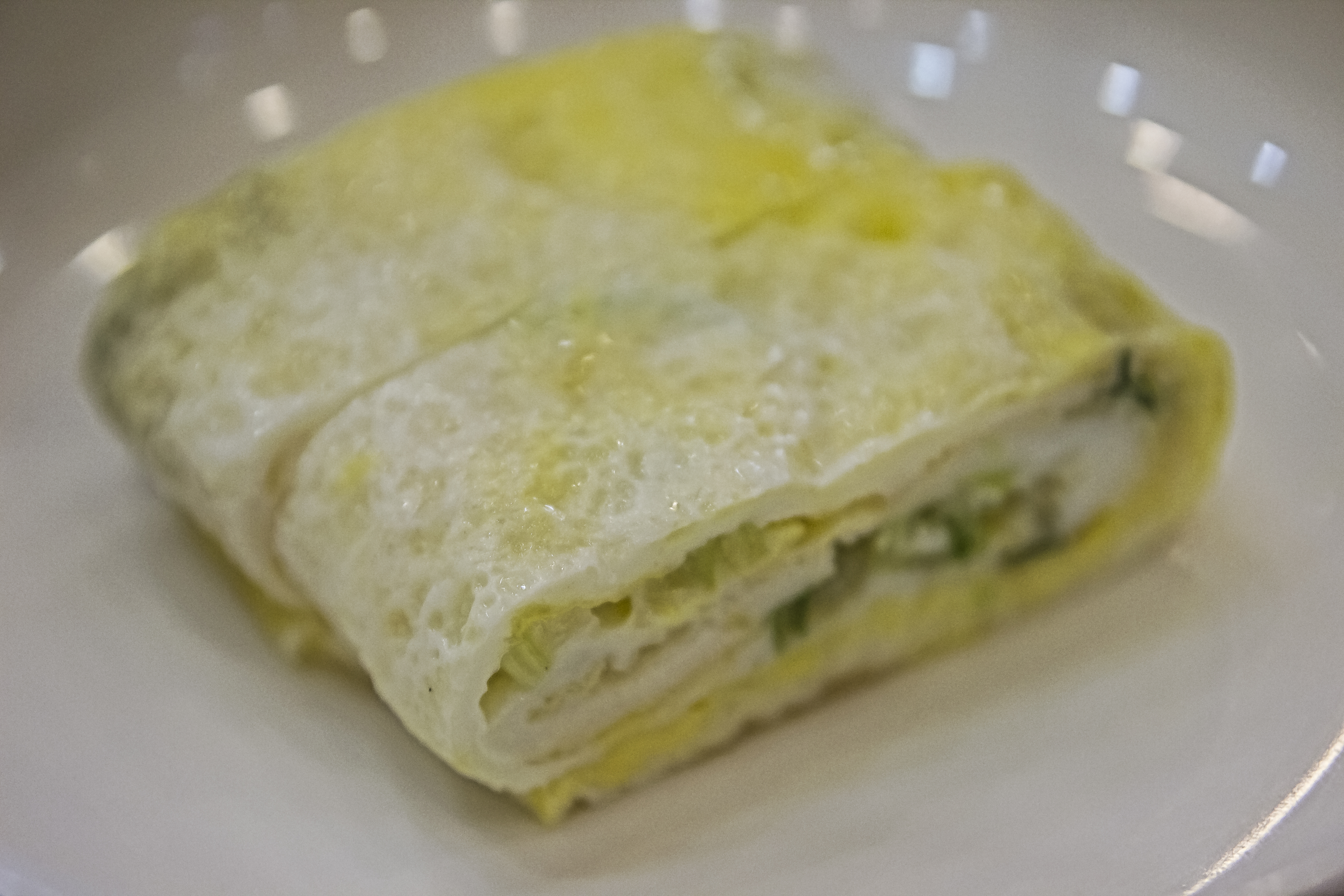
Gyeran-mari (rolled omelette)

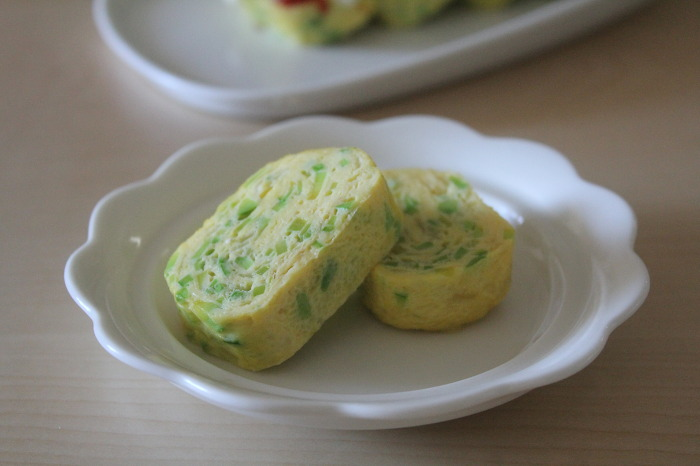
Aehobak-gyeran-mari (rolled omelette with aehobak)

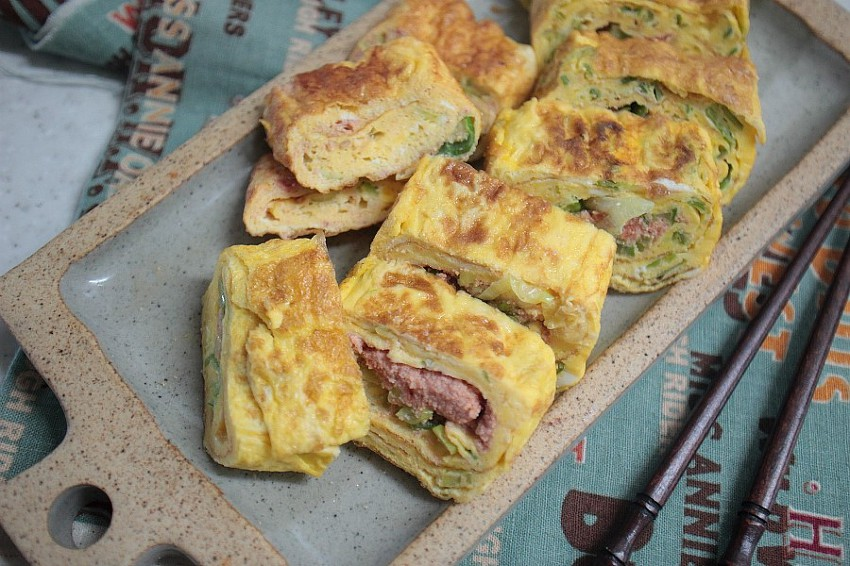
Myeongnan-jeot-gyeran-mari (rolled omelette with salted pollock roe)

== See also ==
- Egg roll
- Omelette
- Tamagoyaki
- List of egg dishes
