= Karit fruit =

Variety of melon

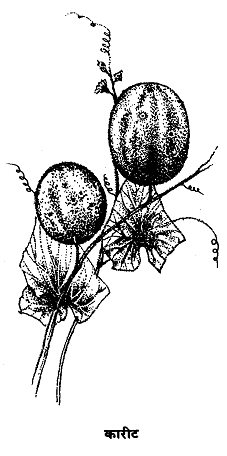
Karit

The karit fruit (Marathi: kaarate; कारटे) (Cucumis melo var. agrestis) is a variety of melon found in India. Similar to an Indian cucumber, the karit has a rather bitter taste. The fruit plays a part in the Diwali traditions of Goa and Maharashtra. This fruit is stamped by the heel of the left foot on the second day of Diwali by everyone after all come out of baths. Its significance is when Lord Krishna kills the demon Narakasura by stamping his heel of left foot and destroys him.
