= Galia melon =

Hybrid melon

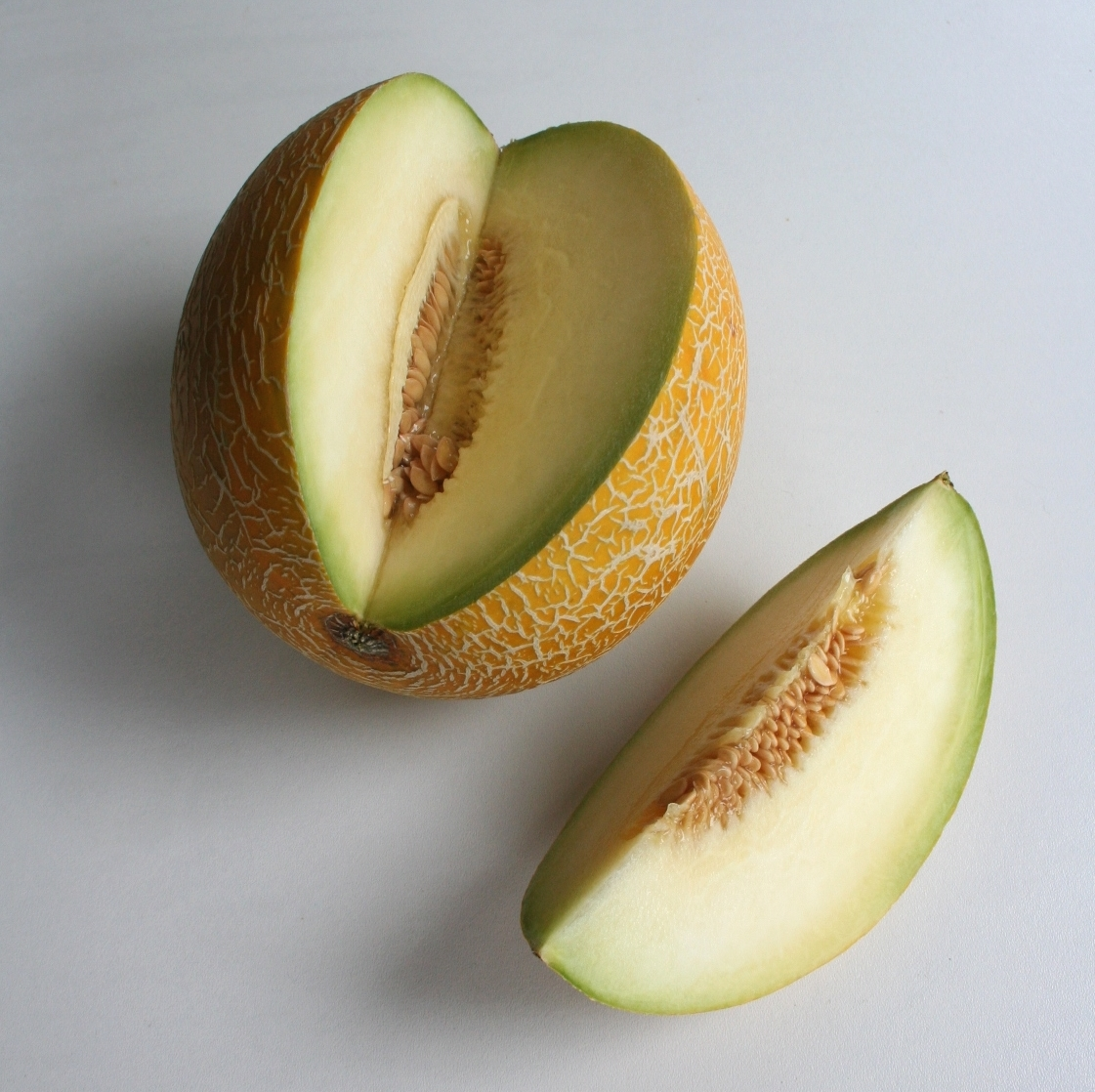
- Species: Cucumis melo
- Hybrid parentage: 'Ha'Ogen' × 'Krymka'
- Breeder: Dr. Zvi Karchi
- Origin: Israel

The Galia melon, also known as sarda in Southeast Asia, is a type of F_{1} hybrid melon (Cucumis melo) originating from a cross between the green-flesh cantaloupe (Cantalupensis Group) 'Ha'Ogen' and the netted-rind early melon (Chandalak Group) 'Krymka' (sometimes as 'Krimka'). Developed in Israel at the Ne´ve Yaar Research Center of the Agricultural Research Organisation by the melon breeder Dr. Zvi Karchi, and released in 1973, the Galia melon was named after Karchi's daughter, whose name means "God's wave" in Hebrew.

According to the trade type definition, the fruits of the Galia have the following characteristics: the average weight for a Galia melon is one kilogram. They have a rounded shape, a dense netting of rough lines on the skin, and become yellow at full maturity; they are sweet and aromatic, with a special aroma and flavor and a very high content of total soluble solids (values up to 18° are possible, although the minimum value to be considered commercially mature is 11°). Ripeness is measured not by softness at the stem, but rather by color of the skin, when it starts turning from green to yellow. Left at room temperature, Galia keeps well, but after cutting, uneaten pieces should be wrapped and refrigerated to preserve flavor.

They are not particularly difficult to grow. Galias are now grown in Algeria, Brazil, Guatemala, Portugal, Spain, Morocco, Southern US regions, Costa Rica, Panama, Honduras, Greece, Turkey, Palestine, and Egypt.
