= Pojangmacha =

Street stall operating out of small tents found in South Korea

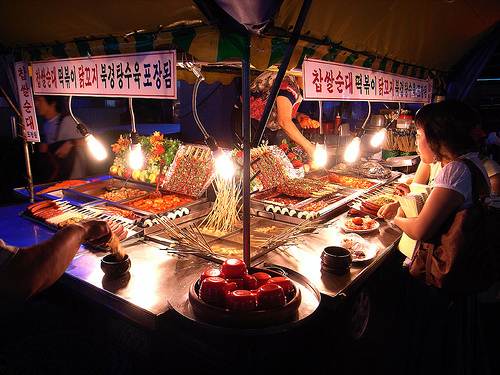
- Customers seated at a pojangmacha in Gwangju (2006)

Korean name
- Hangul: 포장마차
- Hanja: 布帳馬車
- RR: pojangmacha
- MR: p'ojangmach'a

Pojangmacha (Korean: 포장마차; lit. ''covered wagon''), also abbreviated as pocha (포차), is a South Korean term for outdoor carts that sell street foods such as hotteok, gimbap, tteokbokki, sundae, dak-kkochi (Korean skewered chicken), fish cake, mandu, and anju (foods accompanying drinks). In the evening, many of these establishments serve alcoholic beverages such as soju.

Pojangmacha is a popular place for late-night snacks or drinks. The food sold in these places can usually be eaten quickly while standing, or taken away. Some offer cheap chairs or benches for customers to sit, especially the ones serving late-night customers who come to drink soju.

As of 2012, there were approximately 3,100 pocha in Seoul.

Jongno is the most famous area for pojangmacha but other pojangmacha may be found in Gwangjang Market. Some pojangmacha in Jongno and other areas now offer set menus, with a combination of individual snacks put together on one plate.

== History ==
Pojangmacha developed in the 1950s, after the end of Japanese rule in 1945. Vendors operated then much as they do today, although their equipment has changed. Mobile food carts were made stationary, wooden poles were erected around the cart, and cotton cloth would be hung around the cart to protect it and the customers from the elements. Over time, wood changed to metal, and cotton changed to tarpaulin. Carbide lamps were converted to incandescent lights, fluorescent lights, and then to LEDs.

Popular foods in the 1950s included naengmyeon (cold noodles), sundae (sausages), bindae-tteok (mung bean pancakes), mandu (dumplings), and grilled seafood. During this period, pojangmacha served refugees during the Korean War. Stalls also served alcohol, including soju, makgeolli, and beer.

Since the 1980s, pojangmacha staple foods have reportedly remained relatively consistent. Around that time, stalls in Seoul, particularly in the Gangnam area, began receiving dedicated water and electricity.

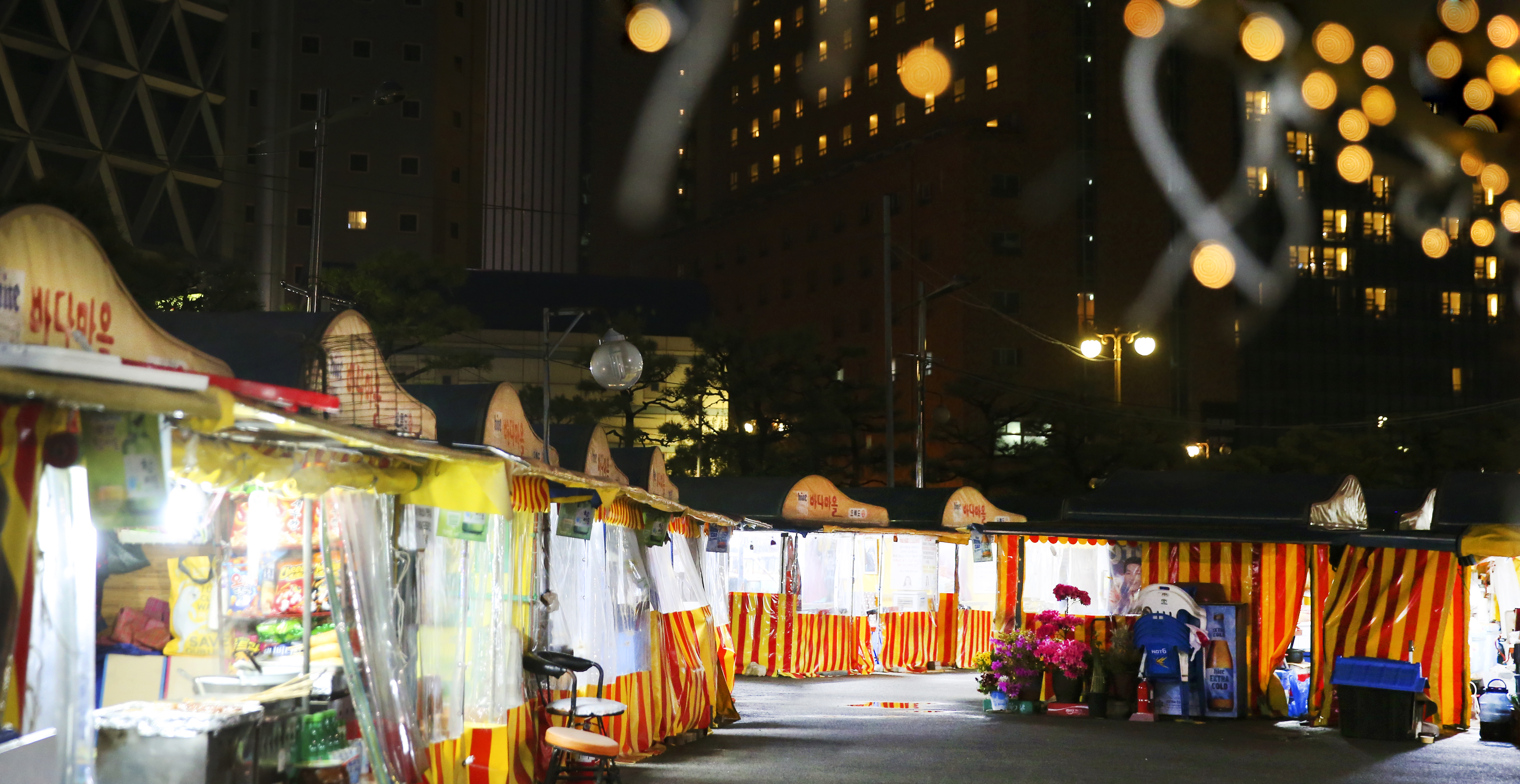
Pojangmacha in Haeundae Beach, Busan (2019)

In recent times, pocha has become an aesthetic in itself. They feature prominently in South Korean dramas and films. Some indoor restaurants and bars attempt to replicate the aesthetic, and are dubbed "indoor pojangmacha" (실내 포장마차).

== Menu ==
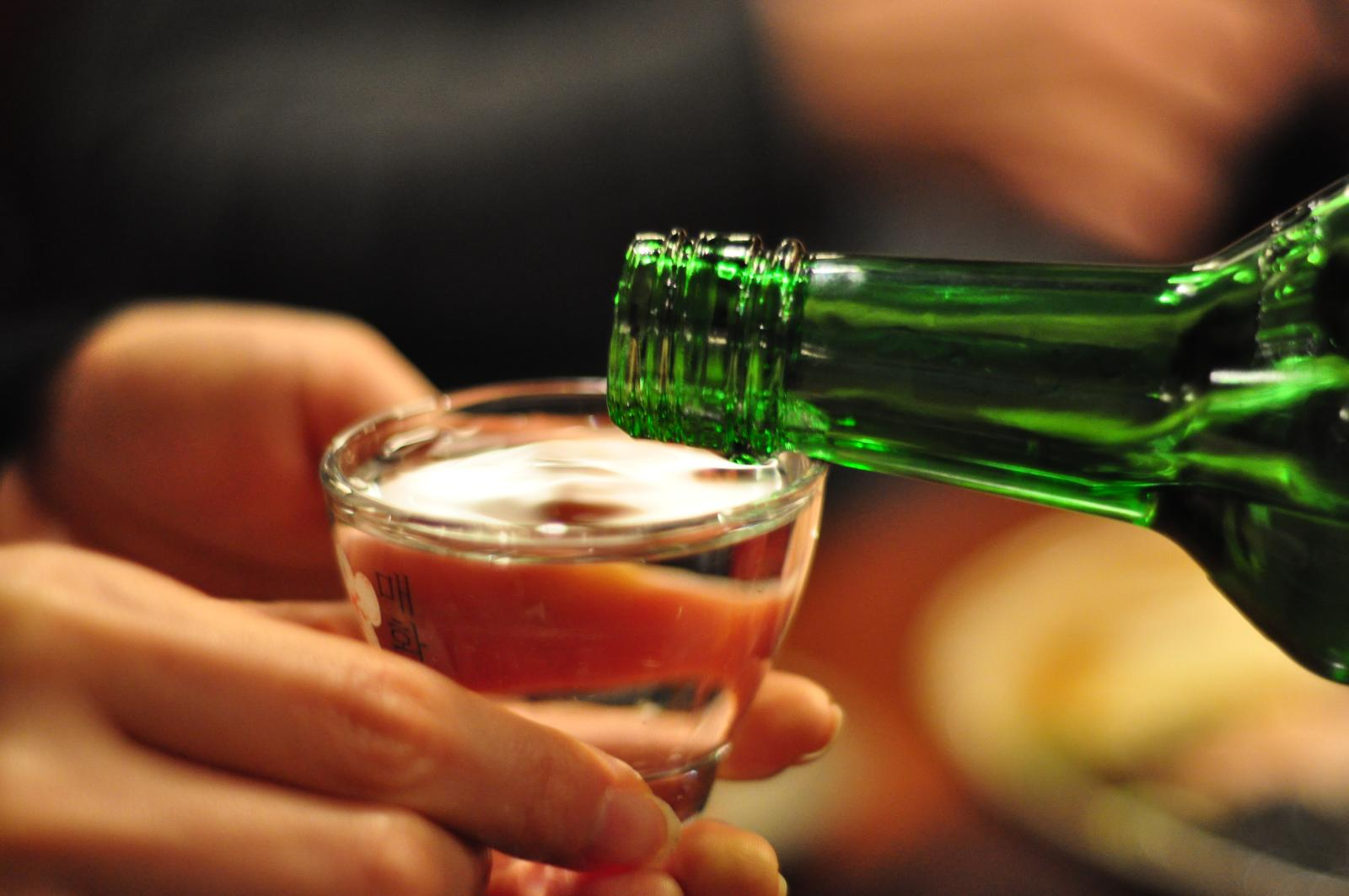
Soju, one of the most famous Korean alcoholic drinks

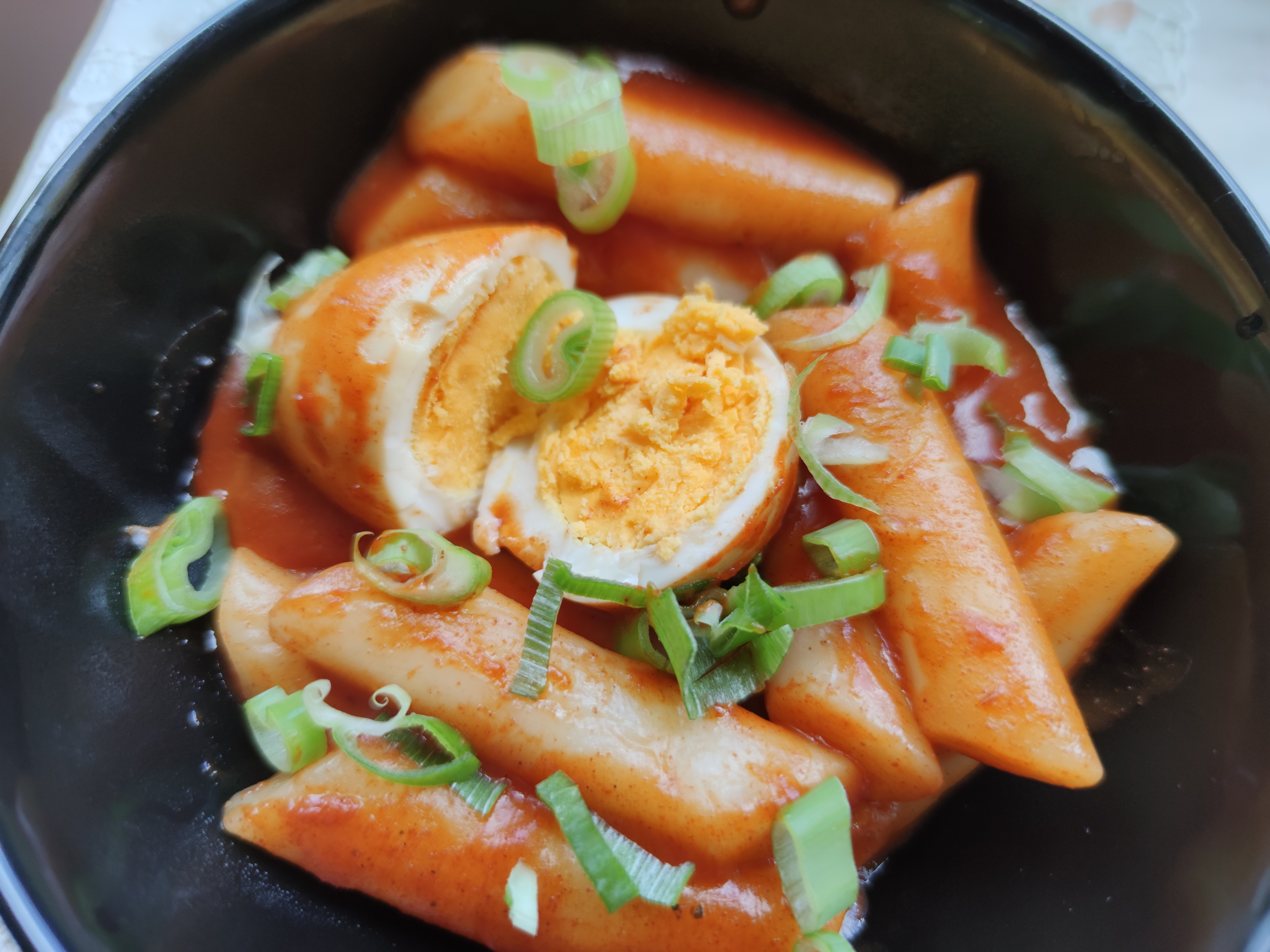
Korean street food: tteokbokki with rice cake and egg

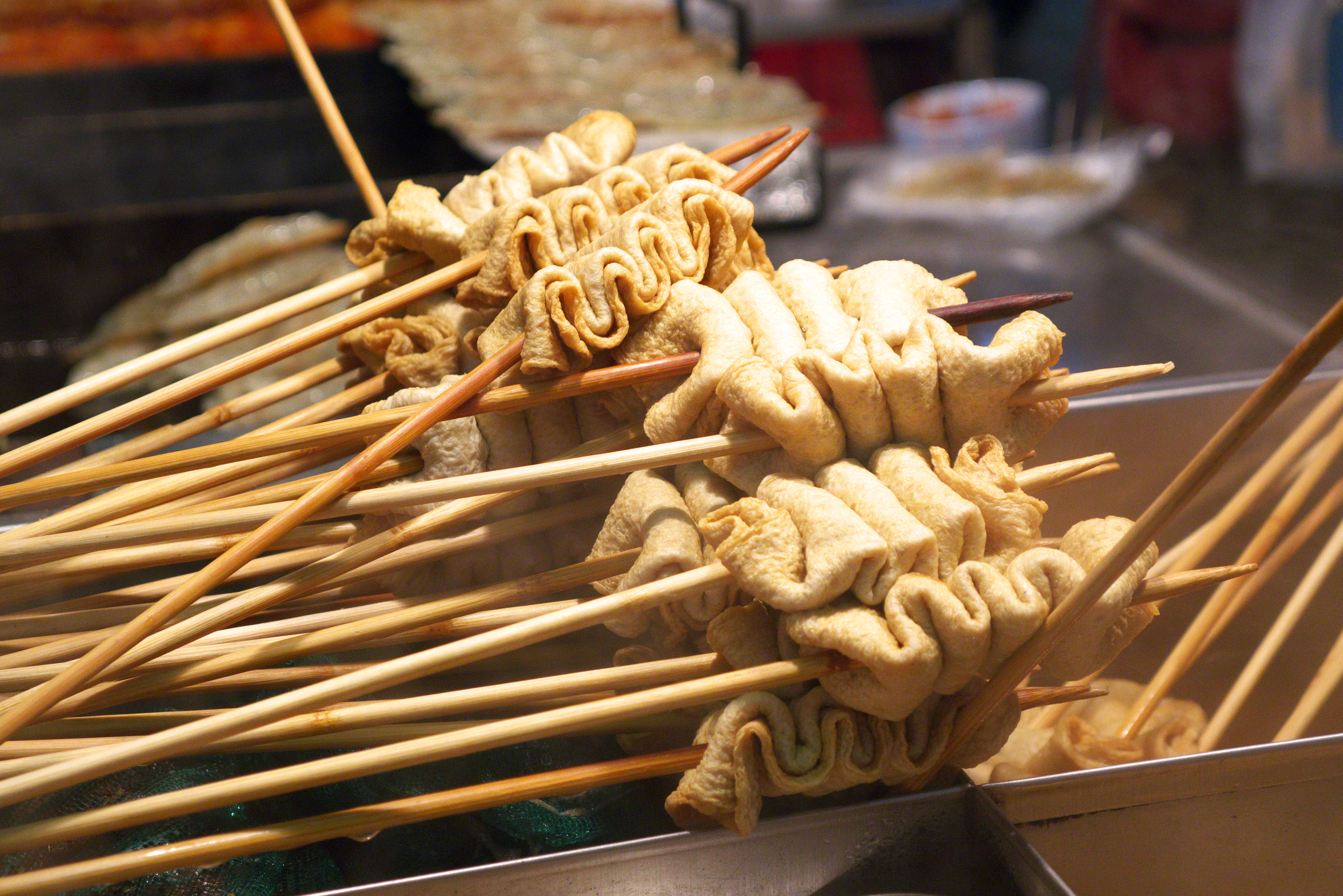
Skewered eomuk

Some stalls in Jongno, Seoul, and other places offer set menus. For example, gimbap, tteokbokki, and sundae may be served on one plate.

=== Drinks ===
- Soju (소주)
- Makgeolli (막걸리)
- Beer

=== Food ===
- Dakbal (닭발)
- Twigim (튀김)
- Hoe (회)
- Tteokbokki (떡볶이)
- Eomuk (어묵)
- Gyeranmari (계란말이)
- Jeyuk bokkeum (제육볶음)
- Kimchi dubu (김치두부)

== See also ==
- Food cart
- Food truck
- List of markets in South Korea
- Mobile catering
- Street food in South Korea
- Yatai
