= Bukkumi =

Korean-cuisine pan-fried rice cake

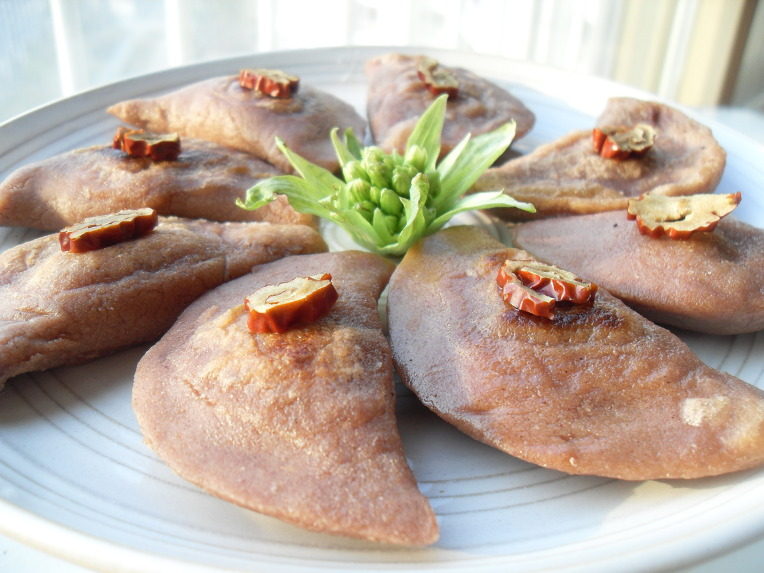
- Susu-bukkumi (pan-fried sorghum cake)
- Type: Tteok
- Place of origin: Korea
- Associated cuisine: Korean cuisine

Korean name
- Hangul: 부꾸미
- RR: bukkumi
- MR: pukkumi
- IPA: [pu.k͈u.mi]

Bukkumi (Korean: 부꾸미) is a pan-fried tteok (rice cake) made with glutinous rice flour or sorghum flour. It is a flat half-moon shaped cake filled with white adzuki bean paste or mixture of toasted and ground sesame seeds, cinnamon powder, and sugar or honey. The color varies from white to yellow, pink, or dark green. Bukkumi is often coated with honey or syrup, and garnished with shredded chestnuts, jujube, or rock tripe. There is also a variety of bukkumi which is flat and round and does not have any filling.

== See also ==
- Hwajeon
