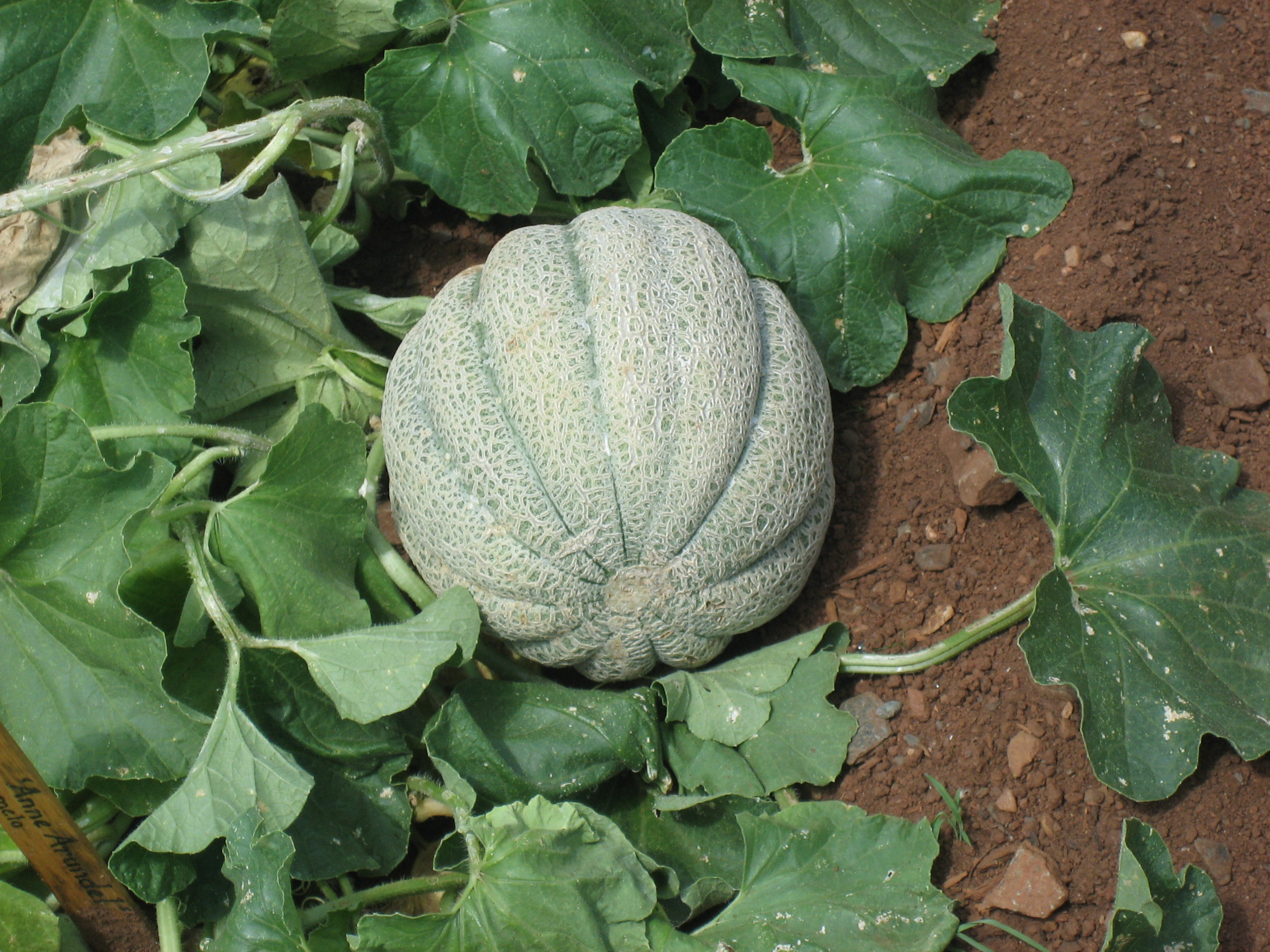

Scientific classification
- Kingdom: Plantae
- Clade: Tracheophytes
- Clade: Angiosperms
- Clade: Eudicots
- Clade: Rosids
- Order: Cucurbitales
- Family: Cucurbitaceae
- Genus: Cucumis
- Species: C. melo

Binomial name
- Cucumis melo L.

Synonyms
- List: Cucumis acidus Jacq.; Cucumis agrestis (Naudin) Greb. nom. inval.; Cucumis alba Nakai; Cucumis ambiguus Fenzl ex Hook.f. nom. inval.; Cucumis arenarius Schumach. & Thonn.; Cucumis aromaticus Royle; Cucumis bardanus Fenzl ex Naudin nom. inval.; Cucumis bisexualis A.M.Lu & G.C.Wang; Cucumis callosus (Rottler) Cogn.; Cucumis campechianus Kunth; Cucumis cantalupensis Haberle ex M.Roem. nom. illeg.; Cucumis cantalupo Rchb.; Cucumis chate Hasselq.; Cucumis chate L.; Cucumis chinensis (Pangalo) Pangalo; Cucumis chito C.Morren; Cucumis cicatrisatus Stocks; Cucumis cognata Fenzl ex Hook.f. nom. inval.; Cucumis conomon Thunb.; Cucumis cubensis Schrad.; Cucumis deliciosus Salisb. nom. illeg.; Cucumis dudaim L.; Cucumis eriocarpus Boiss. & Noë; Cucumis erivanicus Steud. nom. inval.; Cucumis flexuosus L.; Cucumis jamaicensis Bertero ex Spreng.; Cucumis jucunda F.Muell.; Cucumis laevigatus Chiov.; Cucumis maculatus Willd.; Cucumis microcarpus (Alef.) Pangalo; Cucumis microsperma Nakai; Cucumis microspermus Nakai; Cucumis momordica Roxb.; Cucumis moschatus Gray nom. illeg.; Cucumis odoratissimus Moench nom. illeg.; Cucumis odoratissimus W.M.Carp. & Riddell nom. illeg.; Cucumis officinarum-melo Crantz; Cucumis orientalis Kudr.; Cucumis pancherianus Naudin; Cucumis pedatifidus Schrad.; Cucumis persicodorus Seitz; Cucumis persicus (Sarg.) M.Roem.; Cucumis pictus Jacq.; Cucumis princeps Wender.; Cucumis pseudocolocynthis Royle; Cucumis pseudocolocynthis Wender.; Cucumis pubescens Willd.; Cucumis pyriformis Roxb. ex Wight & Arn. nom. inval.; Cucumis reflexus Zeyh. ex Ser. nom. inval.; Cucumis reginae Schrad.; Cucumis schraderianus M.Roem.; Cucumis serotinus Haberle ex Seitz; Cucumis trigonus Roxb.; Cucumis turbinatus Roxb.; Cucumis umbilicatus Salisb. nom. illeg.; Cucumis utilissimus Roxb.; Cucumis villosus Boiss. & Noë nom. inval.; Cucurbita aspera Sol. ex G.Forst. nom. inval.; Ecballium lambertianum M.Roem.; Melo adana (Pangalo) Pangalo; Melo adzhur Pangalo; Melo agrestis (Naudin) Pangalo; Melo ameri Pangalo; Melo cantalupensis (Naudin) Pangalo; Melo cassaba Pangalo; Melo chandalak Pangalo; Melo chinensis Pangalo; Melo conomon Pangalo; Melo dudaim (L.) Sageret; Melo figari Pangalo; Melo flexuosus (L.) Pangalo; Melo microcarpus (Alef.) Pangalo; Melo monoclinus Pangalo; Melo orientalis (Kudr.) Nabiev; Melo persicus Sageret; Melo sativus Sageret; Melo vulgaris Moench ex Cogn.; Melo zard Pangalo; Melo × ambiguua Pangalo

= Cucumis melo =

Species of plant

Cucumis melo, also known as melon or true melon, is a species of Cucumis that has been developed into many cultivated varieties. The fruit is a pepo. The flesh is either sweet or bland, with or without an aroma, and the rind can be smooth (such as honeydew), ribbed (such as European cantaloupe), wrinkled (such as Casaba melon) or netted (such as American cantaloupe). The species is sometimes referred to as muskmelon. However, there is no consensus about the usage of this term, as it can also be used as a specific name for the musky netted-rind American cantaloupe, or as a generic name for any sweet-flesh variety such the inodorous smooth-rind honeydew melon.

Melon were domesticated four times independently. Research has revealed that seeds and rootstocks were among the goods traded along the caravan routes of the Ancient World. Some botanists consider melons native to the Levant and Egypt, while others place their origin in Iran, India or Central Asia. Still others support an African origin; in modern times, wild melons can still be found in some African countries.

== Cultivation ==
The melon is an annual, trailing herb. It grows well in subtropical or warm, temperate climates. It can be found as a weed around sites of recently built airports in American Samoa.

Melons prefer warm, well-fertilized soil with good drainage that is rich in nutrients, but are vulnerable to downy mildew and anthracnose. Disease risk is reduced by crop rotation with non-cucurbit crops, avoiding crops susceptible to similar diseases as melons. Cross pollination has resulted in some varieties developing resistance to powdery mildew.

Arthropod pest species attracted to melons include the cucumber beetle, Aphis gossypii, melonworm moth and the pickleworm.

== Genetics ==
Genomic information
- NCBI ID: 3656
- Ploidy: diploid
- Genome size: 374.77 Mb
- Number of chromosomes: 12
- Year of completion: 2012

Melons are monoecious or andromonoecious plants. They do not cross with watermelon, cucumber, pumpkin, or squash, but varieties within the species intercross frequently. The genome of Cucumis melo was first sequenced in 2012. Some authors treat C. melo as having two subspecies, C. melo agrestis and C. melo melo. Variants within these subspecies fall into groups whose genetics largely agree with their phenotypic traits, such as disease resistance, rind texture, flesh color, and fruit shape. Variants or landraces (some of which were originally classified as species; see the synonyms list to the right) include C. melo var. acidulus (Mangalore melon), adana, agrestis (wild melon), ameri (summer melon), cantalupensis (cantaloupe), reticulatus (muskmelon), chandalak, chate, chito, conomon (Oriental pickling melon), dudaim (pocket melon), flexuosus (snake melon), inodorus (winter melon), momordica (snap melon), tibish, chinensis and makuwa (Oriental melon).

Not all varieties are sweet melons. The snake melon, also called the Armenian cucumber and Serpent cucumber, is a non-sweet melon found throughout Asia from Turkey to Japan. It is similar to a cucumber in taste and appearance. Outside Asia, snake melons are grown in the United States, Italy, Sudan and parts of North Africa, including Egypt. The snake melon is more popular in Arab countries.

Other varieties grown in Africa are bitter, cultivated for their edible seeds.

For commercially grown varieties certain features such as protective hard netting and firm flesh are preferred for purposes of shipping and other requirements of commercial markets.

== Nutrition ==
For a reference amount of 100 g (3.5 oz), a raw cantaloupe melon provides 34 calories and is a rich source (defined as at least 20% of Daily Value, DV) of both vitamin A and vitamin C; other micronutrients are at a negligible level. A raw melon is 90% water and 9% carbohydrates, with less than 1% each of protein and fat.

== Uses ==
In addition to their consumption when fresh, melons are sometimes dried. Other varieties are cooked, or grown for their seeds, which are processed to produce melon oil. Still other varieties are grown only for their pleasant fragrance. The Japanese liqueur Midori is flavored with melon.

It was once a frequently cultivated plant in Tonga (katiu) as a snack and its flowers used for leis, but has since been extirpated.

== History ==
Melon were domesticated independently in Northeast Africa, twice in India and in China. Over time many cultivars developed with variety in shape and sweetness. Iran, India, Uzbekistan, Afghanistan and China became centers for melon production. Melons were consumed in Ancient Greece and Rome.

Debate exists among scholars whether the abattiach in The Book of Numbers 11:5 refers to a melon or a watermelon. Both types of melon were known in Ancient Egypt and other settled areas. Some botanists consider melons native to the Levant and Egypt, while others place the origin in Persia, India or Central Asia, thus the origin is uncertain. Researchers have shown that seeds and rootstocks were among the goods traded along the caravan routes of the Ancient World. Several scientists support an African origin, and in modern times wild melons can still be found in several African countries in East Africa such as Ethiopia, Somalia and Tanzania.

== Gallery ==
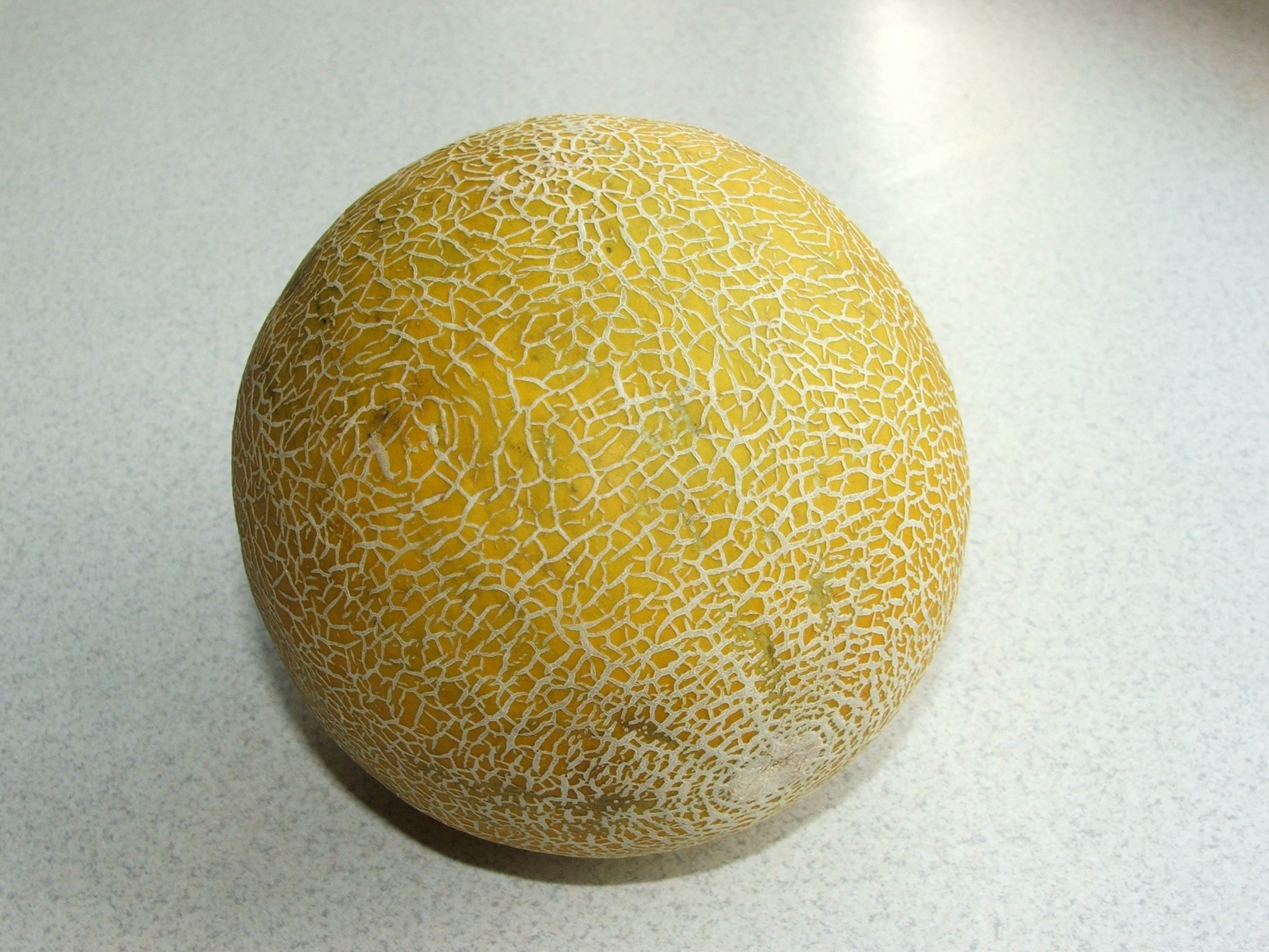
Galia melon

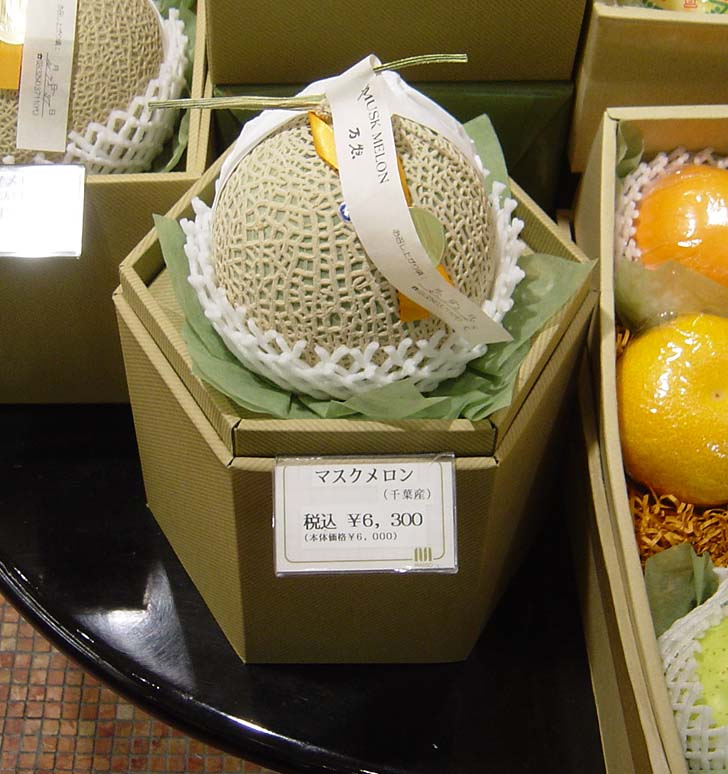
Japanese "crown melon" intended as a high-priced gift: The pictured crown melon is 6300 yen, or about US$59.

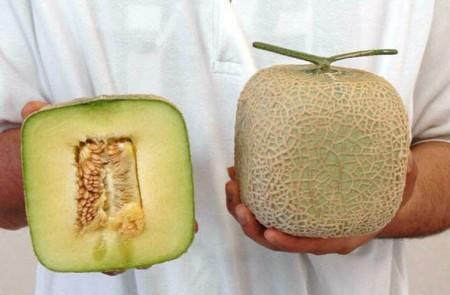
"Squared melon" grown in Atsumi District, Aichi Japan, known as kakumero

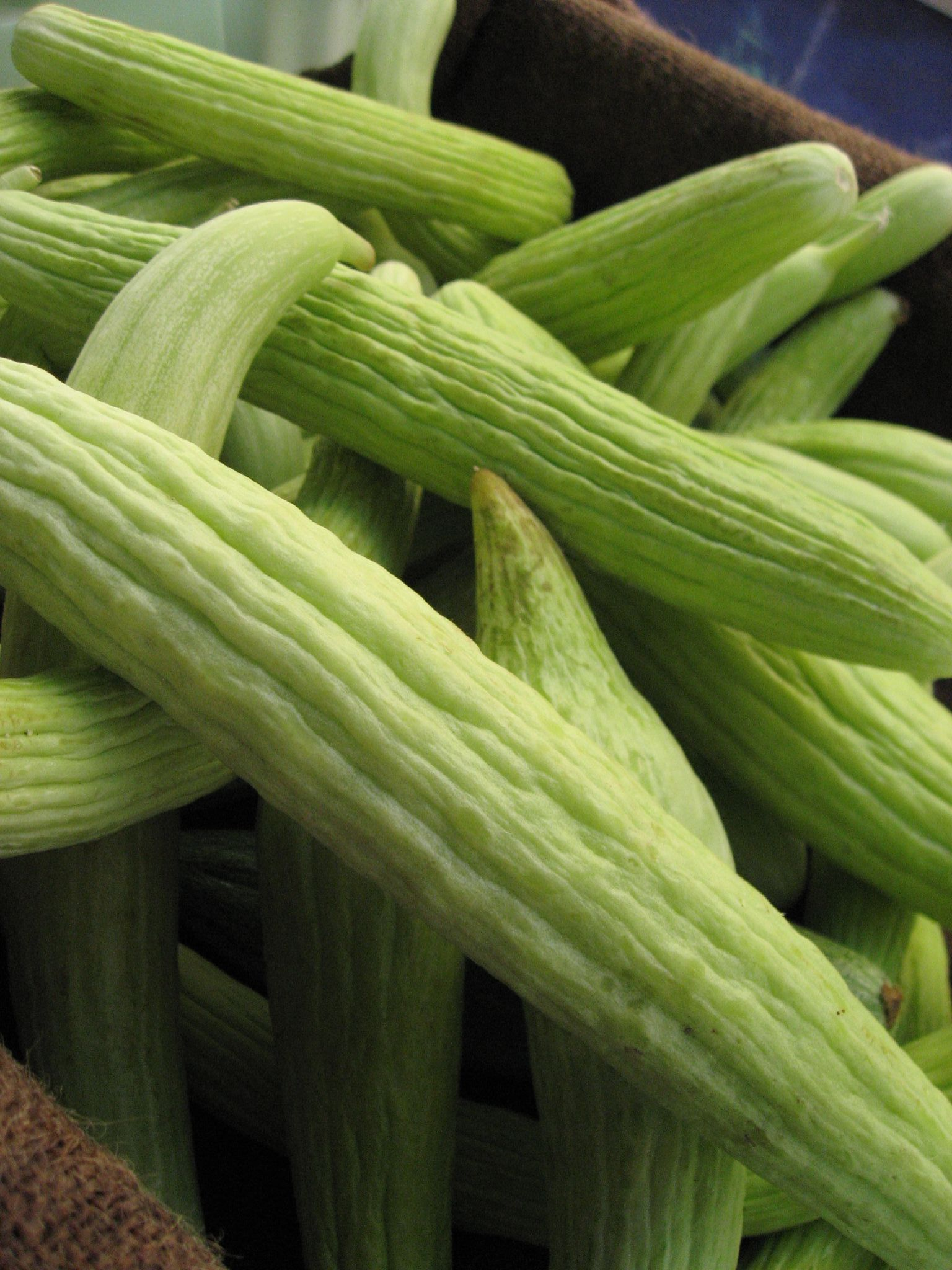
The Armenian cucumber, despite the name, is actually a type of melon.

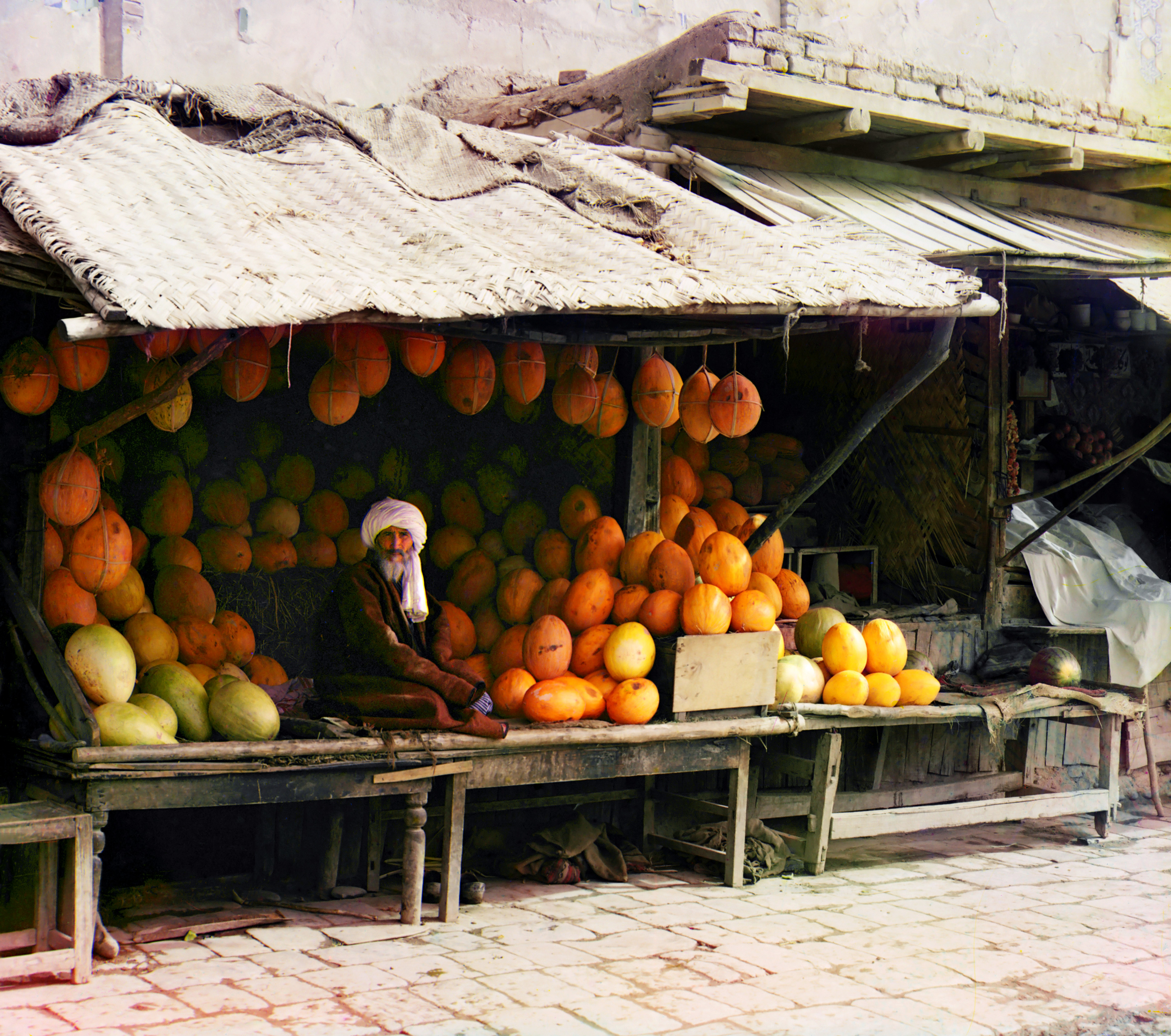
Melon vendor in Samarkand (between 1905 and 1915)

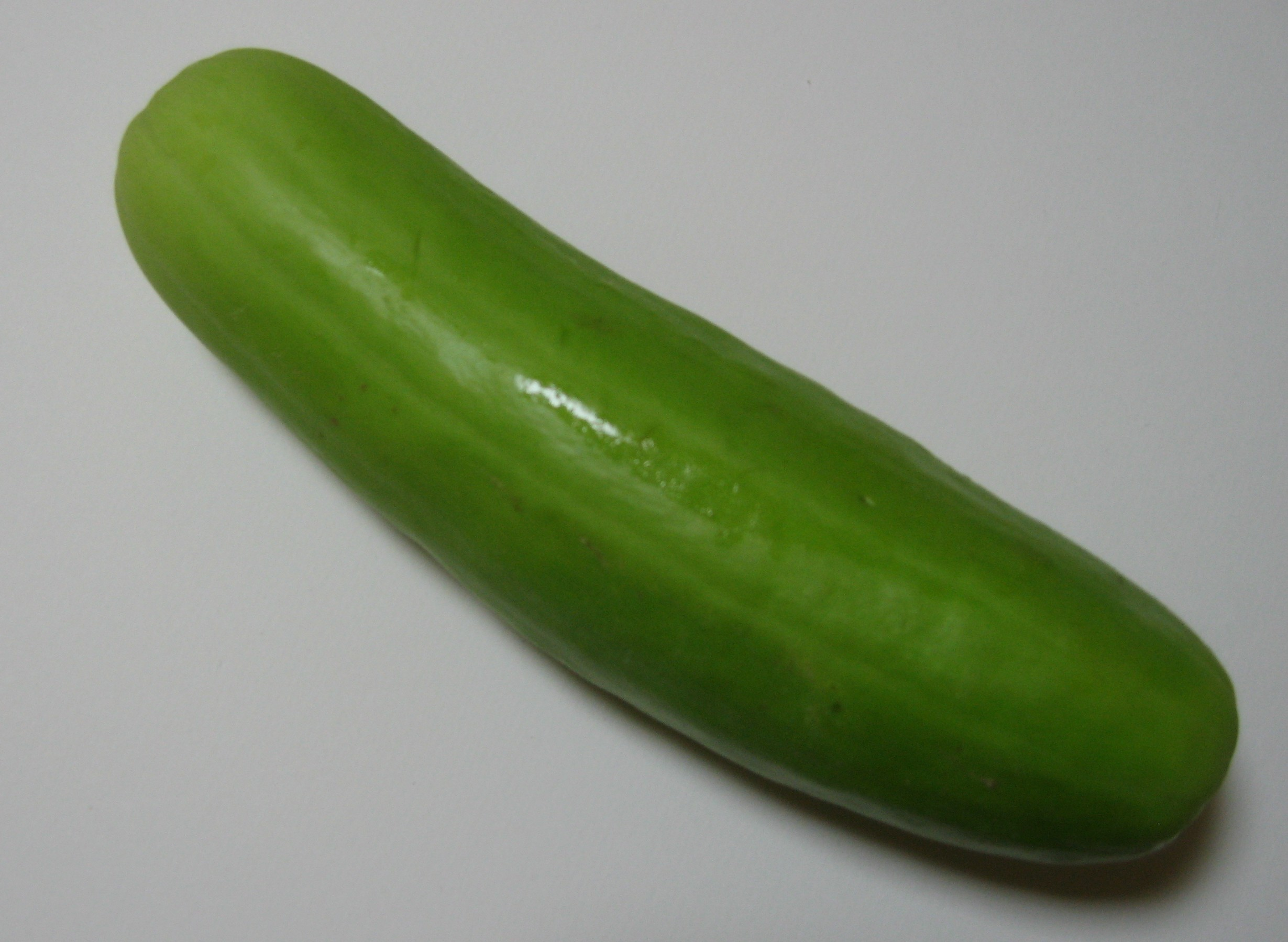
Oriental pickling melon

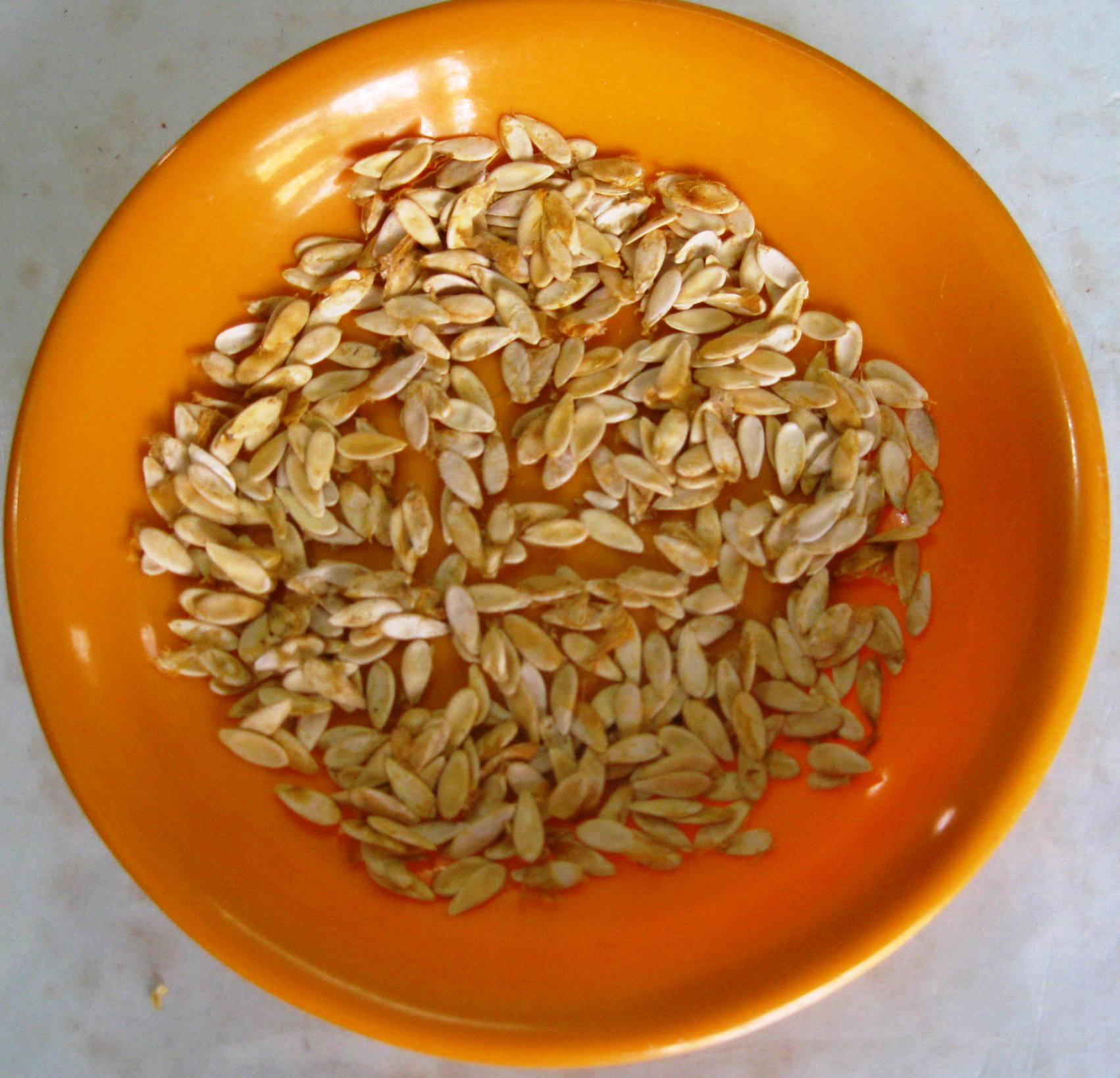
Muskmelon seeds

== See also ==
- Armenian cucumber – a cucumber-like variety of melon
- Bailan melon
- Barattiere – a landrace variety of melon found in southern Italy
- Canary melon
- Carosello – a landrace variety of melon found in southern Italy
- Crane melon
- Gaya melon
- Hami melon
- Korean melon
- Melon ball
- Melon Day
- Montreal melon
- Sugar melon
- Karit fruit
