= Cushaw =

Cushaw, or kershaw, is the common English name for:

- All types and varieties of Cucurbita argyrosperma, and its interspecific hybrids
- Certain varieties of Cucurbita moschata
