= Pumpkin =

Category of culinary winter Cucurbita squashes

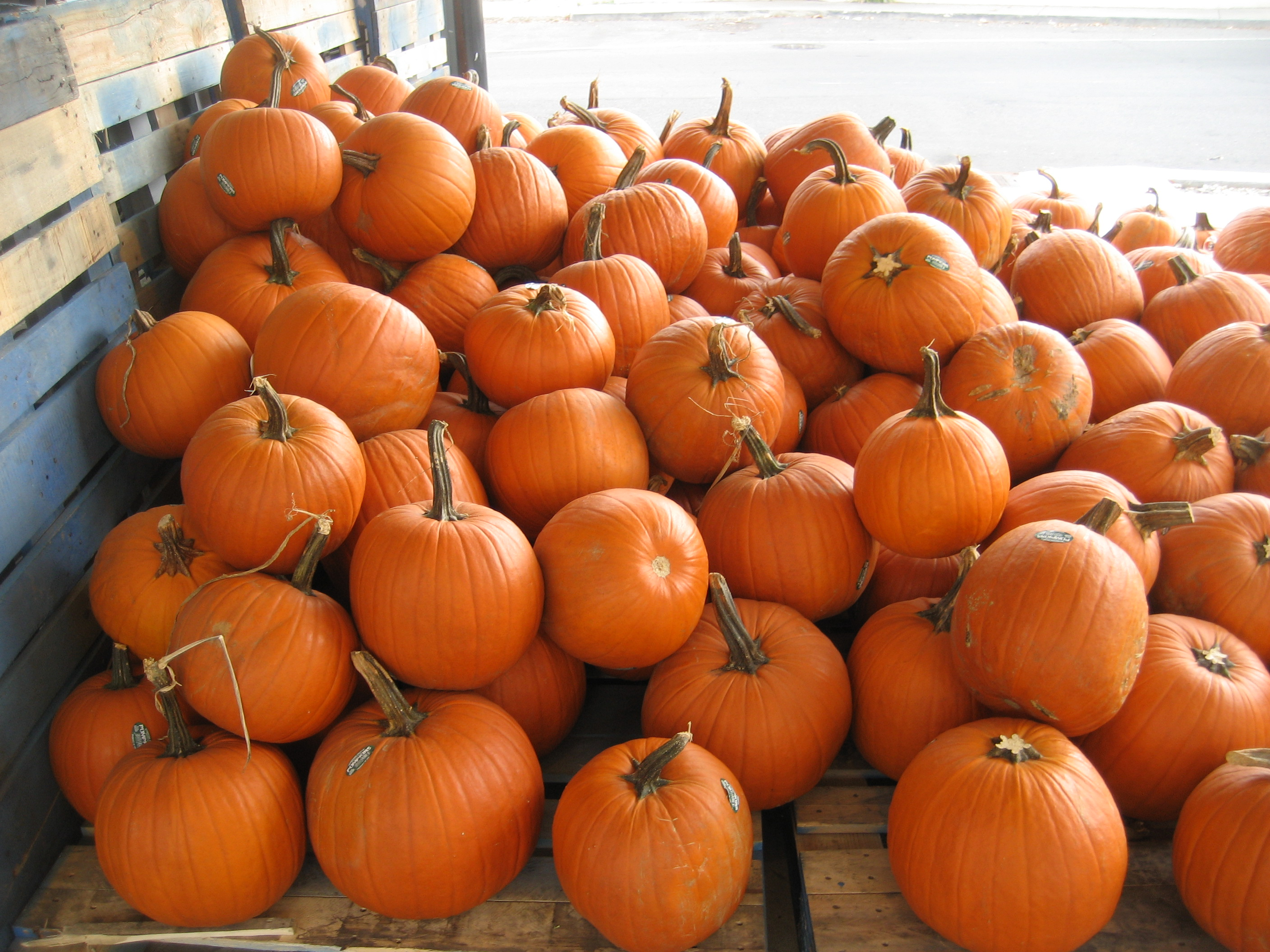
A pile of pumpkins at the French Market in New Orleans, Louisiana

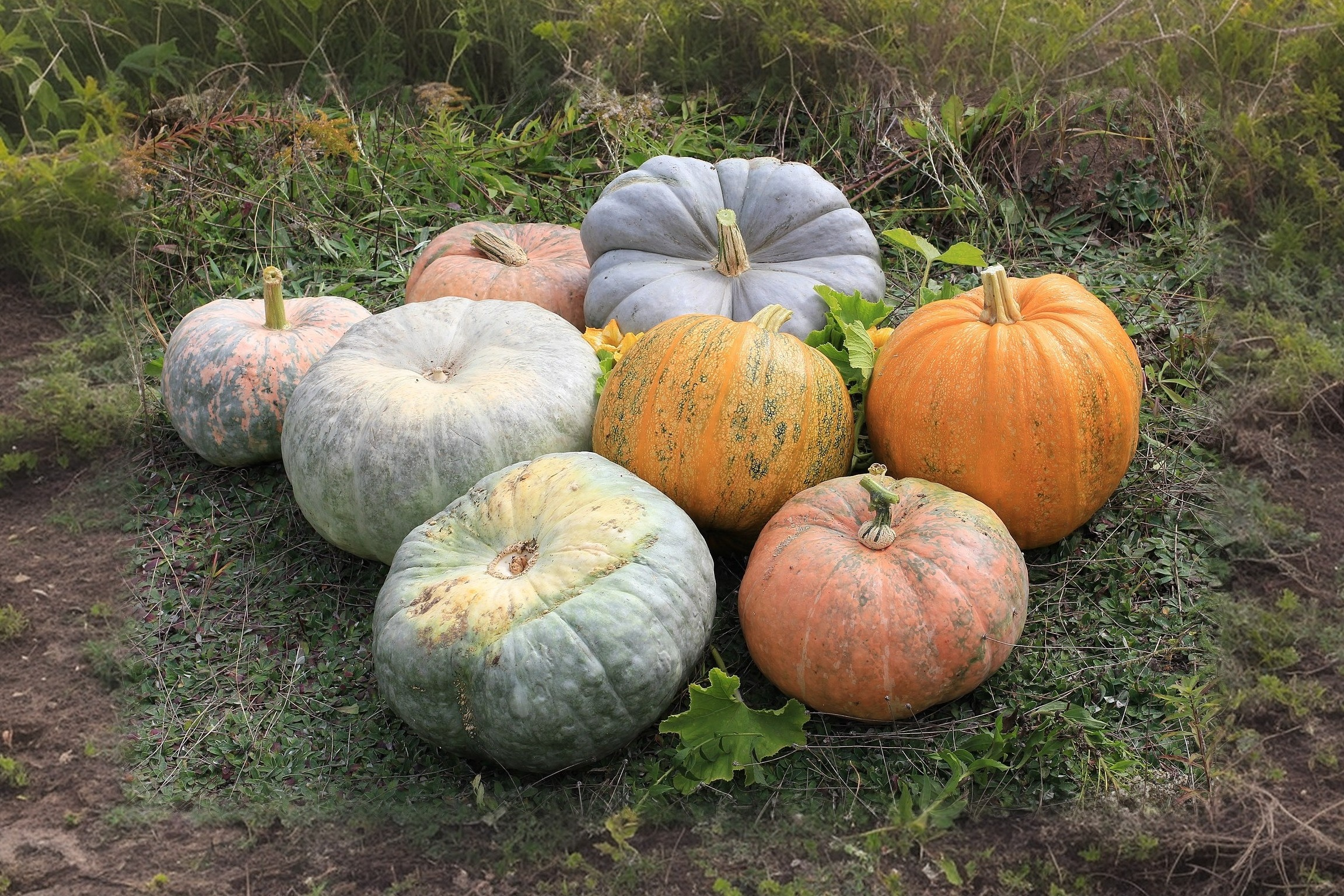
A variety of pumpkin cultivars. The central and rightmost orange fruits are Cucurbita pepo, all others are Cucurbita maxima

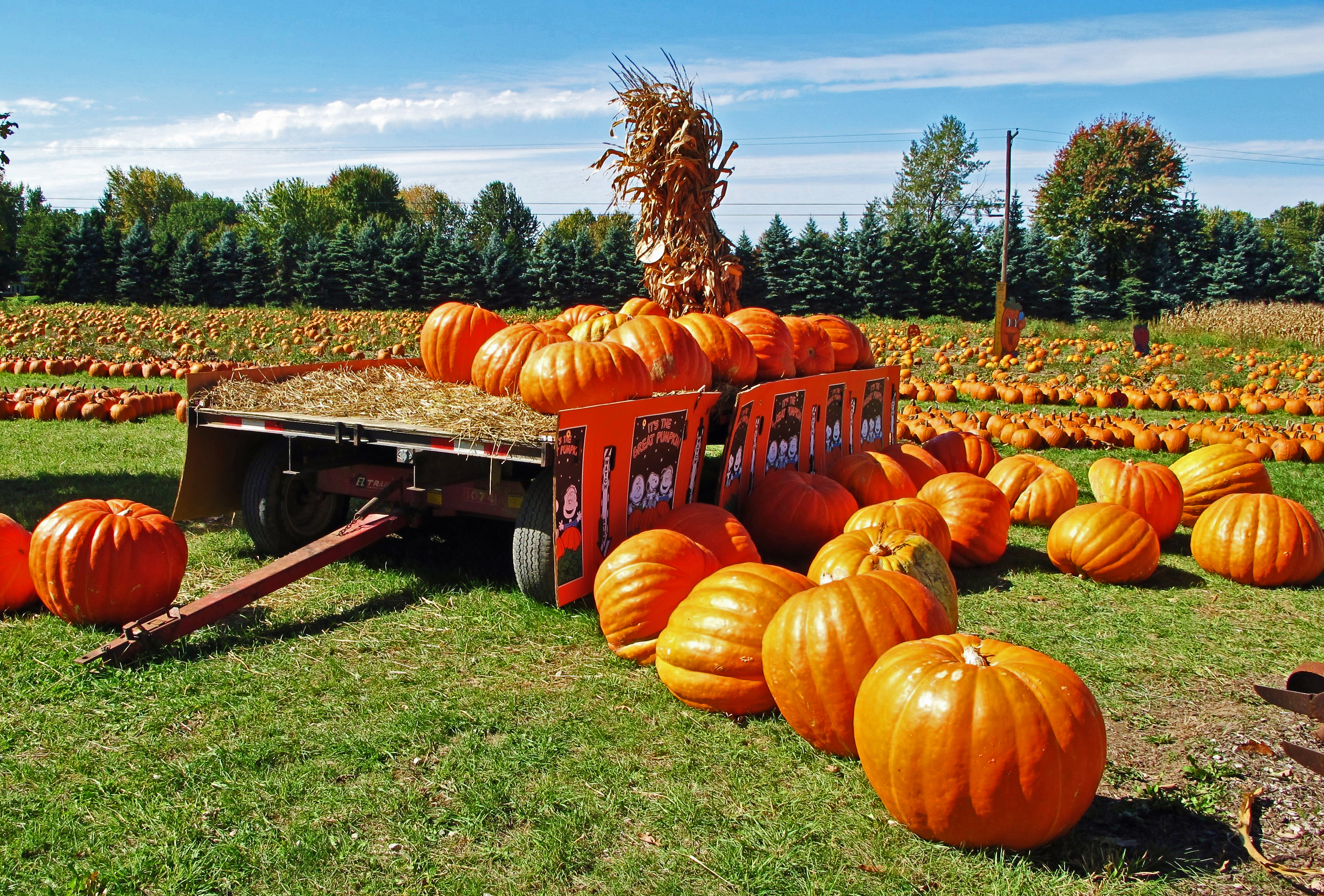
A field of giant pumpkins

A pumpkin is a cultivated winter squash in the genus Cucurbita. The term is most commonly applied to round, orange-colored squash varieties but It may be used in reference to multiple species of Cucurbita.

"Pumpkin" is sometimes used interchangeably with "squash" or "winter squash", and is commonly used for some cultivars of Cucurbita argyrosperma, Cucurbita ficifolia, Cucurbita maxima, Cucurbita moschata, and Cucurbita pepo.

C. pepo pumpkins are among the oldest known domesticated plants, with evidence of their cultivation dating to between 7000 BCE and 5500 BCE in Mesoamerica. Wild species of Cucurbita and the earliest domesticated species are native to North America (parts of present-day northeastern Mexico and the southern United States), but cultivars are now grown globally for culinary, decorative, and other culturally-specific purposes.

The pumpkin's thick shell encases edible seeds and pulp. Pumpkin pie is a traditional part of Thanksgiving meals in Canada and the United States and pumpkins are frequently used as autumnal seasonal decorations and carved as jack-o'-lanterns for decoration around Halloween. Commercially canned pumpkin purée and pie fillings are usually made of different pumpkin varieties from those intended for decorative use.

== Etymology and terminology ==
According to the Oxford English Dictionary, the English word pumpkin is a 17th-century corruption of the earlier pompion, denoting any of various kinds of edible gourd. The latter ultimately derives, via French and Latin, from Greek πέπων (pepōn).

An alternative theory derives pumpkin from the Massachusett word pôhpukun, meaning "grows forth round". This term could have been used by the Wampanoag people (who speak the Wôpanâak dialect of Massachusett) when introducing pumpkins to English Pilgrims at Plymouth Colony, located in present-day Massachusetts. (The English word squash is derived from a Massachusett word, askꝏtasquash, or, in the closely related Narragansett language, askútasquash.)

Researchers have noted that the term pumpkin and related terms like ayote and calabaza are applied to a range of winter squash with varying size and shape. The term tropical pumpkin is sometimes used for pumpkin cultivars of the species Cucurbita moschata.

== Description ==
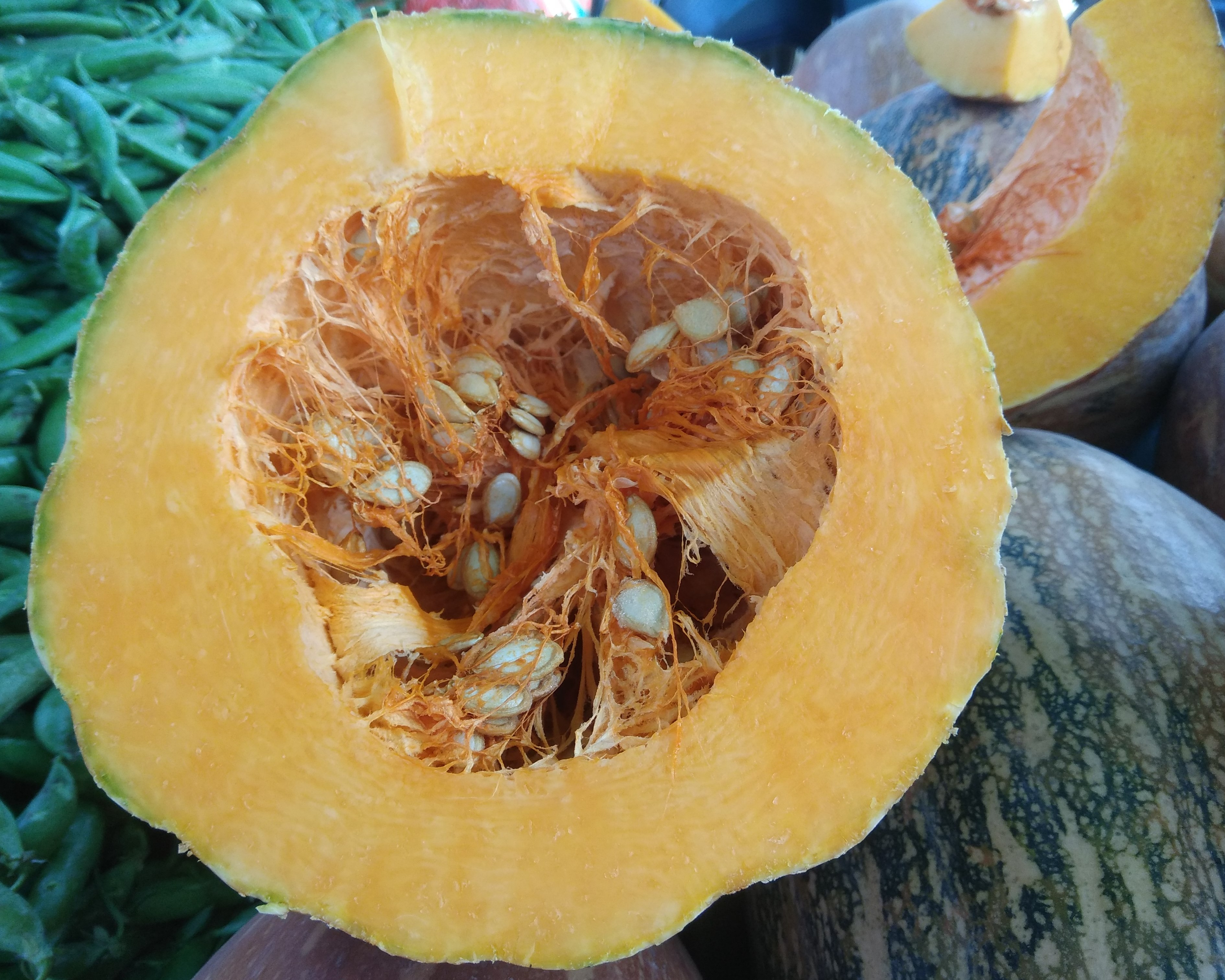
Cross section of a Cucurbita maxima pumpkin

Pumpkin fruits are a type of berry known as a pepo. Characteristics commonly used to define pumpkin include smooth and slightly ribbed skin and deep yellow to orange color, although white, green, and other pumpkin colors also exist.

While Cucurbita pepo pumpkins generally weigh between 3 and 8 kilograms (6 and 18 lb), giant pumpkins can exceed a tonne in mass. Most are varieties of C. maxima that were developed through the efforts of botanical societies and enthusiast farmers. The largest cultivars frequently reach weights of over 34 kg (75 lb). In October 2023, the record for heaviest pumpkin was set at 1,246.9 kg (2,749 lbs.).

== History ==
The oldest evidence of Cucurbita pepo is pumpkin fragments found in Mexico that are dated between 7,000 and 5,500 BC. Pumpkins and other squash species, alongside maize and beans, feature in the Three Sisters method of companion planting practiced by many North American indigenous societies. However, larger modern pumpkin cultivars are typically excluded, as their weight may damage the other crops. Within decades after Europeans began colonizing North America, illustrations of pumpkins similar to the modern cultivars Small Sugar pumpkin and Connecticut Field pumpkin were published in Europe.

== Cultivation ==
Pumpkins are a warm-weather crop that is usually planted by early July in the Northern Hemisphere. Pumpkins require that soil temperatures 8 centimetres (3 in) deep are at least 15.5 °C (60 °F) and that the soil holds water well. Pumpkin crops may suffer if there is a lack of water, because of temperatures below 18 °C or 65 °F, or if grown in soils that become waterlogged. Within these conditions, pumpkins are considered hardy, and even if many leaves and portions of the vine are removed or damaged, the plant can quickly grow secondary vines to replace what was removed.

Pumpkins produce both a male and female flower, with fertilization usually performed by bees. In America, pumpkins have historically been pollinated by the native squash bee, Peponapis pruinosa, but that bee has declined, probably partly due to pesticide (imidacloprid) sensitivity. Ground-based bees, such as squash bees and the eastern bumblebee, are better suited to manage the larger pollen particles that pumpkins create. One hive per acre (0.4 hectares, or five hives per 2 hectares) is recommended by the U.S. Department of Agriculture. If there are inadequate bees for pollination, gardeners may have to hand pollinate. Inadequately pollinated pumpkins usually start growing but fail to develop.

=== Production ===
Pumpkin production 2024, millions of tonnes
India	9.3
China	7.7
Egypt	1.3
Russia	1.2
Ukraine	1.1
United States	0.9
World	34.6
Source: FAOSTAT of the United Nations

In 2024, world production of pumpkins (including squash and gourds) was 34.6 million tonnes, with India producing 27% and China 22% of the total (table).

==== In the United States ====
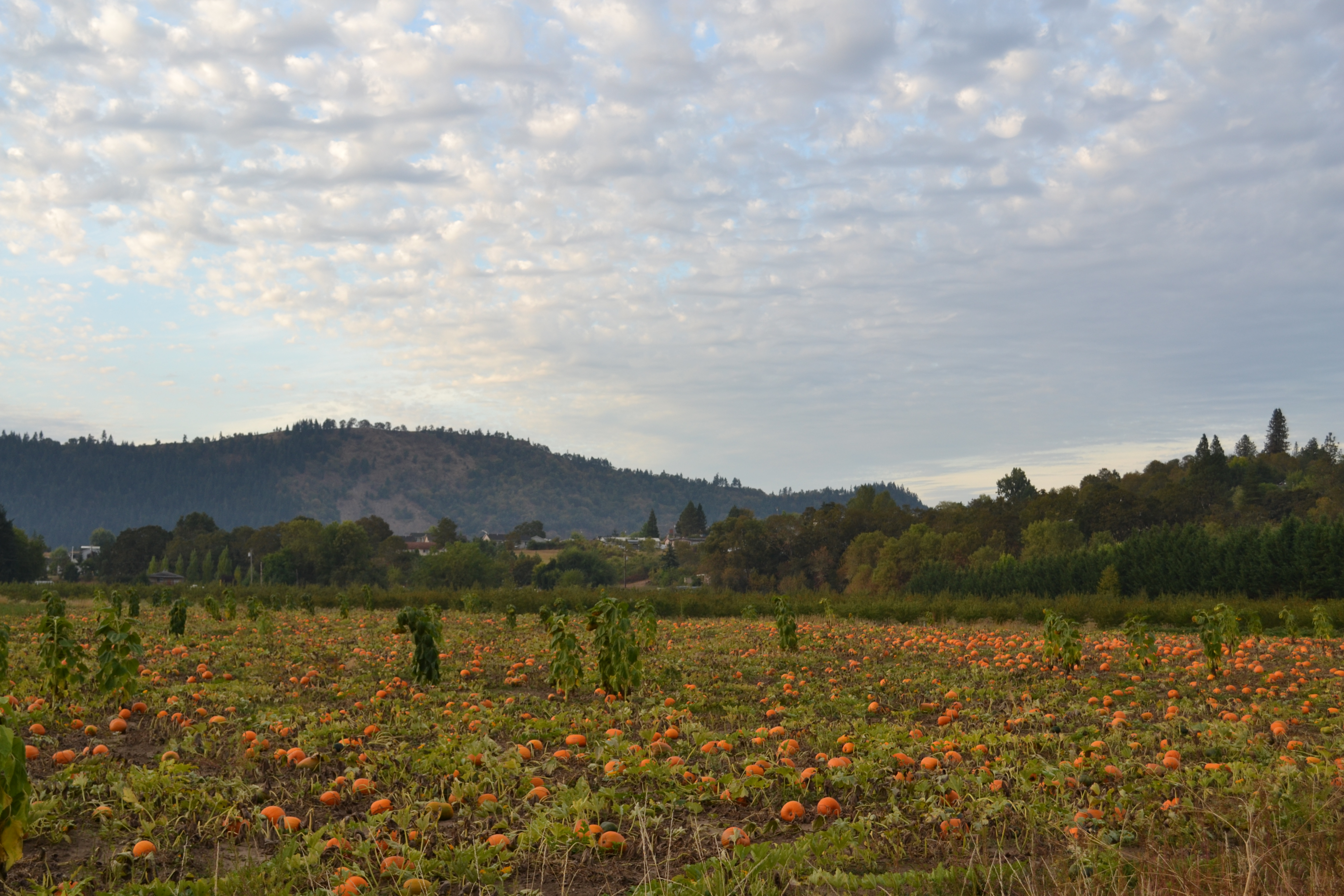
A pumpkin patch in Winchester, Oregon

As one of the most popular crops in the United States, in 2017 over 680 million kilograms (1.5 billion pounds) of pumpkins were produced. The top pumpkin-producing states include Illinois, Indiana, Ohio, Pennsylvania, and California. Pumpkin is the state squash of Texas.

According to the Illinois Department of Agriculture, 95 percent of the U.S. crop intended for processing is grown in Illinois. Indeed, 41 percent of the overall pumpkin crop for all uses originates in the state, more than five times that of the nearest competitor, California, whose pumpkin industry is centered in the San Joaquin Valley; and the majority of that comes from five counties in the central part of the state. Nestlé, operating under the brand name Libby's, produces 85 percent of the processed pumpkin in the United States at their plant in Morton, Illinois.

In the fall of 2009, rain in Illinois devastated the Libby's pumpkin crop, which, combined with a relatively weak 2008 crop depleting that year's reserves, resulted in a shortage affecting the entire country during the Thanksgiving holiday season. Another shortage, somewhat less severe, affected the 2015 crop.

The pumpkin crop in the western United States, which constitutes approximately three to four percent of the national crop, is grown primarily for the organic market. Terry County, Texas, has a substantial pumpkin industry, centered largely on miniature pumpkins. Illinois farmer Sarah Frey is called "the Pumpkin Queen of America" and sells around five million pumpkins annually, predominantly for use as Jack-o-lanterns.

== Nutrition ==
Pumpkin, raw
Nutritional value per 100 g (3.5 oz)
- Energy: 109 kJ (26 kcal)
- Carbohydrates: 6.5 g
- Sugars: 2.76 g
- Dietary fiber: 0.5 g
- Fat: 0.1 g
- Protein: 1 g
Vitamins and minerals
Vitamins	Quantity %DV^{†}
Vitamin A equiv. beta-Carotene lutein zeaxanthin	47% 426 μg 29% 3100 μg 1500 μg
Thiamine (B1)	4% 0.05 mg
Riboflavin (B2)	8% 0.11 mg
Niacin (B3)	4% 0.6 mg
Pantothenic acid (B5)	6% 0.298 mg
Vitamin B6	4% 0.061 mg
Folate (B9)	4% 16 μg
Vitamin C	10% 9 mg
Vitamin E	3% 0.44 mg
Vitamin K	1% 1.1 μg
Minerals	Quantity %DV^{†}
Calcium	2% 21 mg
Iron	4% 0.8 mg
Magnesium	3% 12 mg
Manganese	5% 0.125 mg
Phosphorus	4% 44 mg
Potassium	11% 340 mg
Sodium	0% 1 mg
Zinc	3% 0.32 mg
- Other constituents: Quantity
- Water: 91.6 g
- Link to USDA Database entry
- ^{†}Percentages estimated using US recommendations for adults, except for potassium, which is estimated based on expert recommendation from the National Academies.

In a 100-gram (3.5 oz) amount, raw pumpkin provides 110 kilojoules (26 kilocalories) of food energy and is an excellent source (20% or more the Daily Value, DV) of provitamin A beta-carotene and vitamin A (47% DV) (table). Vitamin C is present in moderate content (10% DV), but no other micronutrients are in significant amounts (less than 10% DV, table). Pumpkin is 92% water, 6.5% carbohydrate, 0.1% fat and 1% protein (table).

== Uses ==
=== Culinary ===
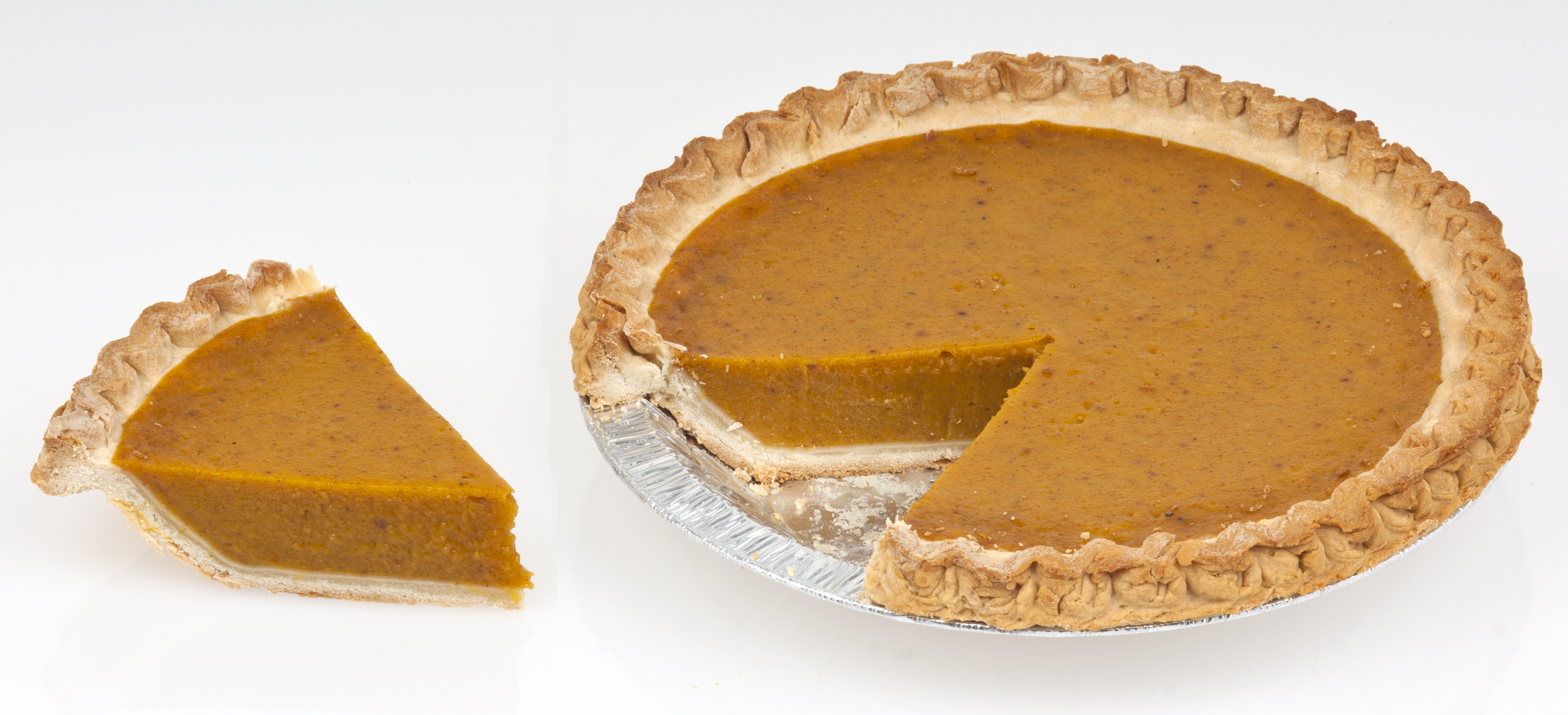
Pumpkin pie is a popular way of preparing pumpkin

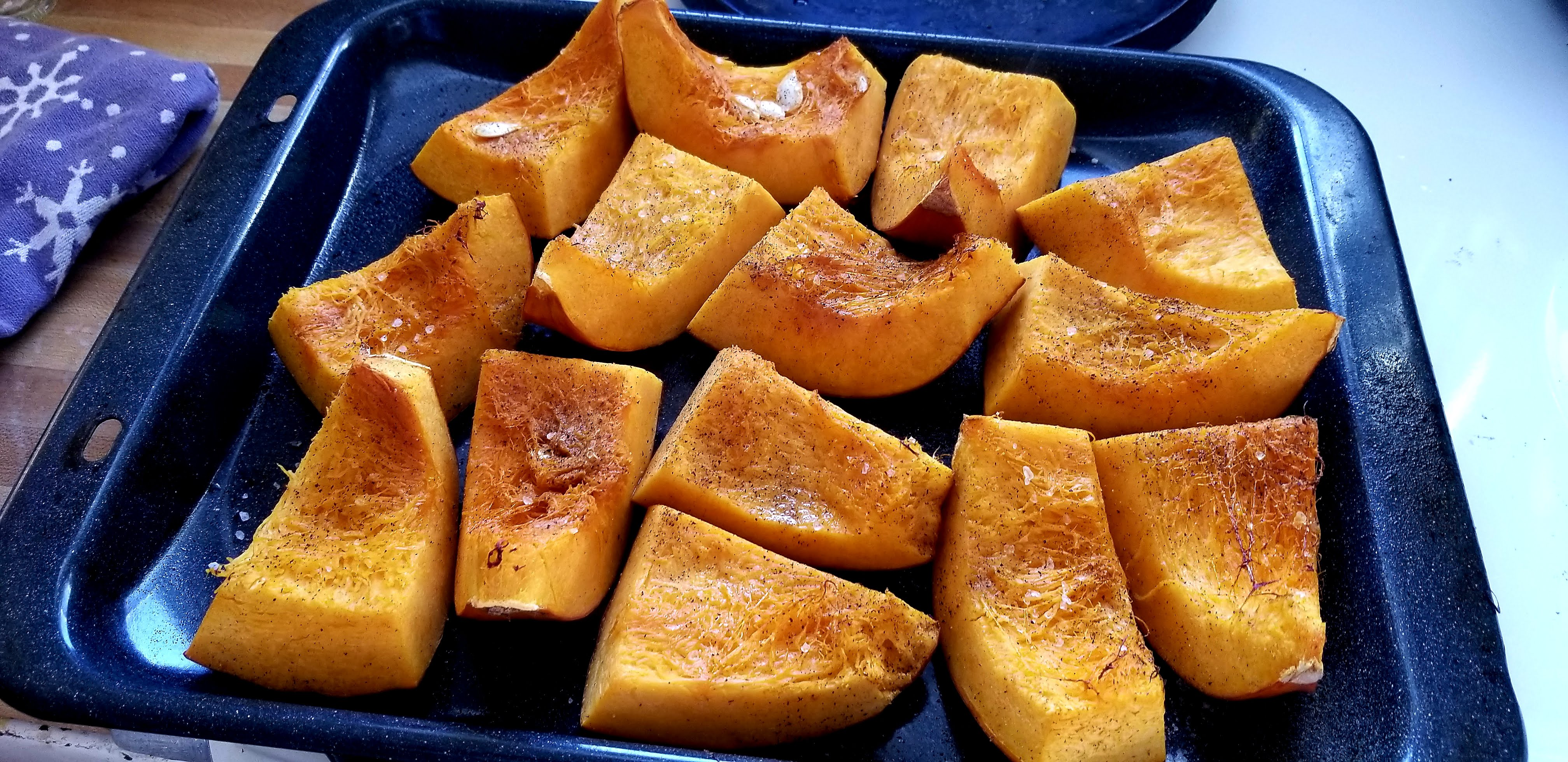
Roasted pumpkin

Most parts of the pumpkin plant are edible, including the fleshy shell, the seeds, the leaves, and the flowers. When ripe, the pumpkin can be boiled, steamed, or roasted.

==== Shell and flesh ====
In North America, the flesh of pumpkins is part of the traditional autumn harvest, eaten roasted, as mashed pumpkin and in soups and pumpkin bread. Pumpkin pie is a traditional staple of the Canadian and American Thanksgiving holidays. Pumpkin purée is sometimes prepared and frozen for later use.

The whole shell can be baked and used as a bowl for soup.

The skin (the tough, fibrous exterior) can be used to make a vegetable stock.

==== Flowers ====
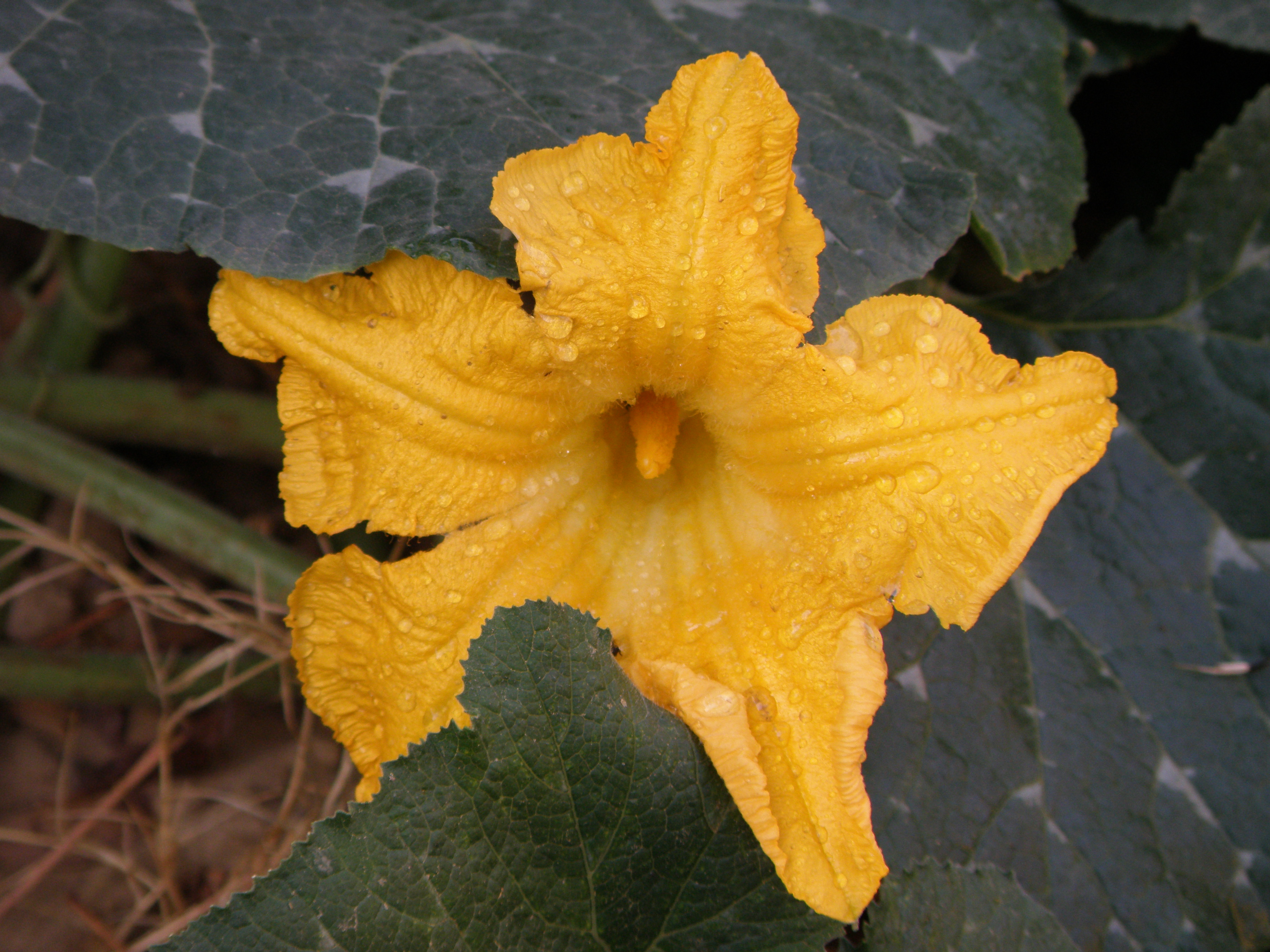
A pumpkin flower, an edible part of the plant

Pumpkin flowers are used as garnish and in salads.

==== Leaves ====
Leaves can be cooked in a stir fry, soup, or stew. Pumpkin leaves are also eaten in Zambia, where they are called chibwabwa and are boiled and cooked with groundnut paste as a side dish.

==== Seeds ====
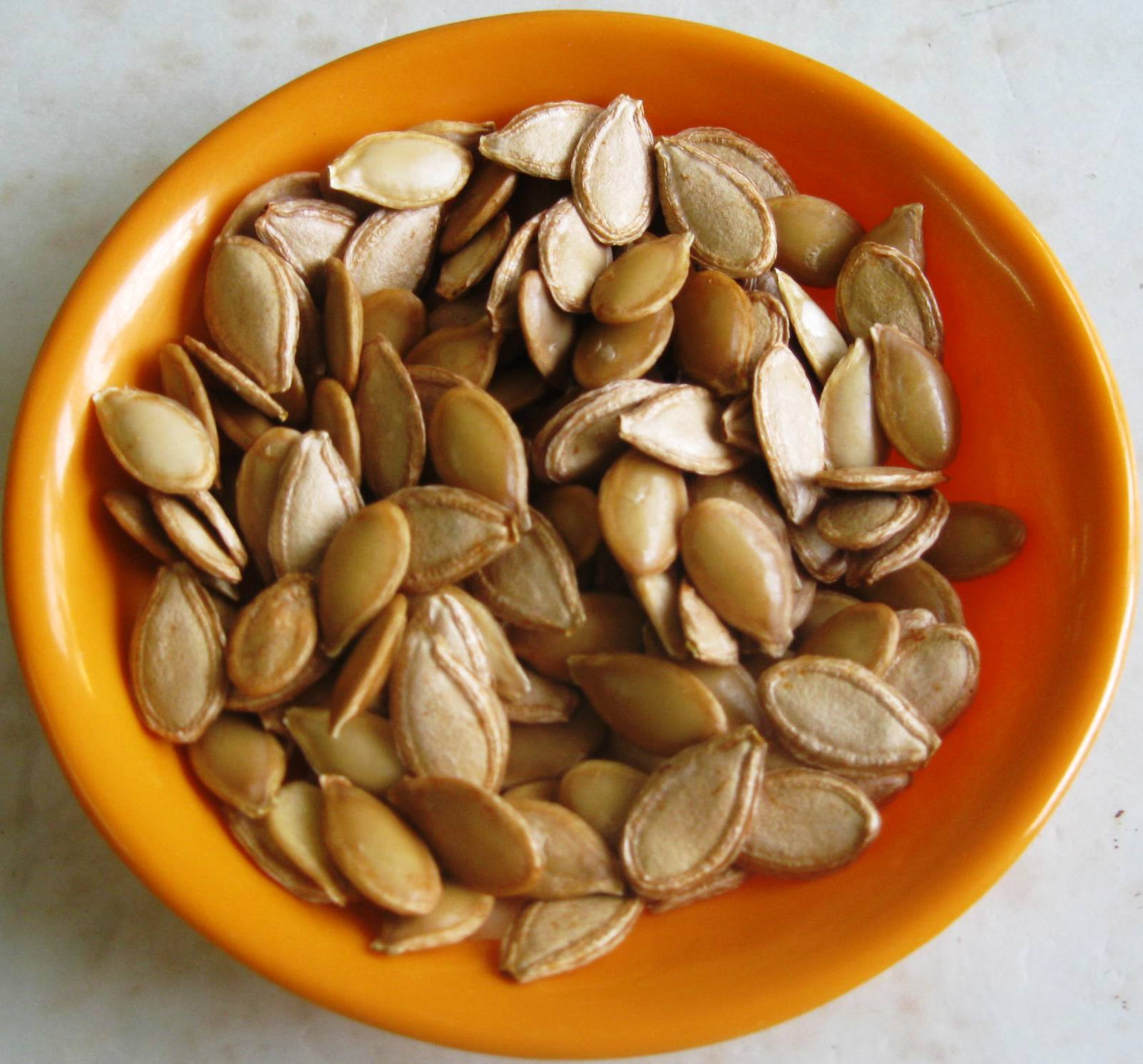
Roasted pumpkin seeds

Pumpkin seeds, also known as pepitas, are edible. They are about 1.5 cm (0.5 in) long, flat, asymmetrically oval, light green in color and usually covered by a white husk, although some pumpkin varieties produce seeds without them. Pumpkin seeds are a common snack when hulled, semi-hulled or roasted. Per typical serving, roasted pumpkin seeds are a rich source of protein, unsaturated fatty acids, and dietary minerals (roasted pumpkin seed nutrition).

==== Pumpkin seed oil ====
Pumpkin seed oil is a thick oil pressed from roasted seeds that appears red or green in color. When used for cooking or as a salad dressing, pumpkin seed oil is generally mixed with other oils because of its robust flavor. Pumpkin seed oil contains fatty acids such as oleic acid and alpha-linolenic acid.

=== Animal feed ===
Pumpkin seed meal from Cucurbita maxima and Cucurbita moschata have been demonstrated to improve the nutrition of eggs for human consumption, and Cucurbita pepo seed has successfully been used in place of soybean in chicken feed.

== Culture ==
=== Halloween ===
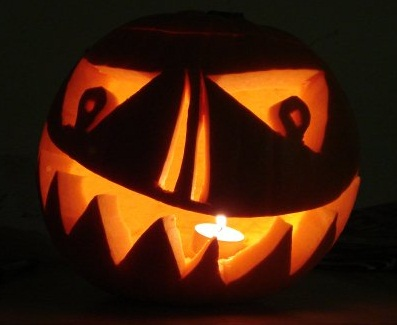
A pumpkin carved into a jack-o'-lantern for Halloween

In the United States, the carved pumpkin was first associated with the harvest season in general, long before it became an emblem of Halloween. The practice of carving produce for Halloween originated from an Irish myth about a man named "Stingy Jack". The practice of carving pumpkin jack-o'-lanterns for the Halloween season developed from a traditional practice in Ireland as well as Scotland and other parts of the United Kingdom of carving lanterns from the turnip, mangelwurzel, or swede (rutabaga). These vegetables continue to be popular choices today as carved lanterns in Scotland and Northern Ireland, although the British purchased a million pumpkins for Halloween in 2004 reflecting the spread of pumpkin carving in the United Kingdom.

Immigrants to North America began using the native pumpkins for carving, which are both readily available and much larger – making them easier to carve than turnips. Not until 1837 does jack-o'-lantern appear as a term for a carved vegetable lantern, and the carved pumpkin lantern association with Halloween is recorded in 1866.

The traditional American pumpkin used for jack-o-lanterns is the Connecticut field variety. Kentucky field pumpkin is also among the pumpkin cultivars grown specifically for jack-o-lantern carving.

=== Chunking ===
Pumpkin chunking is a competitive activity in which teams build various mechanical devices designed to throw a pumpkin as far as possible. Catapults, trebuchets, ballistas and air cannons are the most common mechanisms.

=== Pumpkin festivals and competitions ===
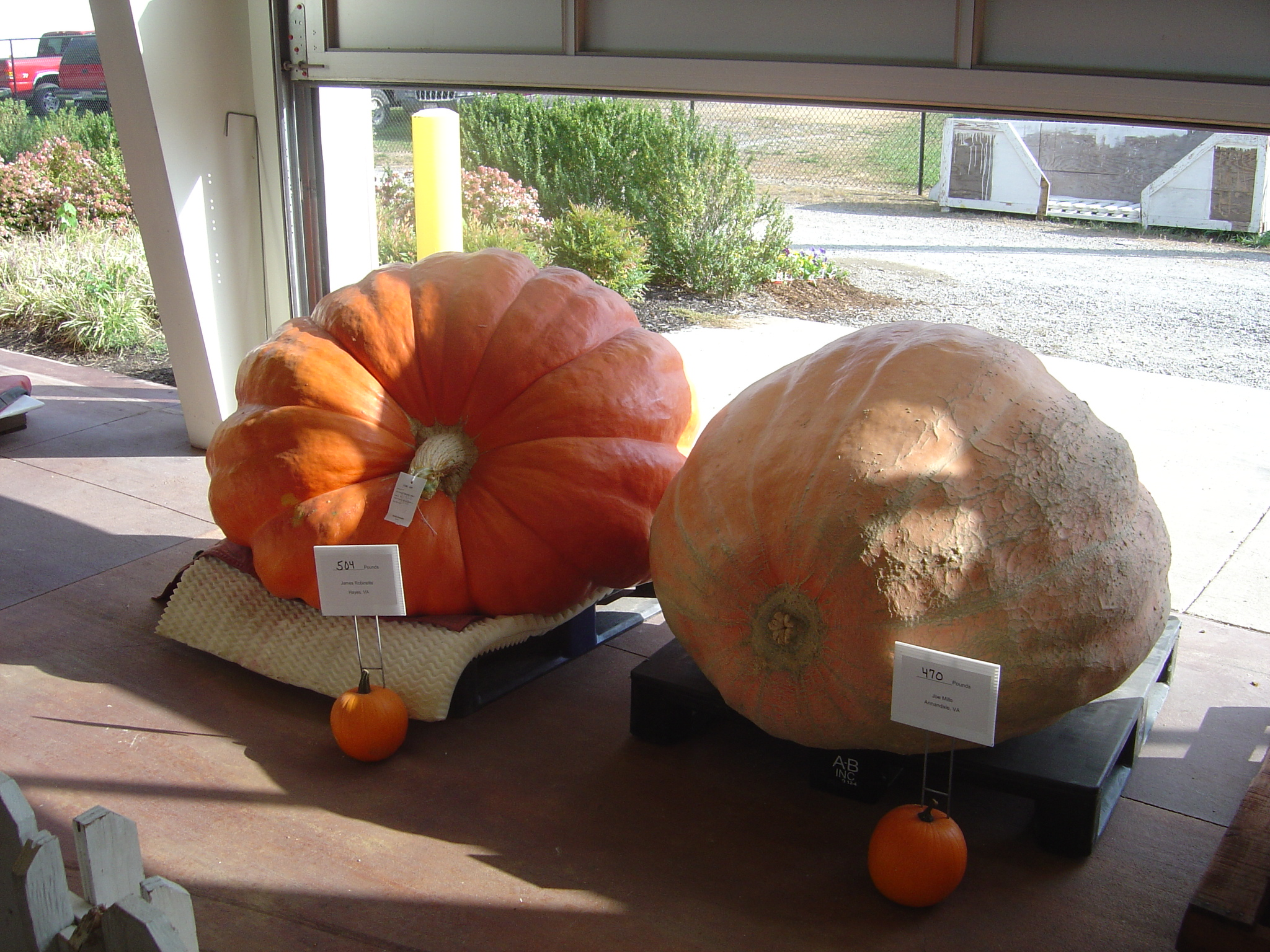
Giant Cucurbita maxima pumpkins

Growers of giant pumpkins often compete to grow the most massive pumpkins. Festivals may be dedicated to the pumpkin and these competitions. In the United States, the town of Half Moon Bay, California, holds an annual Art and Pumpkin Festival, including the World Champion Pumpkin Weigh-Off.

The record for the world's heaviest pumpkin, 1,247 kg (2,749 lb), was set in 2023 at the Half Moon Bay festival, 21 kg (46 lb) heavier than the previous record, set in Italy in 2021. In 2026, a Rhode Island pumpkin weighing 3,156 lb was "hailed by Guiness as the largest ever".

A festival called Pumpkin Weeks (Kurpitsaviikot) is held every October in Salo, Finland, at which thousands of different-sized pumpkins and carved jack-o'-lanterns are presented to tourists.

In Kashmir Al nov(alü nov) has been a festival celebrated with the harvest of pumpkins.

==== Folk medicine ====
Pumpkins have been used as folk medicine by Native Americans to treat intestinal worms and urinary ailments, and this Native American remedy was adopted by American doctors in the early nineteenth century as an anthelmintic for the expulsion of worms. In Germany and southeastern Europe, seeds of C. pepo were also used as folk remedies to treat irritable bladder and benign prostatic hyperplasia.

In China, C. moschata seeds were also used in traditional Chinese medicine for the treatment of the parasitic disease schistosomiasis and for the expulsion of tape worms.

=== Folklore and fiction ===
There is a connection in folklore and popular culture between pumpkins and the supernatural, such as:

- The custom of carving jack-o-lanterns from pumpkins derives from folklore about a lost soul wandering the earth.
- In the fairy tale Cinderella, the fairy godmother turns a pumpkin into a carriage for the title character, but at midnight it reverts to a pumpkin.
- In some adaptations of Washington Irving's ghost story The Legend of Sleepy Hollow, the headless horseman is said to use a pumpkin as a substitute head.
- In the Oz books, Jack Pumpkinhead is a character made of tree limbs. A pumpkin serves as his head; the seeds function as brains. The 23rd Oz book is Jack Pumpkinhead of Oz.

In most folklore the carved pumpkin is meant to scare away evil spirits on All Hallows' Eve (that is, Halloween), when the dead were purported to walk the earth.

=== Music ===
Vegetable orchestras, such as the London Vegetable Orchestra use zucchini trumpets, butternut squash trombones, pumpkin drums and aubergine castanets. Other vegetables played include carrots, bell peppers, potatoes and parsnips.

== Cultivars ==
The species and varieties include many economically important cultivars with a variety of different shapes, colors, and flavors that are grown for different purposes. Variety is used here interchangeably with cultivar, but not with species or taxonomic variety.

Image	Name	Species	Origin	Description
	Al Hachi	Cucurbita moschata	Kashmir	The people of Kashmir dry Al Hachi pumpkins to eat in the winter, when snowfall can isolate the valley.
	Big Max	Cucurbita maxima	United States	Big Max can exceed 100 pounds (45 kg) and 20 in (510 mm) in diameter under ideal growing conditions. The variety was hybridized for its size during the early 1960s. Individual fruits are round to slightly flattened.
	Calabaza	Cucurbita moschata	Cuba and West Indies	The calabaza is a variety originating in Cuba and the West Indies. It is also cultivated in the Philippines and United States.
	Cheese pumpkin	Cucurbita moschata	North America, possibly from an origin in Central America	So-called for its resemblance to a wheel of cheese, this cultivar has been noted for its long storage ability as well as relatively poor culinary characteristics. One of Duchesne's 1786 botanical illustrations depicts a fruit that has been identified with the Cheese Pumpkin.
	Connecticut field pumpkin	Cucurbita pepo	North America	Considered to be "one of the oldest pumpkins in existence". Widely used for autumn decorations, either whole or as jack-o'-lanterns.
	Dickinson pumpkin	Cucurbita moschata	North America	The oblong, ribbed fruits weigh up to 40 pounds and are widely used for canning. Derived from the Kentucky field pumpkin by Elijah Dickinson when he moved to Illinois in 1835. Libby's Select is classified either as a selection from the Dickinson Pumpkin or a selection from the same parent lineage.
	Dill's Atlantic Giant	Cucurbita maxima	North America	Dill's Atlantic Giant was bred by Howard Dill from sources including the Mammoth Pumpkin variety. The variety were patented in 1979, who then went on to set the giant pumpkin in 1980 with a 459 lb (208 kg) record.
	Galeux d'Eysines	Cucurbita maxima	France	The Galeux d'Eysines is mentioned in the Vilmorin-Andrieux vegetable catalogue Les Plantes Potagères in 1883. It is noted for peanut-sized growths on its skin, caused by a buildup of sugar. Its name may have originally been Brodé galeux d'Eysines, translating to embroidered with scabs, from Eysines. Immature pumpkins can be etched with words or designs that become warts as it matures. Galeux d'Eysines was reportedly brought to the United States in 1996 from the Foire aux Potirons pumpkin festival in Tranzault, France, by author Amy Goldman.
	Japanese pie pumpkin	Cucurbita argyrosperma	Pennsylvania	The Japanese pie pumpkin is so-called because its seeds become crazed, resembling to Americans the appearance of Chinese characters or Japanese kanji. This variety was introduced by Samuel Wilson of Pennsylvania in 1884.
	Jarrahdale pumpkin	Cucurbita maxima	Australia	A variety with a blue-gray skin, named after the Western Australian town of Jarrahdale. The Jarrahdale closely resembles the Queensland Blue. It cuts easily, and has orange, sweet-tasting flesh.
	Jonathan pumpkin	Cucurbita argyrosperma		Available commercially as early as 1891 from Livingston Seed. The name Jonathan may originate as a form of melioration against the character of Brother Jonathan which was sometimes used as mocking personification of the United States by satirists in Europe. Brother Jonathan was also used within the United States either as characterizing the epitome of thrift and industriousness, or an unsophisticated bumpkin.
	Kabocha	Cucurbita maxima	Japan	Kabocha is the general Japanese word for winter squashes. In English, the term "kabocha" is usually used for a green-skinned cultivar derived from buttercup squash.
	Kentucky field pumpkin	Cucurbita moschata	Cuba, Mexico, or the United States	Kentucky field pumpkin is among the pumpkin cultivars grown specifically for jack-o-lantern carving. It has been classified as part of a group of Cucurbita moschata cultivars historically grown by the Seminole people of the United States southeast, as well as by farmers in Louisiana, Alabama, and Mississippi. Similar cultivars were identified in Cuba as well as coastal and southern Mexico.
	Musquée de Provence, Moscata di Provenza or fairytale pumpkin	Cucurbita moschata	France	A large pumpkin from France with sweet, fragrant, deep-orange flesh often sold by the slice due to its size.
	Seminole pumpkin	Cucurbita moschata	Florida	A landrace originally cultivated by the Seminole people of what is now Florida. Naturalists in the 18th century recorded Seminole pumpkins growing with their vines hanging from trees.
	Styrian pumpkin	Cucurbita pepo	Styria	Styrian pumpkins (Cucurbita pepo subsp. pepo var. styriaca or var. oleifera) have hull-less seeds, which are used in Austria and Slovenia as part of a pumpkin seed oil industry that presses their roasted seeds.
	Sugar pumpkin	Cucurbita pepo	North America	The sugar pumpkin is one of the earliest varieties of pumpkin documented by European colonists upon arrival in North America. It has sweeter flesh than the similar but larger Connecticut Field pumpkin from which sugar pumpkins may have been selected.

== See also ==
- List of culinary fruits
- List of squash and pumpkin dishes
