= Cashaw =

Cashaw is a vernacular name for several plants. The term is derived from the colloquial English dialects, in particular Jamaican patois. It can refer to:

- Certain algarrobo, bayahonda and mesquite trees (Prosopis species) in the Fabaceae
- Anacardium occidentale, or cashew, in the Anacardiaceae
- Acacia farnesiana, or needle bush, in the Fabaceae
- Cucurbita argyrosperma, or cushaw, in the Cucurbitaceae
