= Butternut squash =

Cucurbita moschata; type of winter squash

Cucurbita moschata 'Butternut'
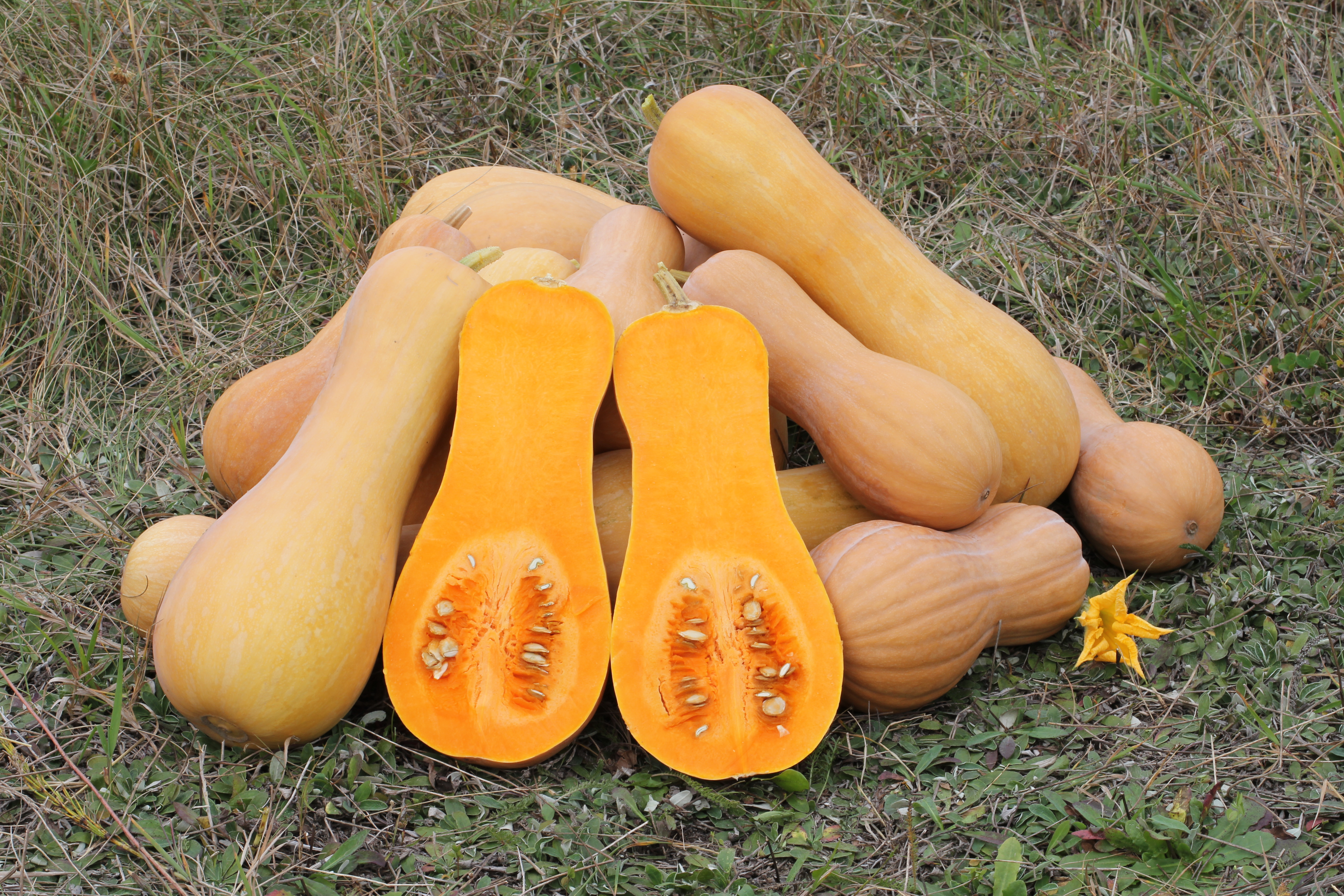
- Ripe butternut squash
- Species: Cucurbita moschata
- Hybrid parentage: 'Gooseneck squash' × 'Hubbard squash'
- Breeder: Charles Leggett
- Origin: 1940s in Stow, Massachusetts, United States

Butternut squash (a variety of Cucurbita moschata), known in Australia and New Zealand as butternut pumpkin or gramma, is a type of winter squash that grows on a vine. It has a sweet, nutty taste, when cooked, similar to that of a pumpkin. It has tan-yellow skin and orange fleshy pulp with a compartment of seeds in the blossom end. When ripening, the flesh turns increasingly deep orange due to its rich content of beta-carotene, a provitamin A compound.

Although botanically a fruit (specifically, a berry), butternut squash is used culinarily as a vegetable that can be roasted, sautéed, puréed for soups such as squash soup, or mashed to be used in casseroles, breads, muffins, and pies. It is part of the same squash family as ponca, waltham, pumpkin, and calabaza.

== History ==
Stages of development of butternut squash

The word squash comes from the Narragansett word askutasquash, meaning "eaten raw or uncooked", and 'butternut' from the squash's nutty flavor. Although American native peoples may have eaten some forms of squash without cooking, today most squash is eaten cooked.

Before the arrival of Europeans, C. moschata had been carried over all parts of North America where it could be grown, but butternut squash is a modern variety of winter squash. It was developed by Charles Leggett of Stow, Massachusetts, who, in 1944, crossed pumpkin and gooseneck squash varieties.

== Nutrition ==
Butternut squash, baked
Nutritional value per 100 g (3.5 oz)
- Energy: 167 kJ (40 kcal)
- Carbohydrates: 10.5 g
- Dietary fiber: 3.2 g
- Fat: 0.1 g
- Protein: 0.9 g
Vitamins and minerals
Vitamins	Quantity %DV^{†}
Vitamin A equiv. beta-Carotene	62% 558 μg 42% 4570 μg
Thiamine (B1)	6% 0.07 mg
Riboflavin (B2)	1% 0.017 mg
Niacin (B3)	6% 0.98 mg
Pantothenic acid (B5)	7% 0.36 mg
Vitamin B6	7% 0.124 mg
Folate (B9)	5% 19 μg
Vitamin C	17% 15 mg
Vitamin E	9% 1.29 mg
Minerals	Quantity %DV^{†}
Calcium	3% 41 mg
Iron	3% 0.6 mg
Magnesium	7% 29 mg
Manganese	7% 0.17 mg
Phosphorus	2% 27 mg
Potassium	9% 284 mg
Zinc	1% 0.13 mg
- Other constituents: Quantity
- Water: 87.8 g
- Link to USDA Database entry
- ^{†}Percentages estimated using US recommendations for adults, except for potassium, which is estimated based on expert recommendation from the National Academies.

Baked butternut squash is 88% water, 11% carbohydrates, 1% protein, and contains negligible fat (table). In a reference amount of 100 grams (3.5 oz), it supplies 167 kilojoules (40 kilocalories) of food energy, and is a rich source (20% or more of the Daily Value, DV) of vitamin A (62% DV), with a moderate content of vitamin C (17% DV) (table).

== Uses ==
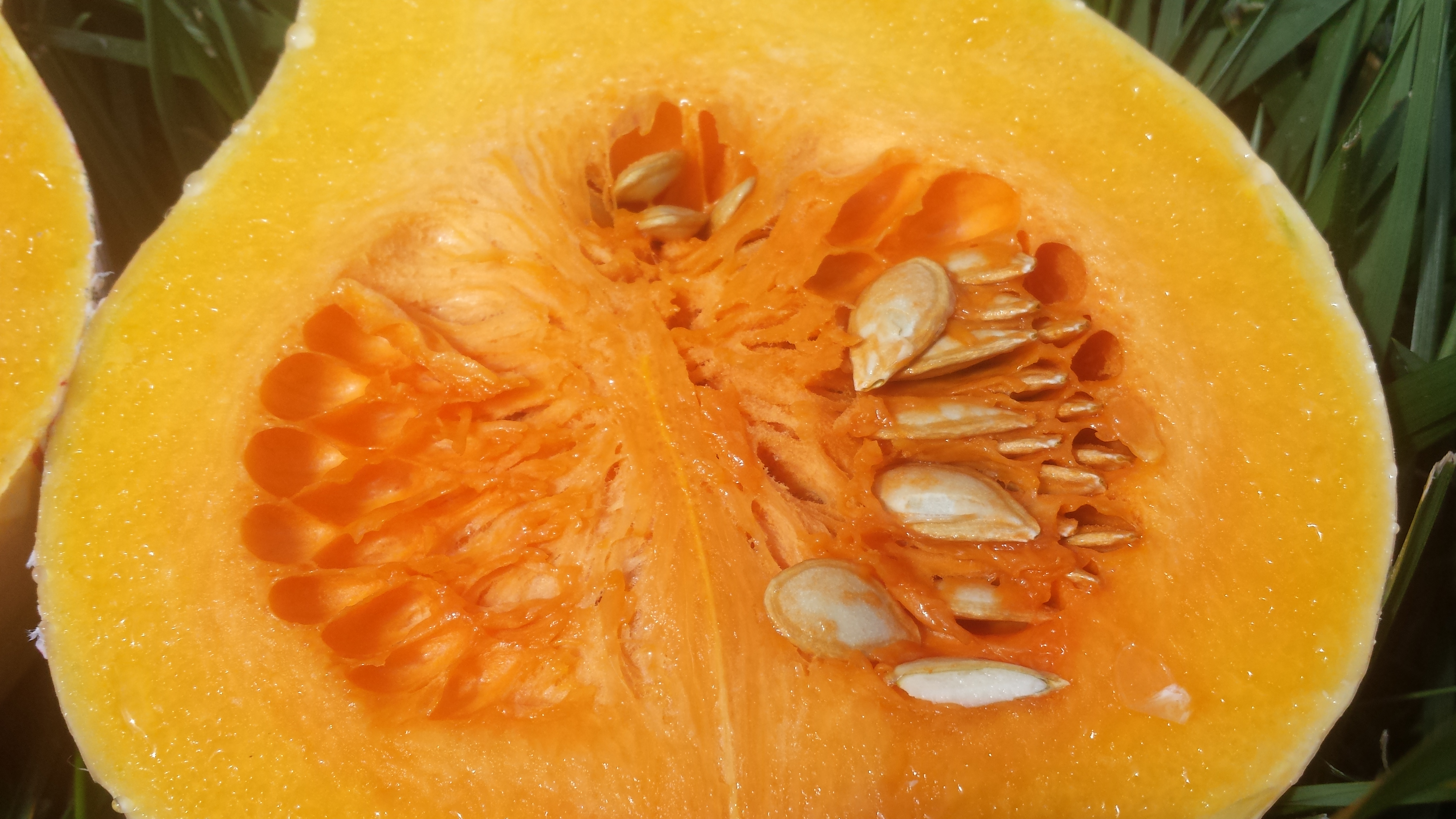
Butternut squash cut lengthwise showing seeds

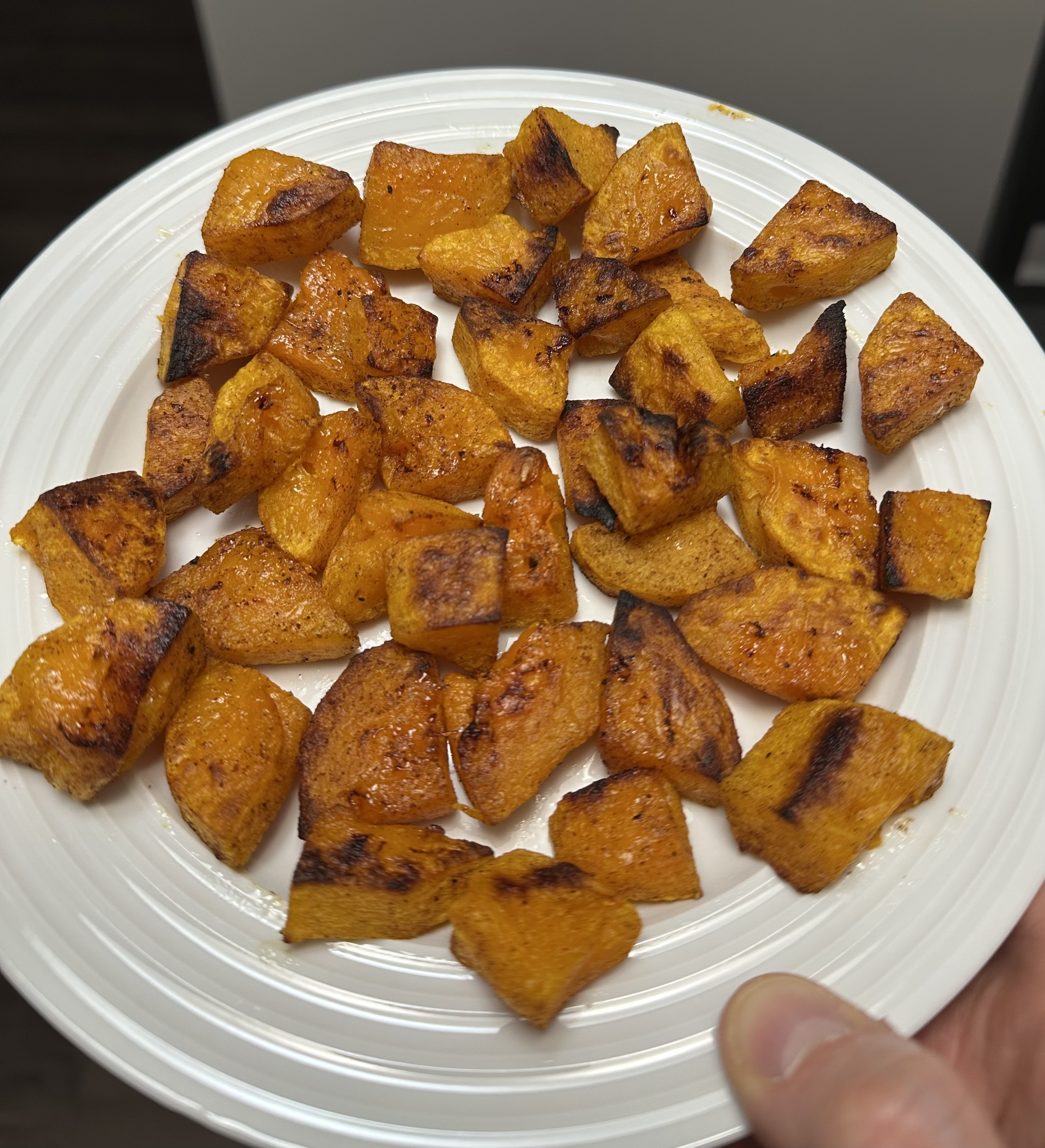
Plate of diced, roasted butternut squash

=== Storage ===
The optimal eating period of butternut squash is 3–6 months after harvest. They are best kept at 10 °C (50 °F) with 50 percent humidity. For the best flavor, butternut squash should be left to cure for two months after harvest.

=== Culinary ===
One of the most common ways to prepare butternut squash is baking. Once cooked, it can be eaten in a variety of ways. The fruit is prepared by removing the skin, stalk, and seeds, which are not usually eaten or cooked. However, the seeds are edible, either raw or roasted, and the skin is also edible and softens when roasted. The seeds can even be roasted and pressed into an oil to create butternut squash seed oil. This oil can be used for roasting, cooking, on popcorn, or as a salad dressing.

In Australia and Bulgaria, it is regarded as a pumpkin, and is used interchangeably with other types of pumpkin.

In South Africa, butternut squash is commonly used and often prepared as a soup or grilled whole. Grilled butternut is typically seasoned with nutmeg and cinnamon or stuffed (with, for example, spinach and feta) before being wrapped in foil and grilled. Grilled butternut is often served as a side dish to braais (barbecues) and the soup as a starter dish.

Butternuts were introduced commercially in New Zealand in the 1950s by brothers Arthur and David Harrison, nursery workers, and Otaki market gardeners.

== Music ==
Vegetable orchestras, such as the London Vegetable Orchestra, use zucchini trumpets, butternut squash trombones, pumpkin drums and aubergine castanets.

== See also ==
- Acorn squash
- Calabaza
- Kabocha
- Spaghetti squash
