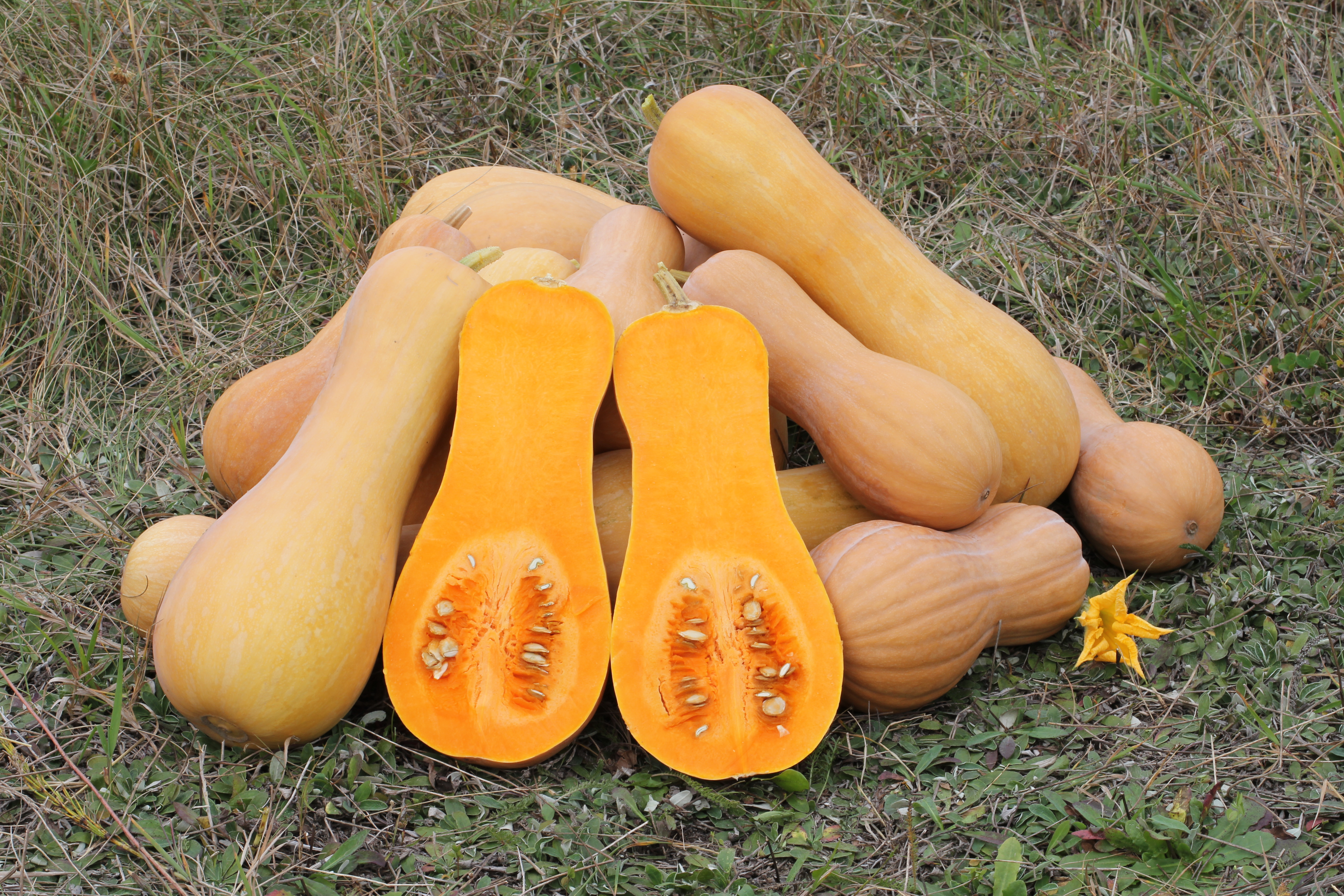
- Butternut squash, a variety of Cucurbita moschata

Scientific classification
- Kingdom: Plantae
- Clade: Embryophytes
- Clade: Tracheophytes
- Clade: Angiosperms
- Clade: Eudicots
- Clade: Rosids
- Order: Cucurbitales
- Family: Cucurbitaceae
- Genus: Cucurbita
- Species: C. moschata

Binomial name
- Cucurbita moschata Duchesne

Synonyms
- Cucurbita colombiana (Zhit.) Bukasov; Cucurbita hippopera Ser.; Cucurbita macrocarpa Gasp.; Cucurbita meloniformis Carrière; Cucurbita pepo var. moschata Duchesne; Gymnopetalum calyculatum Miq.; Pepo moschata (Duchesne) Britton

= Cucurbita moschata =

Species of flowering plant

Cucurbita moschata is a species originating in the tropical Americas which is cultivated for edible flesh, flowers, greens, and seeds. It includes cultivars known in English as squash or pumpkin. Cultivars of C. moschata are generally more tolerant of hot, humid weather than squash of other domesticated species. C. moschata also exhibit a greater resistance to certain disease and insects, notably including to the squash vine borer. Commercially-made pumpkin pie mix is most often made from varieties of C. moschata.

== History ==
All species of squashes and pumpkins are native to the Western Hemisphere, and the ancestral members of the genus Cucurbita were present in the Americas before humans. Squash are important food plants of the original people of the region, ranking next to maize and beans in many precolonial American economies.

In the modern era, C. moschata has been one of the most widely cultivated Cucurbita in the tropics. Even so, it has been proposed that production statistics do not reflect its true proliferation because it is often grown on a small-scale basis for local consumption. The greatest diversity among C. moschata populations can be found in the tropical Americas, suggesting a center of origin in that region. Various areas have been proposed for the origin, with one recent candidate area in northwestern South America.

== Systematics ==
No modern Cucurbita species is considered fully genetically isolated and C. moschata can be hybridized with any other species in the genus. It has been suggested that this shows that the species of Cucurbita have diversified more recently than those of related genera such as Cucumis and Citrullus.

Historically, varieties of cushaw squash now classified as Cucurbita argyrosperma were assigned to Cucurbita moschata. A small number of C. moschata varieties are still commonly known as cushaws. Genetic research indicates that, while distinct species, C. argyrosperma and C. moschata are closely related.

=== Cultivars ===
Variety is used here interchangeably with cultivar, but not with species or taxonomic variety.

- Al Hachi – a winter squash used in Kashmir, usually dried
- Aehobak – a summer squash, also called Korean zucchini
- Brazilian crook neck, Abóbora de pescoço or Abóbora seca – a large, curved-neck variety with deep orange flesh and dark green skin with light orange highlights found in Brazil.
- Butternut squash – a popular winter squash in much of North America, Europe and South Africa.
- Calabaza – a commonly grown winter squash in the Caribbean, tropical America, and the Philippines
- Dickinson pumpkin – Libby's uses a proprietary strain of Dickinson for its canned pumpkin
- Giromon – a large, green cultivar, grown primarily in the Caribbean. Haitians use it to make the traditional "soupe giromon".
- Golden Cushaw – Similar in shape but a different species than the common Cucurbita argyrosperma "cushaw" type.
- Loche – a landrace of squashes from Peru.
- Liscia – grows early in the season, reaching maturation after 115 to 130 days
- Long Island cheese pumpkin – the exterior resembles a wheel of cheese in shape, color, and texture
- Musquée de Provence, Moscata di Provenza or Fairytale pumpkin – a large hybrid from France with sweet, fragrant, deep-orange flesh often sold by the slice due to its size.
- Naples long squash or Courge pleine de Naples – a large, long squash with deep green skin and small bulb at the end. It is 10 to 25 kg on average and found in France and Italy
- São Paulo pumpkin or Abóbora paulista is a butternut-shaped variety with well-defined white and green stripes along its length
- Seminole pumpkin – an heirloom variety originally cultivated by the Seminole people of what is now Florida
- Tromboncino – a summer squash, also known as "Zucchetta"

== Gallery ==
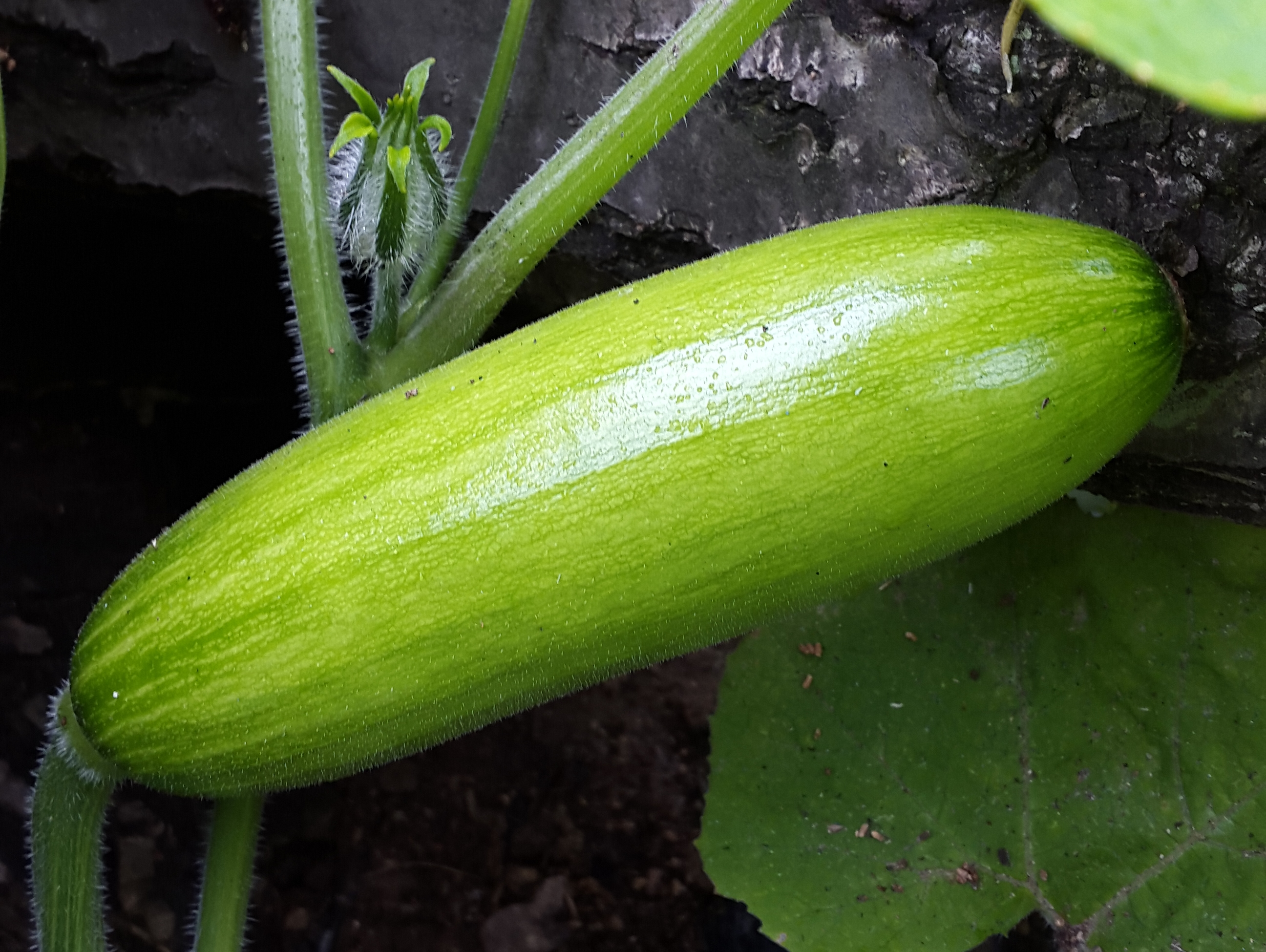
Aehobak or "Korean zucchini"

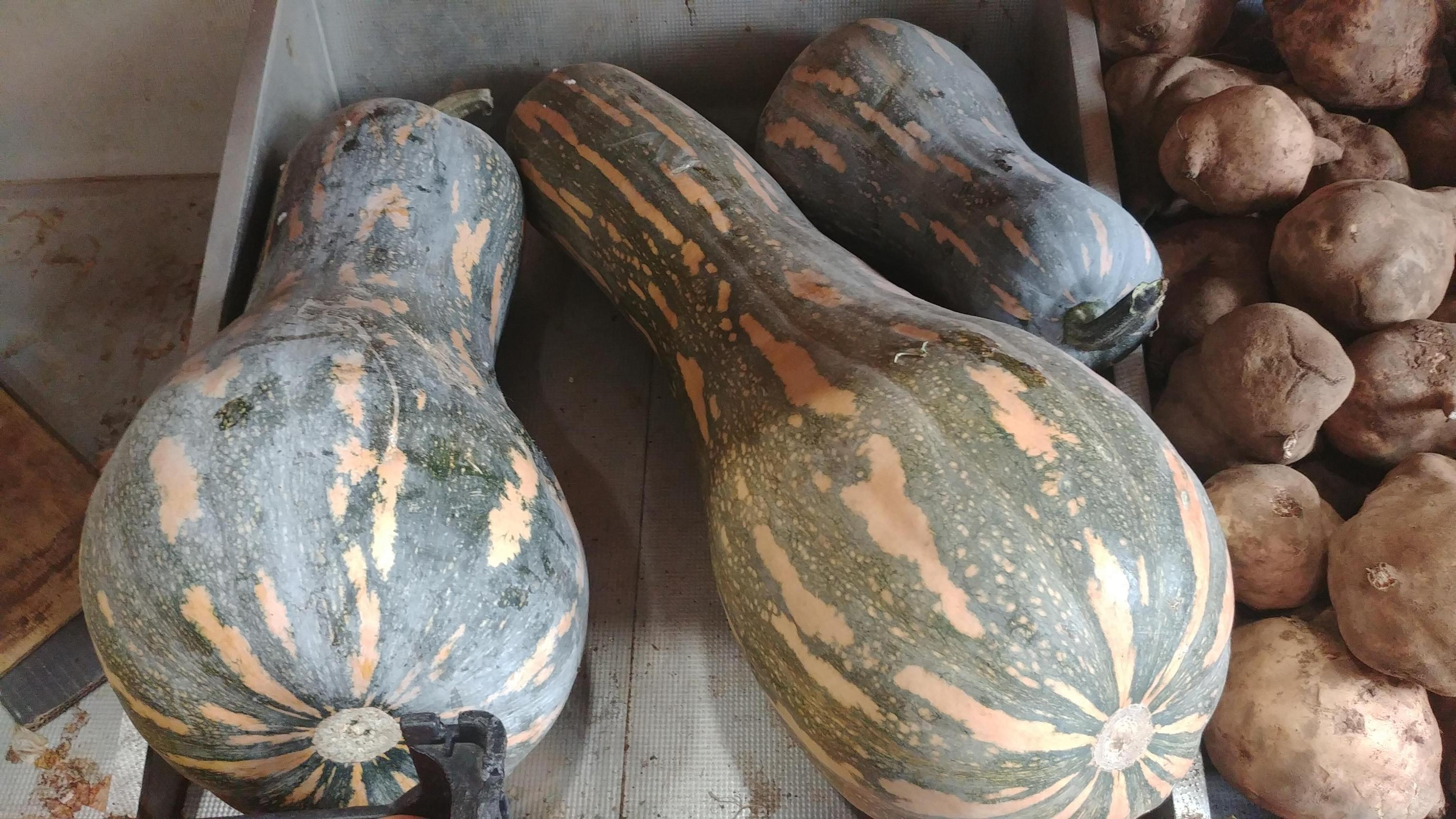
Brazilian crook neck or Abóbora de pescoço

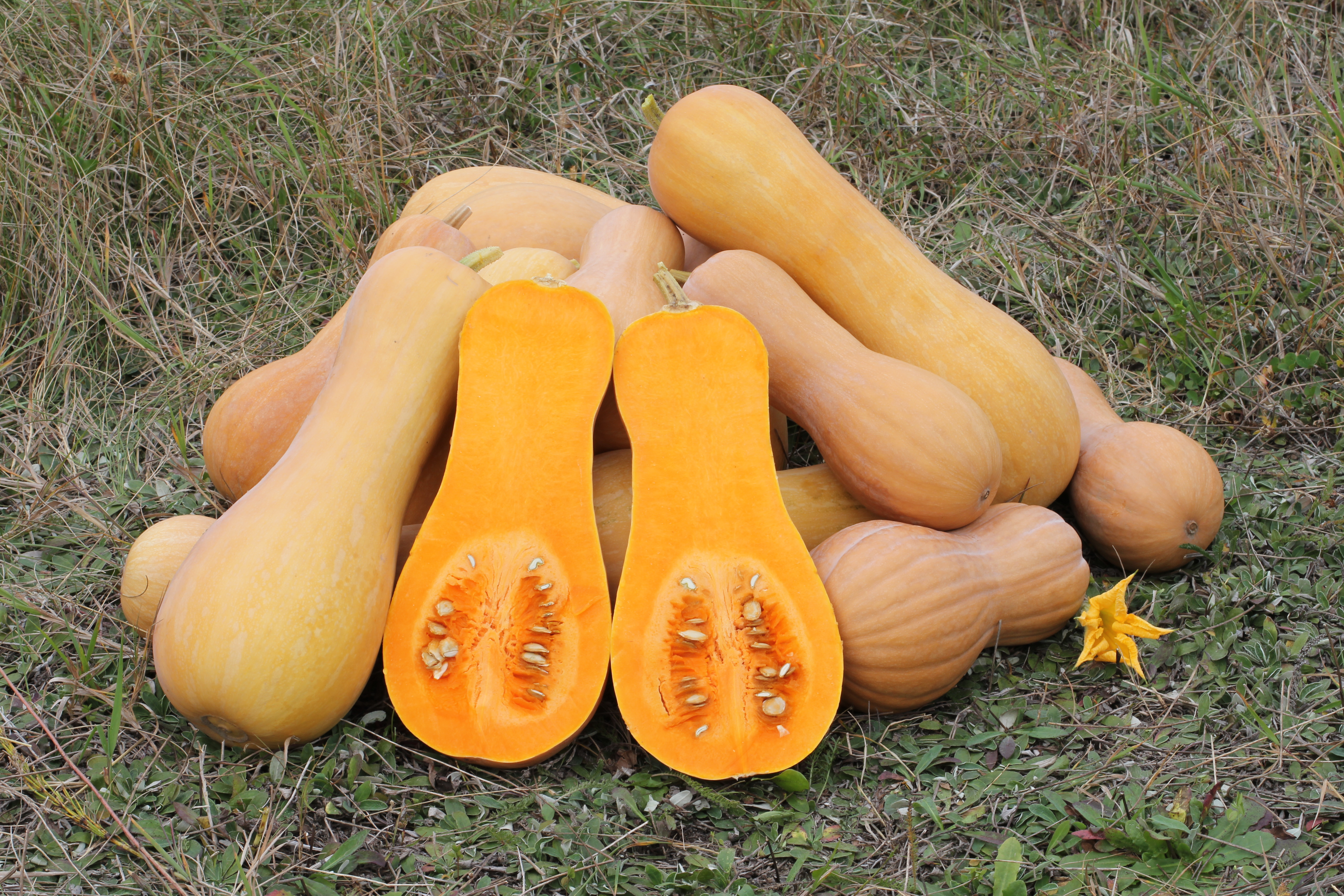
Butternut squash

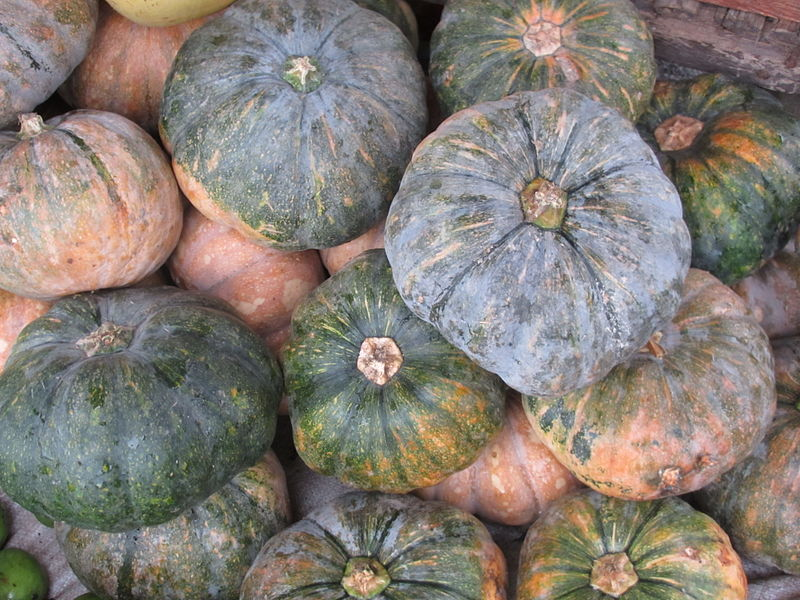
Calabaza

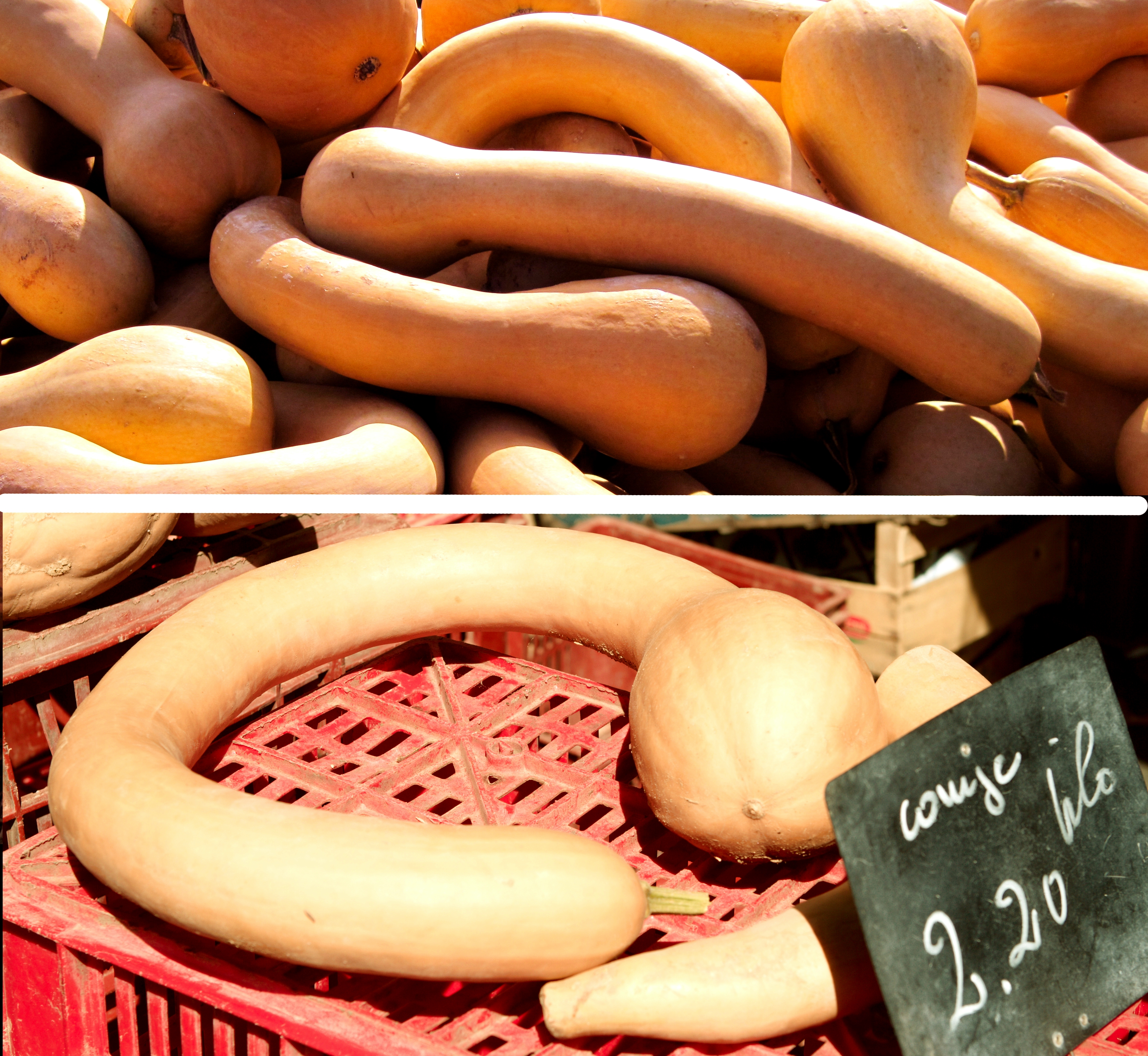
Trombetta

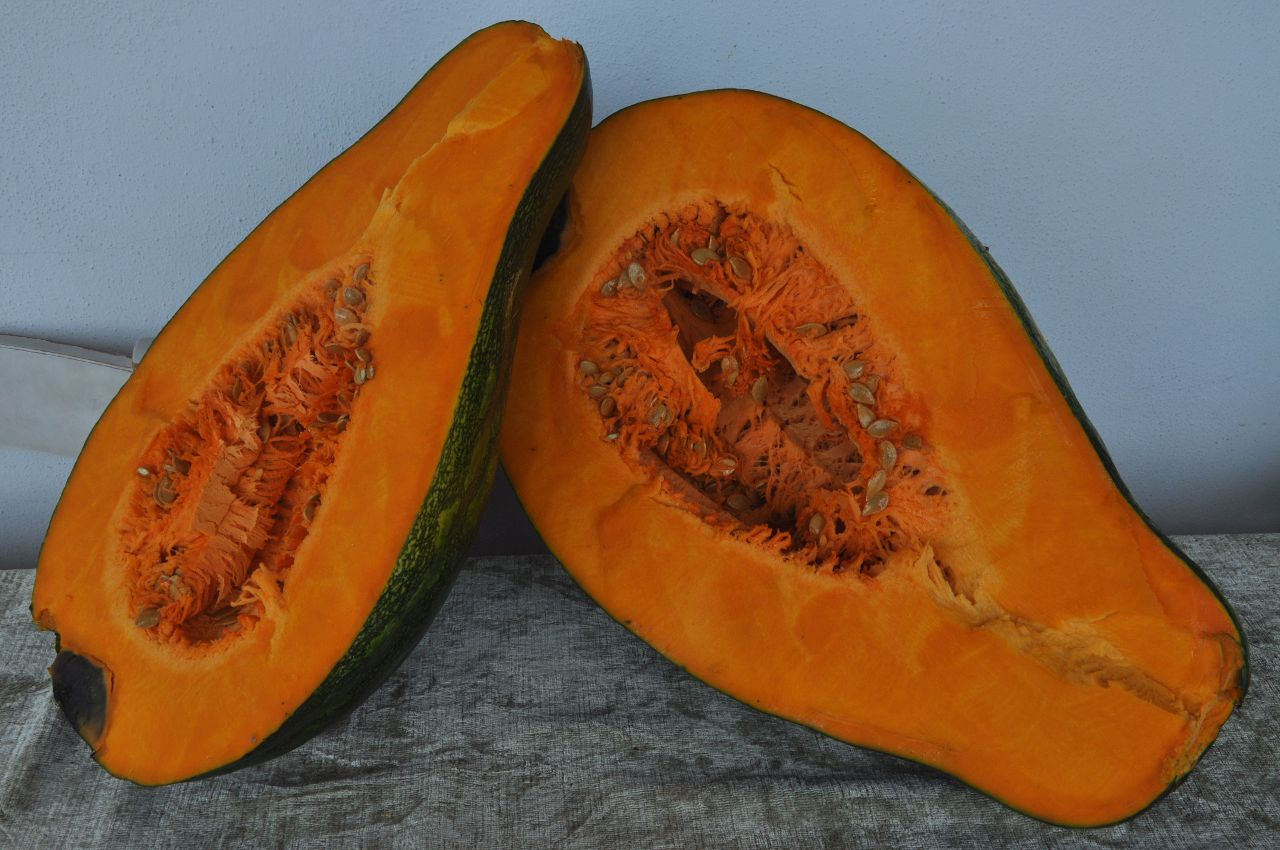
Giromon

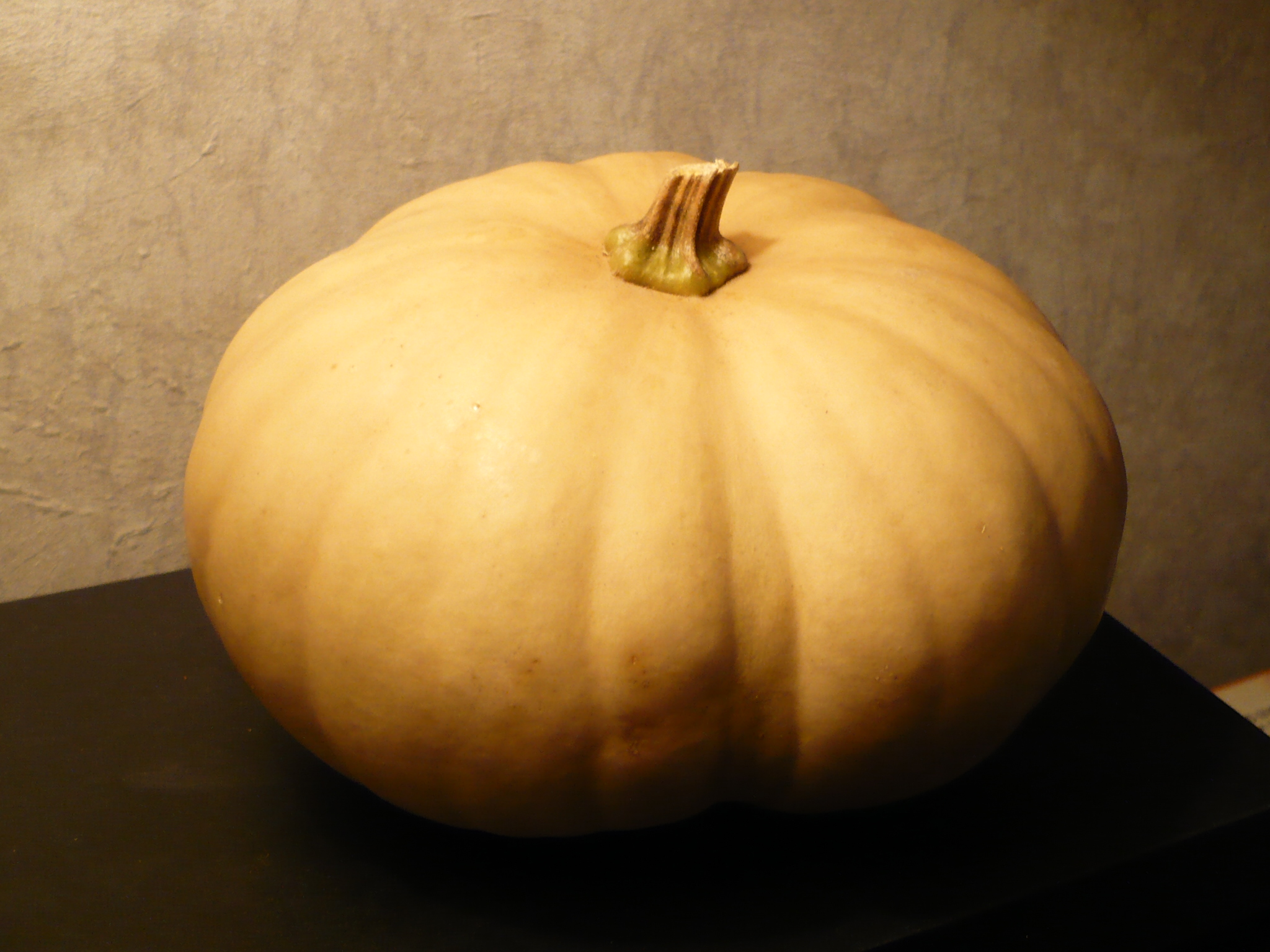
Long Island cheese pumpkin

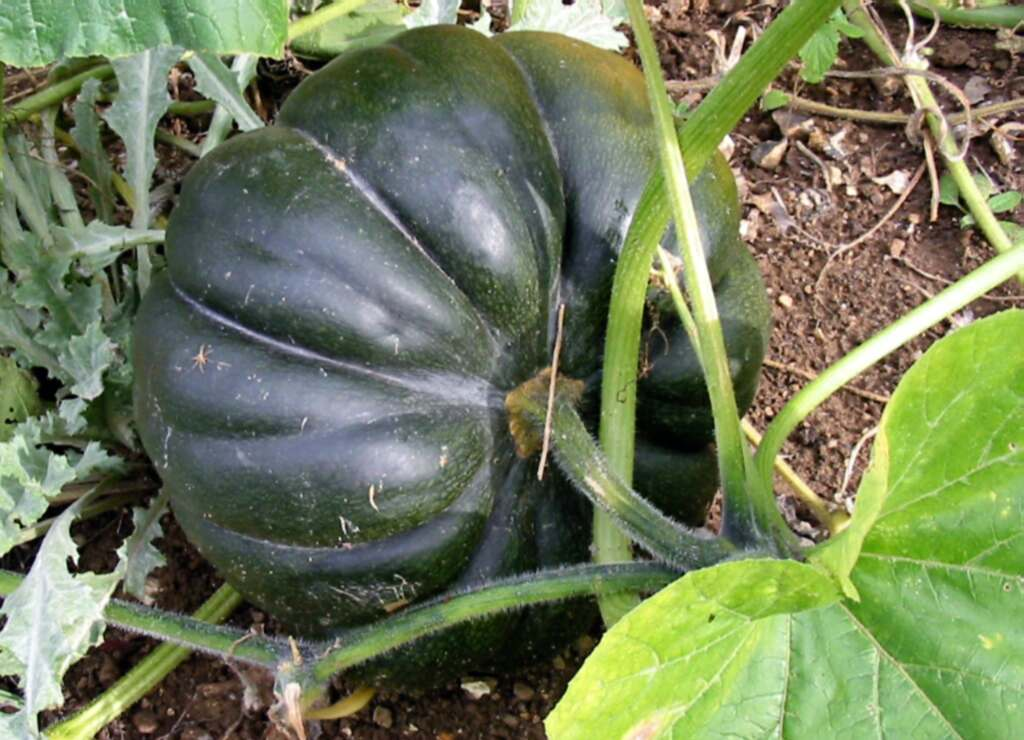
Musquée de Provence (young)

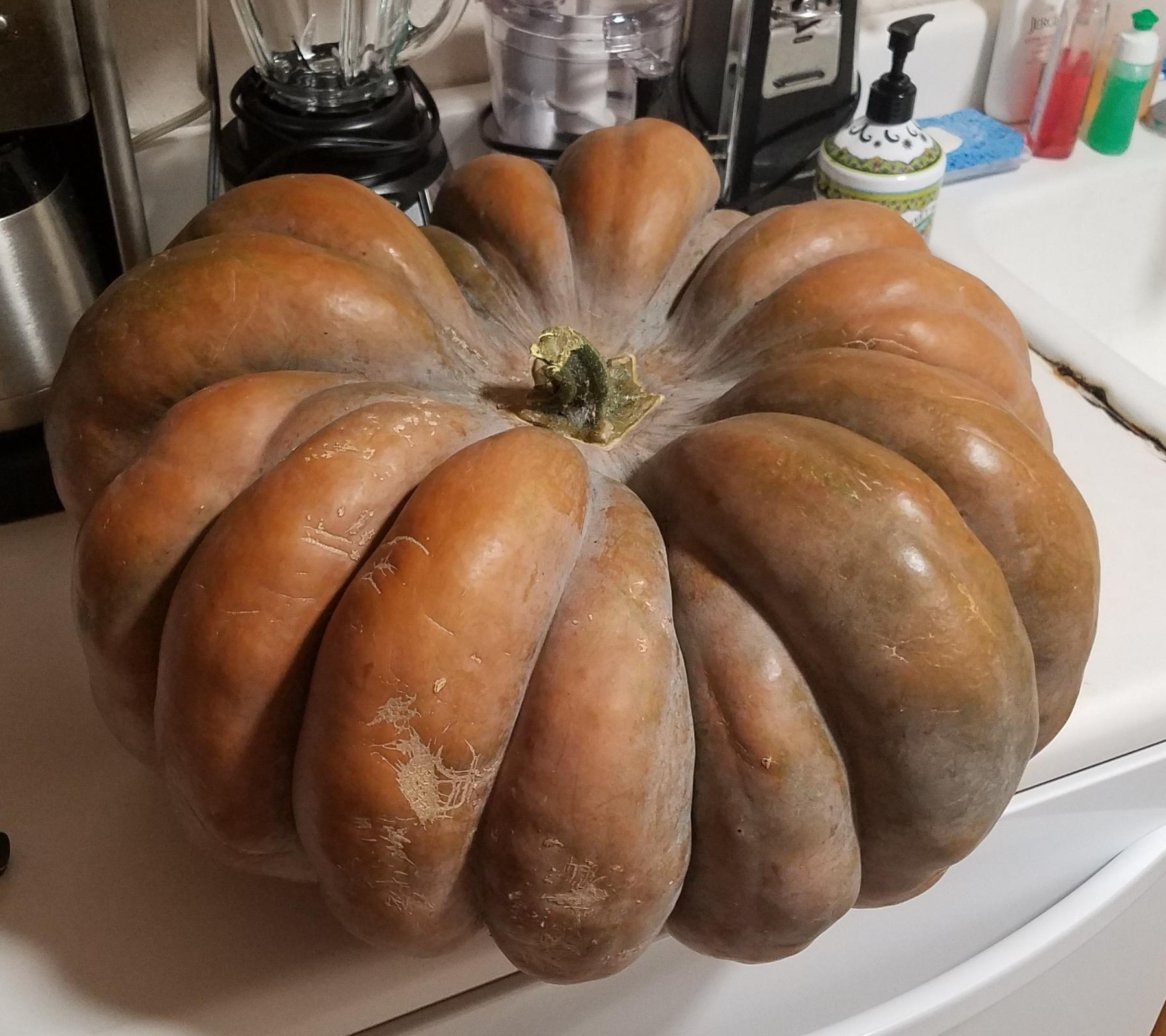
Musquée de Provence (mature)

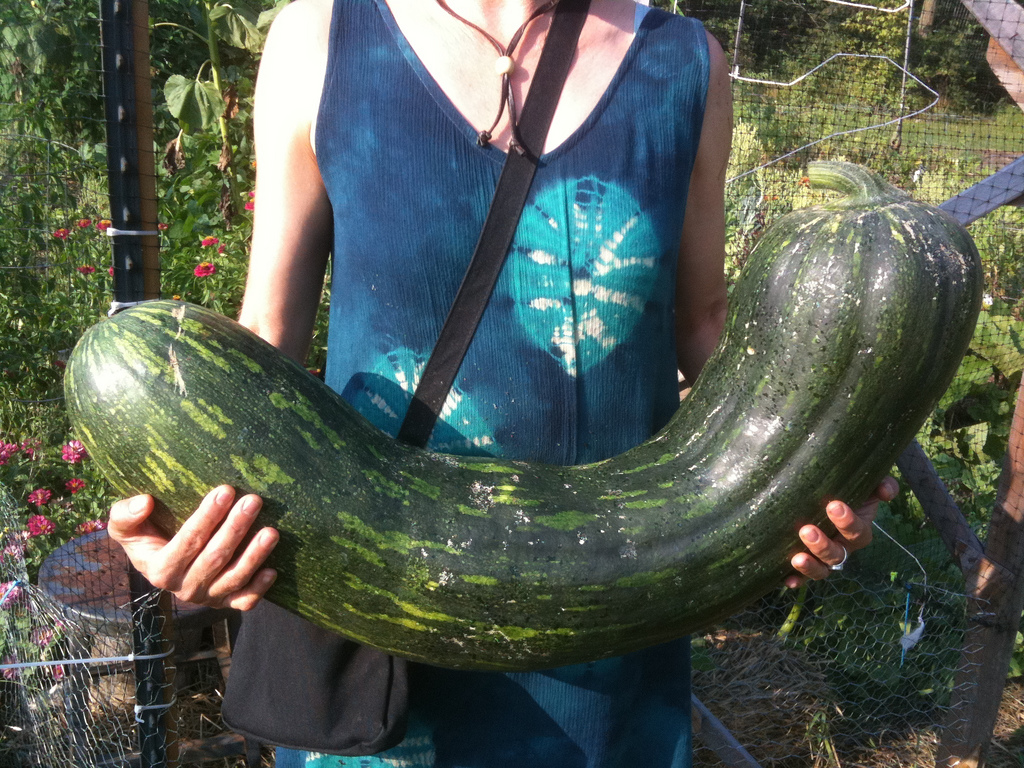
Naples long squash

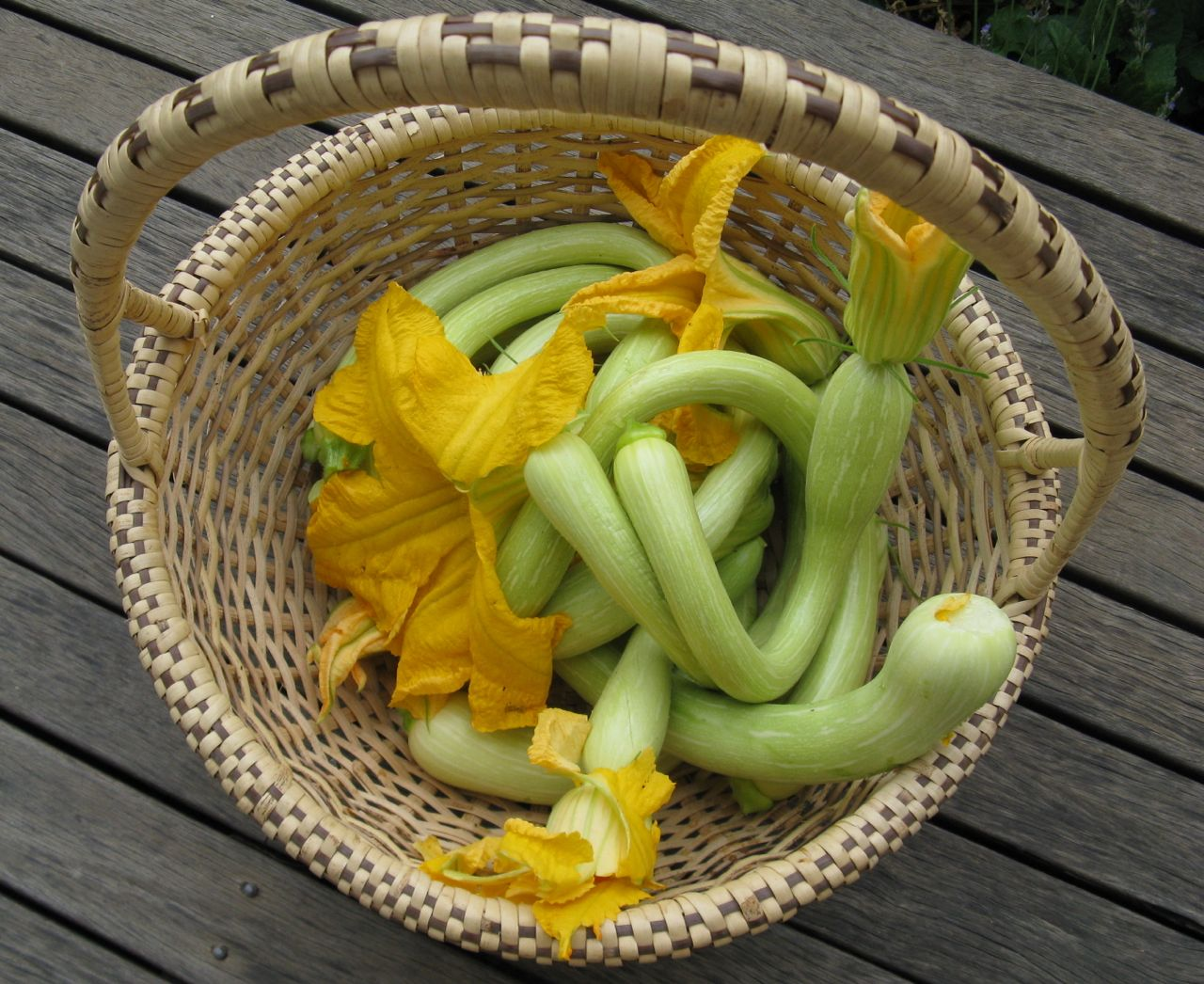
Tromboncino
