= London Vegetable Orchestra =

- Genre: Cover versions
- Instruments: Carrot recorder, courgette trumpets, butternut squash trombones, pumpkin drums and aubergine castanets, amongst others
- Years active: 2009-present
- Website: londonvegetableorchestra.com

The London Vegetable Orchestra is a British musical ensemble that fabricates and subsequently plays musical instruments made out of vegetables. It is understood to be the only vegetable orchestra in the United Kingdom.

The orchestra was founded circa 2009 by recorder-maker Tim Cranmore. Tim was challenged in a bet to carve a recorder from a carrot, which prompted the founding of the ensemble. Many of the original members were students at the Royal Academy of Music. As of 2016, members of the orchestra also included professional musicians with the London Symphony Orchestra or the Royal Philharmonic Orchestra. Like the Long Island Vegetable Orchestra, the group was inspired by The Vegetable Orchestra.

Instruments created and played by the group include courgette trumpets, butternut squash trombones, pumpkin drums and aubergine castanets. Other vegetables played include bell peppers, potatoes and parsnips. The group must use fresh vegetables, created on the day of performance, to ensure the best sound quality. The group has performed on Countryfile, Russell Howard's Good News, This Morning, Ant and Dec's Saturday Night Takeaway, Room 101, amongst others.

The group plays a wide range of music across genres, from "Greensleeves" to "Billie Jean" (punning on both names: 'Greens-leaves' and 'Billie Auber-jean').

In October 2024, the group performed 'The 'Farmonic' Orchestra' at The Other Palace Theatre in London, sponsored by Ginsters and raising money for The Trussell Trust. In December 2024, a video of the group performing "Jingle Bells" on BBC Radio 3 went viral on Instagram. The performance quickly gained over 11 million views. In April 2025, the group performed at Windsor Castle and Charles III joined them for an impromptu performance of "Twinkle, Twinkle Little Star" in which he played the carrot recorder.
