= Al Hachi =

Kashmiri cultivar of calabash

Al Hachi is a Kashmiri cultivar of calabash.

== Use ==
The people of Kashmir dry Al Hachi (calabash) to eat in the winter, when snowfall can isolate the valley. Fresh bottle gourd are cut into slices and let them to dry in sunlight. Al Hachi can be cooked with Mutton, Rajma daal, and with other dry Kashmiri vegetable Ragawan Hachi (Dry Tomato).
