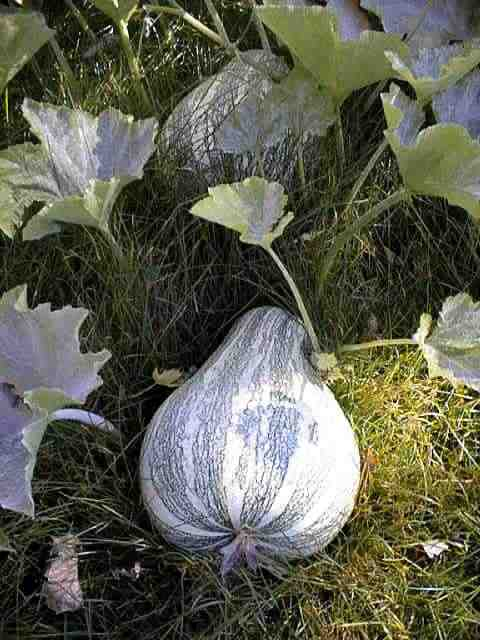

Conservation status
- Least Concern (IUCN 3.1)

Scientific classification
- Kingdom: Plantae
- Clade: Tracheophytes
- Clade: Angiosperms
- Clade: Eudicots
- Clade: Rosids
- Order: Cucurbitales
- Family: Cucurbitaceae
- Genus: Cucurbita
- Species: C. argyrosperma

Binomial name
- Cucurbita argyrosperma C.Huber

Synonyms
- Cucurbita argyrosperma subsp. sororia (L.H.Bailey) Merrick & D.M.Bates; Cucurbita argyrosperma var. callicarpa Merrick & D.M.Bates; Cucurbita argyrosperma var. palmeri (L.H.Bailey) Merrick & D.M.Bates; Cucurbita argyrosperma var. stenosperma (Pangalo) Merrick & D.M.Bates; Cucurbita cyanoperizona (Pangalo) Bukasov; Cucurbita kellyana L.H.Bailey; Cucurbita mixta Pangalo; Cucurbita mixta var. cyanoperizona Pangalo; Cucurbita mixta var. stenosperma Pangalo; Cucurbita moschata var. argyrosperma (C.Huber) Naudin; Cucurbita palmeri L.H.Bailey; Cucurbita pepo var. sororia (L.H.Bailey) Filov; Cucurbita sororia L.H.Bailey; Cucurbita stenosperma (Pangalo) Bukasov

= Cucurbita argyrosperma =

Species of flowering plant

Cucurbita argyrosperma, commonly known as cushaw, kershaw, or silver-seed gourd, is a species of squash grown most frequently in North and Central America, and believed to originate from southern Mexico. This annual herbaceous plant is cultivated for its nutritional value: its flowers, shoots, and fruits are all harvested, but it is cultivated commonly in its native range for seeds.

The species is believed to have originated in Mexico, from its wild sororia form. The reference genome of this species was published in 2019. In precolonial America, archaeological remains have been found as far northward as the Eastern Agricultural Complex. The extant native range of the wild sororia type is from northern Mexico through Central America to Nicaragua, at elevations from sea level to 1,900m.

The species epiphet argyrosperma means "silver seeds" in reference to the distinctively-colored seed margins of certain varieties. Cucurbita argyrosperma was formerly known as C. mixta. Historically, some varieties now recognized as C. argyrosperma were assigned to Cucurbita moschata instead. A small number of true C. moschata varieties are still commonly known as cushaws.

== Description ==
The flowers are orange or yellow and bloom in July or August. The plant grows about 1 foot high and spreads 10–15 feet. It likes well drained soil and has both male and female flowers. Fruits can weigh up to 20 pounds.

A interspecific hybridization experiment in 1990 noted that as of that time Cucurbita argyrosperma was often grown in close proximity to Cucurbita moschata in Guatemala and Mexico. An interspecific variety called Chay Im'um in Mayan has been known to feature the seed quantity of Cucurbita moschata with the larger seed size of C. argyrosperma.

== Systematics ==
Some authorities have used the name Cucurbita mixta for this species, but argyrosperma has been shown to have precedence. Prior to the modern understanding of this species, many C. argyrosperma varieties were assigned to the species Cucurbita moschata. Genetic research shows that C. argyrosperma and C. moschata are closely related but distinct.

== Origin and history ==
The genus Cucurbita is endemic to the Americas, where it was more widely distributed in prehistoric times. Ecological shifts and the extinction of megafauna likely explain substantial reduction in wild Cucurbita populations during the Holocene epoch. The first example of a Curcubita species in cultivation is C. pepo which is believed to have been cultivated by inhabitants of Guilá Naquitz cave between 10,000 and 8,000 years ago.

=== Wild types ===
As of November 2025, Plants of the World Online does not recognize any subspecies or varieties, treating those that have been named as synonyms of the species.

Other sources accept a number of subspecies and varieties. C. argyrosperma subsp. sororia is believed to be the wild ancestor of the other forms. The other free-living type, palmeri, is placed in the domesticated subspecies C. argyrosperma subsp. argyrosperma as var. palmeri. Variety palmeri is believed to be a feral lineage that incorporates wild and domesticated genetics.

Both C. argyrosperma subsp. sororia and C. argyrosperma subsp. argyrosperma var. palmieri are found in regions where domesticated C. argyrosperma has been grown for the longest time. Today the wild sororia type can be found growing freely from Nicaragua to Guatemala and the Mexican coasts of Veracruz, Chiapas, Oaxaca, Guerrero, Michoacán, Colima, Jalisco, Nayarit, Sinaloa, and Sonora. It was formally described by Liberty Hyde Bailey in 1943, in Gentes Herbarum. Sororia, meaning 'sister', was historically classified as closely related to Cucurbita texana with which it hybridizes well. In 1948, the proposed type for another species Cucurbita kellyana was published, but this taxa is now considered a synonym for C. sororia. The palmieri type is found from the Pacific coast of northwestern Mexico to Nicaragua. It was originally formally described by Liberty Hyde Bailey in 1943, in Gentes Herbarum and is now believed to be a mixture of wild and domesticated genetics.

== Domestication ==
The earliest known possible archaeological records of C. argyrosperma are 8,700-year-old phytoliths in the Central Balsas River valley in Guerrero, but these remains are considered ambiguous. The earliest unambiguous specimen is a C. argyrosperma peduncle that has been dated to approximately 5,100 years ago, from the Ocampo caves.

Genetic evidence centers the domestication of C. argyrosperma in what is now Jalisco, Mexico. Other evidence suggests that following domestication and before European contact, C. argyrosperma diffused northward into what is now the eastern and central United States before European contact. C. argyrosperma seeds have been recovered from Late Mississippian archaeological contexts in Arkansas that suggest domesticated C. argyrosperma was established in that region 1,310–623 years ago.

Domestication involved genetic changes to attributes related to growing, handling, and using the plant. C. argyrosperma is thought to follow a domestication pattern similar to other Cucurbita, beginning with reduction of bitterness and an increase in seed size. In C. argyrosperma, attributes affected by domestication and selective breeding include:

- reduction in bitter taste from cucurbitacins;
- increase in the size of fruits and seeds;
- more uniform germination time;
- reduced size and abundance of urticating trichomes (hair);
- diversification of fruit shape.

Variety argyrosperma of Cucurbita argyrosperma subsp. argyrosperma has historically been cultivated in eastern and southern Mexico and in Central America. The geographic center of cultivation for variety callicarpa has been central and northwestern Mexico and the southwestern United States. This variety has been documented in Argentina and Peru where it is believed to be a relatively recent introduction. Subspecies argyrosperma var. stenosperma is endemic to Mexico and has historically been cultivated in the region south of Mexico City.

Some evidence suggests that the modern subsp. argyrosperma var. argyrospermа most closely resembles early domesticated C. argyrosperma. In southern Mexico and Guatemala, var. stenosperma and var. argyrosperma are cultivated for seeds. The fruit is often used as animal feed. Common names for these types, pipiana and pepitoria, reflects of their selection for seeds.

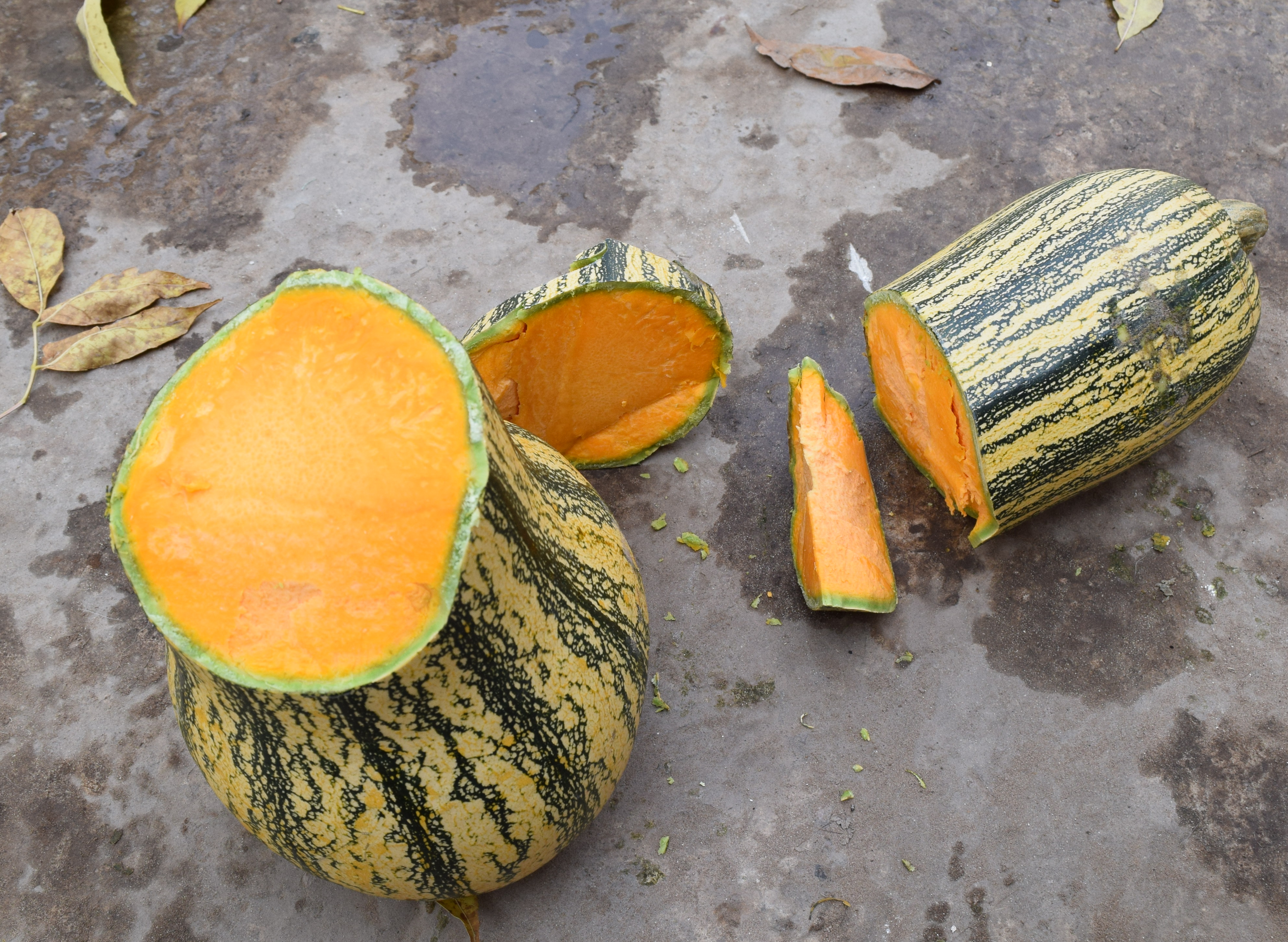
A C. argyrosperma fruit in Argentina that has been opened with a machete. This fruit has a hard rind and rich orange flesh. Cultivars of subsp. argyrosperma var. callicarpa have been found in Argentina where they are thought to be recent agricultural introductions.

The diversity of fruit and seed morphology in var. stenospermа and callicarpa suggest selection has occurred for the fruit's flesh as well as for edible seeds in those varieties. Further south, the immature fruits of var. stenosperma are consumed as a "summer squash" vegetable. There farmers often grow landrace varieties which have diverse attributes in many regards but prioritize long-necked fruits. Fruits with a long neck are considered preferable when the flesh is used for culinary purposes.

Variety callicarpa is found the farthest north of the domesticated varieties. It also typically features elongated rather than globose fruit. In general, the flesh var. callicarpa is considered of higher culinary quality than the fruit of var. stenosperma and var. argyrosperma.

=== Eastern North America ===
One issue facing assessments of the origins and history of domesticated Cucurbita argyrosperma relates to the fact that the species was not fully described at the time of many archaeological studies that guided the 20th century understanding of the domestication and dispersal of this species. Ancient peduncle remains may have been mistakenly assigned to C. maxima and C. moschata, while seed remains may have been assigned to C. maxima, C. moschata, or C. pepo.

Domesticated landraces of C. argyrosperma subsp. argyrosperma var. callicarpa may have reached what is now Virginia and New England hundreds of years before European colonization.

== Cultivars ==
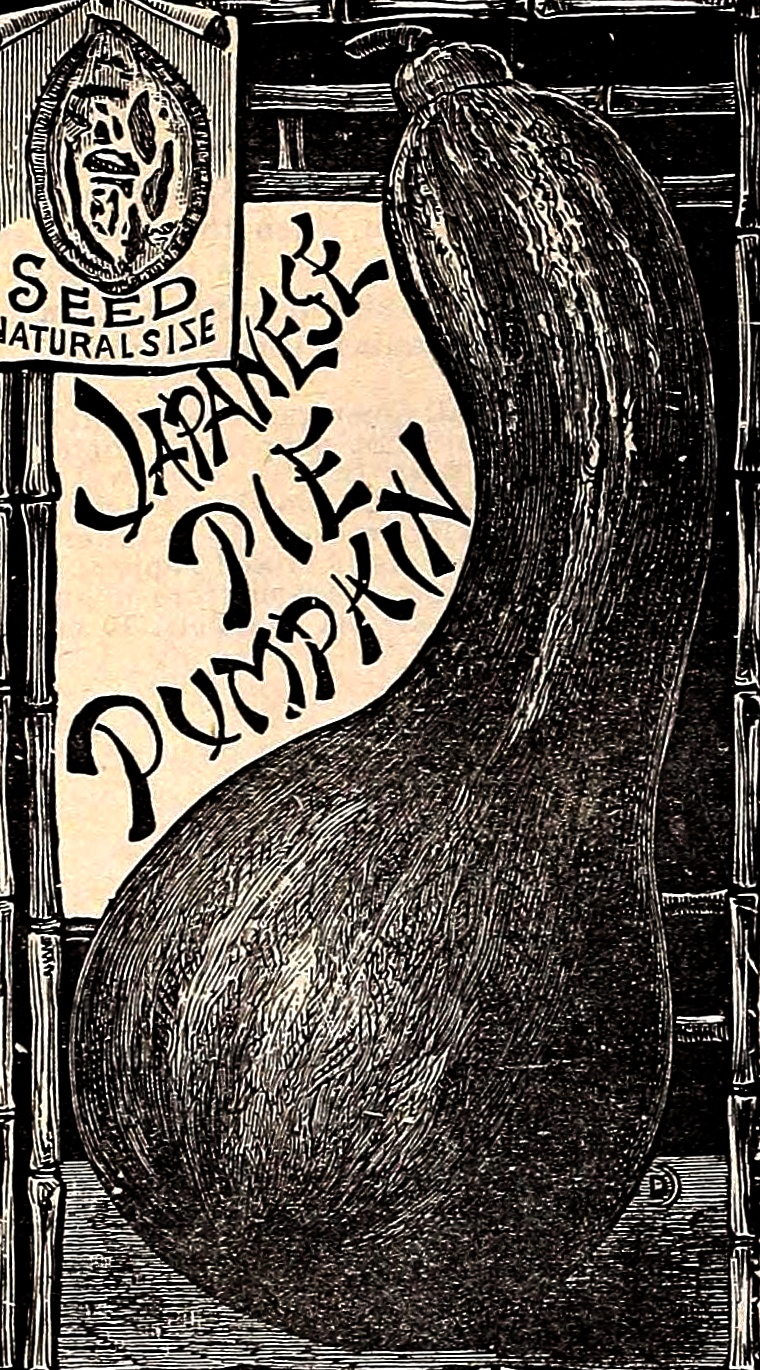
The Japanese pie pumpkin is so-called because its seeds are crazed, resembling to Americans Chinese characters or Japanese kanji. This variety was introduced commercially by Samuel Wilson of Pennsylvania in 1884.

In areas where C. argyrosperma is traditionally cultivated, it is common to use terms to describe fruit based on its qualities rather than using a cultivar name. Only a few named cultivars of Cucurbita argyrosperma have been commercialized. Cultivars in commercial distribution in the United States are usually var. callicarpa, and include 'Green Striped Cushaw', 'Orange Striped Cushaw', 'Jonathan Pumpkin', 'White Cushaw', 'Japanese Pie', and 'Tennessee Sweet Potato'.

Commercial cultivars that have been selected from var. argyrosperma include 'Silverseed Gourd' and 'Campeche Squash'.

== Uses ==
=== Food ===
The flowers, stems, shoots, ripe fruits and unripe fruits of the species are consumed as vegetables, although individual varieties may typically only be used for certain purposes.

In the Sonoran Desert region of the Southwestern United States and Northwestern Mexico, C. argyrosperma squash are grown by native peoples, especially the Tohono O'odham, where it is especially prized when immature as a summer squash. In Mexico, C. argyrosperma seeds are an important food product. Some varieties have been bred with seeds that have oil content as high as 39 percent and protein content 44 percent. Seeds are eaten raw, roasted, toasted, or ground. Cucurbita seeds and C. argyrosperma seeds in particular are an important part of recipes for traditional sauces.

The seeds of wild, bitter gourds are used as food after processing to reduce toxic cucurbitacin.

=== Medicine ===
In the Mexican states of Colima and Jalisco, bitter C. argyrosperma gourds are known in Spanish as calabacilla as well as by names from the Nahuatl language, including agualaxtle, aguachichi, aguichichi, tolonchi, tololonche, tolonchi, and tolenche. In Colima and Jalisco the seeds from wild gourds are ground as part of a beverage called agua fresca, which is said to have a purifying effect.

In Guerrero and Michoacán wild C. argyrosperma gourds are called chamaco, calabacilla, calabaza de coyote (or coyote), as well as chicayota, which comes from the Nahuatl language.

In Jalisco the pulp of the fruit is used as a remedy against mange and the seeds are used for the treatment of liver and kidney diseases.

People in the Yucatán have traditionally used the flesh of Cucurbita argyrosperma to tend burns, sores, and eczema, while the seeds have been used with the aim of promoting lactation in nursing women, and provide pain relief. Use of wild C. argyrosperma to treat acne has also been recorded in Chiapas.

A Spanish name for the wild gourds in Oaxaca is calabaza amarga, meaning bitter gourd. Other terms used in that area include the Nahuatl tecomachichi, and the Zapotec guedu laac. Wild fruits have been used in Oaxaca for healing wounds.

=== Livestock ===
The fruit of some varieties is traditionally fed to livestock.

In Chiapas, where names for wild C. argyrosperma gourds include calabaza de caballo (horse pumpkin), calabaza de burro (donkey pumpkin), and coloquinto, horses and donkeys eat the wild fruits.

=== Crafts ===
Wild C. argyrosperma gourd shells are used for handicrafts in Chiapas. The wild gourds have been used in Oaxaca and Michoacán as soap.

== Cultivation ==
Cucurbita argyrosperma subsp. argyrosperma, which includes all domesticated cushaw taxa, is adapted to warm climates and is most commonly cultivated at low elevations. The maximum elevation for this subspecies is at approximately 1,800 m above sea level.

In Mexico, the state of Campeche leads Cucurbita argyrosperma production. A study of agricultural technology used in conventional C. argyrosperma cultivation in Campeche indicated that some technologies used elsewhere in industrialized farming systems, such as irrigation, are not productive. Chemical treatments are the most common agritech practice in those areas.

== Gallery ==
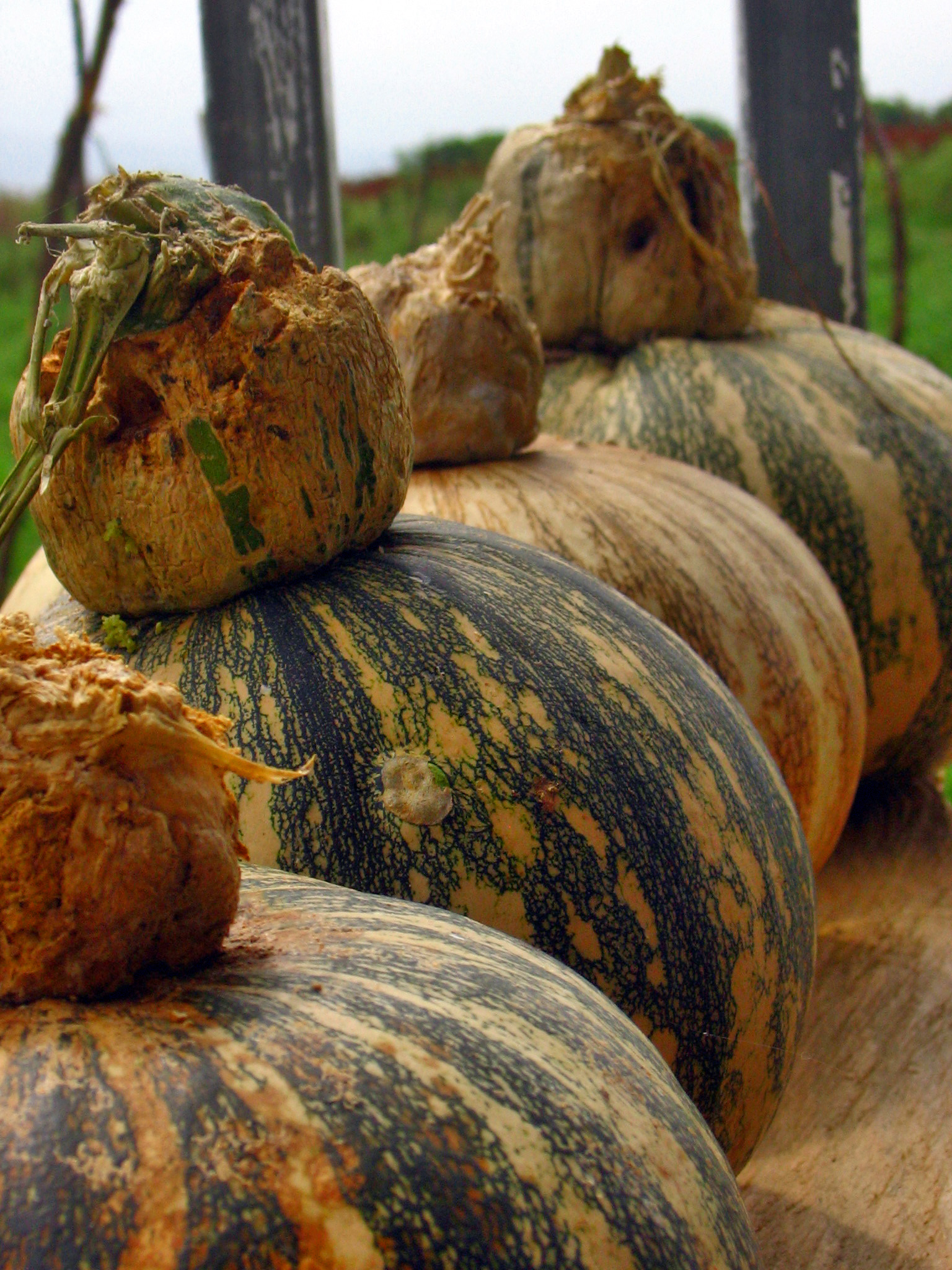
Pipián variety used for edible seeds.

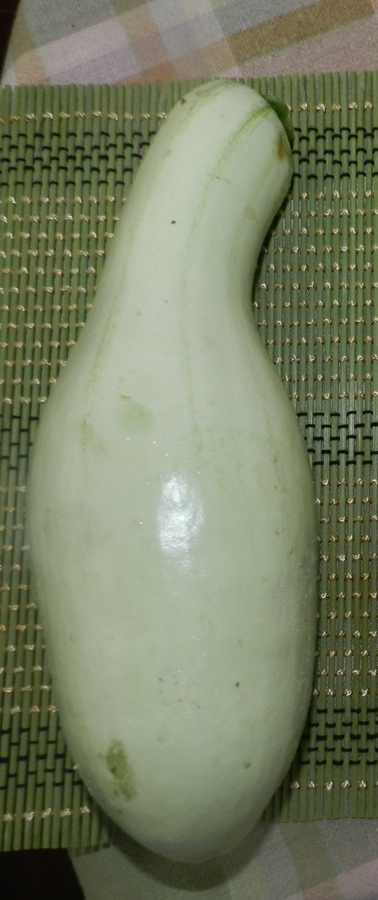
Pipián fresco, a summer squash variety in El Crucero, Managua, Nicaragua.

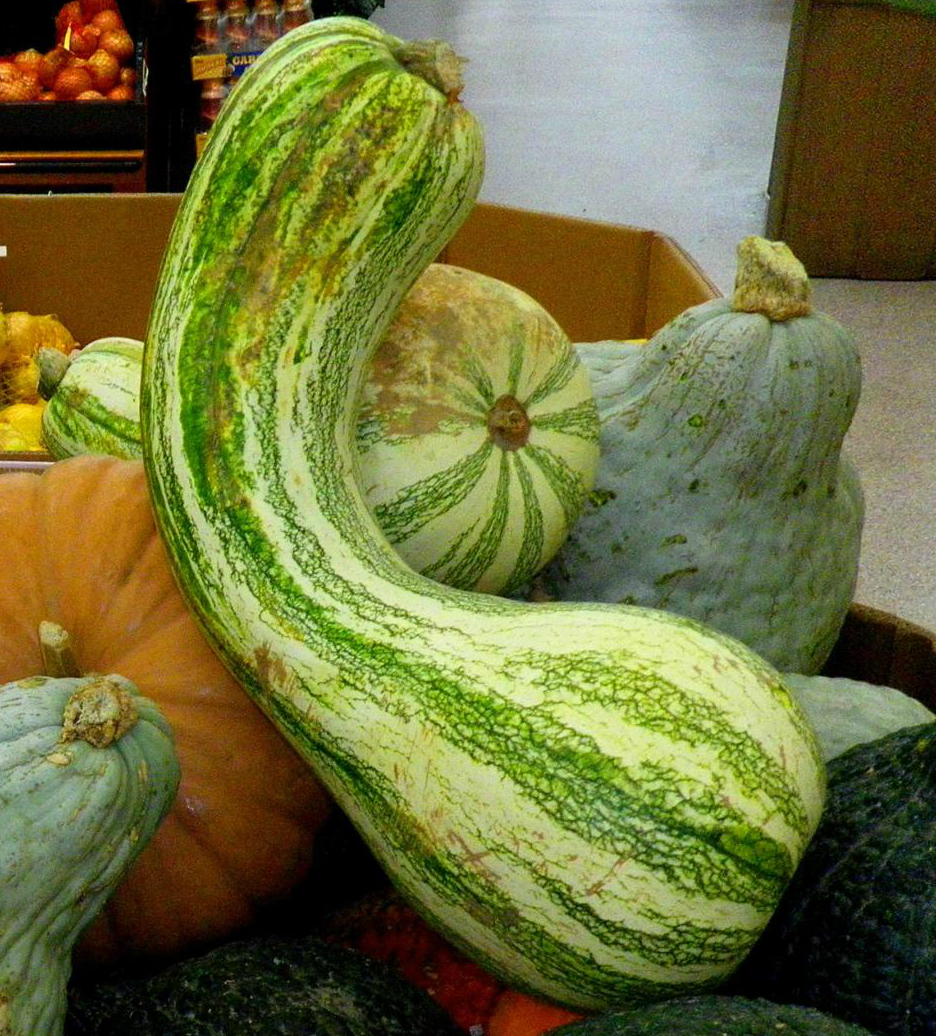
Variety 'green striped cushaw' harvested at full maturity as a winter squash.

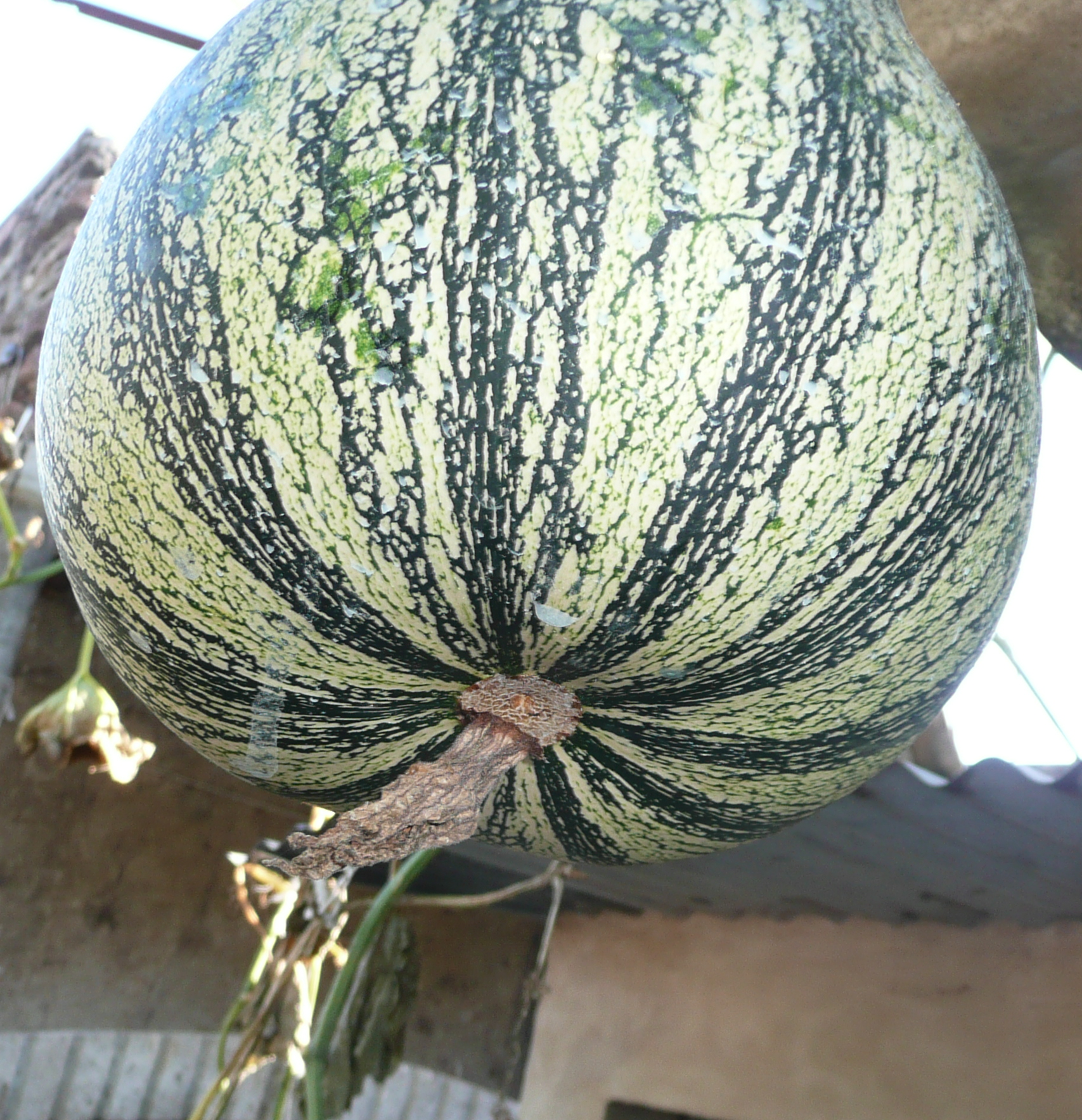
The blossom-end of a calabaza rayada fruit, including blossom scar.

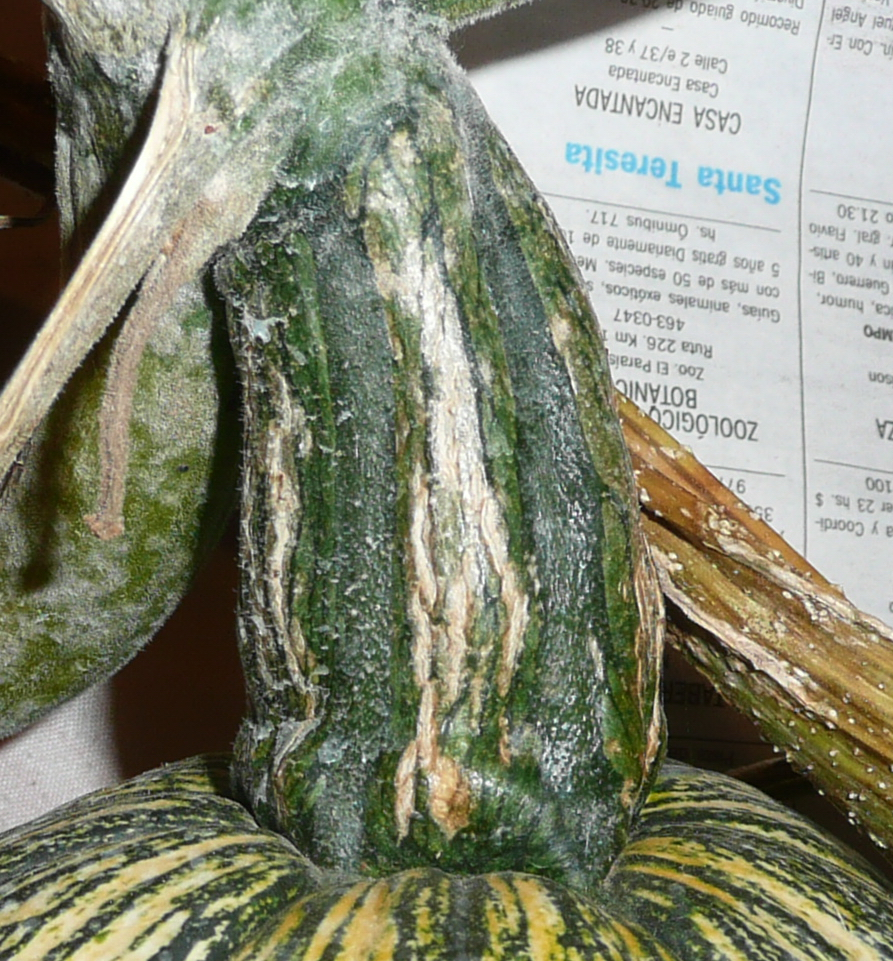
The peduncle of a calabaza rayada fruit.
