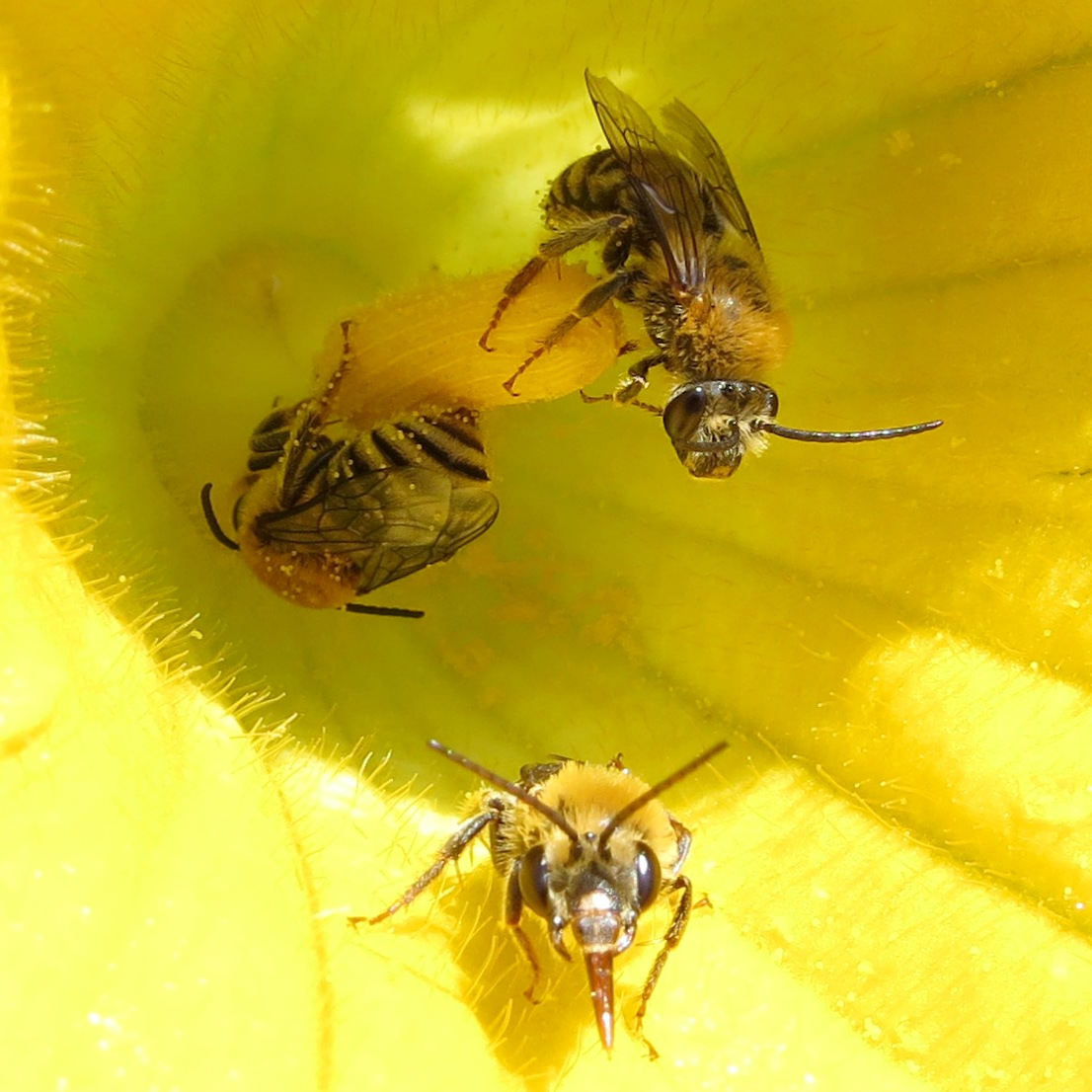

Conservation status
- Secure (NatureServe)

Scientific classification
- Kingdom: Animalia
- Phylum: Arthropoda
- Clade: Pancrustacea
- Class: Insecta
- Order: Hymenoptera
- Family: Apidae
- Genus: Peponapis
- Species: P. pruinosa

Binomial name
- Peponapis pruinosa Say, 1837

Synonyms
- Macrocera pruinosa Say, 1837; Xenoglossa angelica Cockerell, 1902; Xenoglossa pruinosa (Say, 1837); Xenoglossa howardi Cockerell, 1918; Xenoglossa pruinosa lutzi Cockerell, 1923

= Peponapis pruinosa =

Species of bee

Peponapis pruinosa is a species of solitary bee in the tribe Eucerini, the long-horned bees. Its common name is the eastern cucurbit bee. It may be called the squash bee, but this name can also apply to other species in its genus, as well as the other squash bee genus, Xenoglossa. This bee occurs in North America from the East Coast of the United States to the West Coast and into Mexico. It is an oligolege, specializing on a few host plants, the squashes and gourds of genus Cucurbita. Its range expanded as human agriculture spread throughout North America and squash plants became more abundant and widespread. It may also have spread naturally as the range of its favored wild host plant Cucurbita foetidissima expanded.

This bee is 11 to 14 millimeters long and 4 to 5.5 millimeters wide at the abdomen. It is black with whitish bands on the abdomen and it is coated in yellowish hairs. Branched hairs or scopae on the hind legs help to carry the large, coarse pollen of cucurbits. Males lack scopae, as they do not collect pollen.

This bee relies on wild and cultivated squashes, pumpkins, gourds, and related plants. It may occasionally obtain nectar from other types of plants, but the female will only use Cucurbita pollen to provision her young. Females dig a nest in the ground near its host plants. The nests are known to reach depths of 46 centimeters, but the offspring are usually placed at shallower depths. The bee seems to favor irrigated soils and soils cleared by fire. It may also nest in lawns. The bee will sometimes plug the nest just below the surface, and it may place a tumulus at the entrance. Nest building activity often occurs later in the day, as mornings are usually spent foraging. The squash flower opens early in the morning and closes before noon, and the bee's activity pattern is tied to the flower's cycle. The male bee spends most all of his time in and around flowers, foraging and mating in the open flowers and sleeping inside the closed flowers after noon. The females live in and around the flowers until nesting season, when they live in and maintain one or more nests. The young pupate in late June and early July.

This species is an important pollinator of cultivated crops of squash, pumpkins, and related plants. A squash field with a healthy population of squash bees can be completely pollinated with no need for the introduction of honeybees. This ground-nesting bee often spends its entire life in an irrigated crop field, and there it can face a number of hazards, such as tillage and pesticides. The effects of tillage on P. pruinosa are so great that tilled farms may have three times fewer squash bees than a farm with no tillage. The bumblebee Bombus impatiens has also been found to be a good pollinator of squash, pumpkins in particular.

Peponapis pruinosa, USGS Bee Inventory and Monitoring Lab
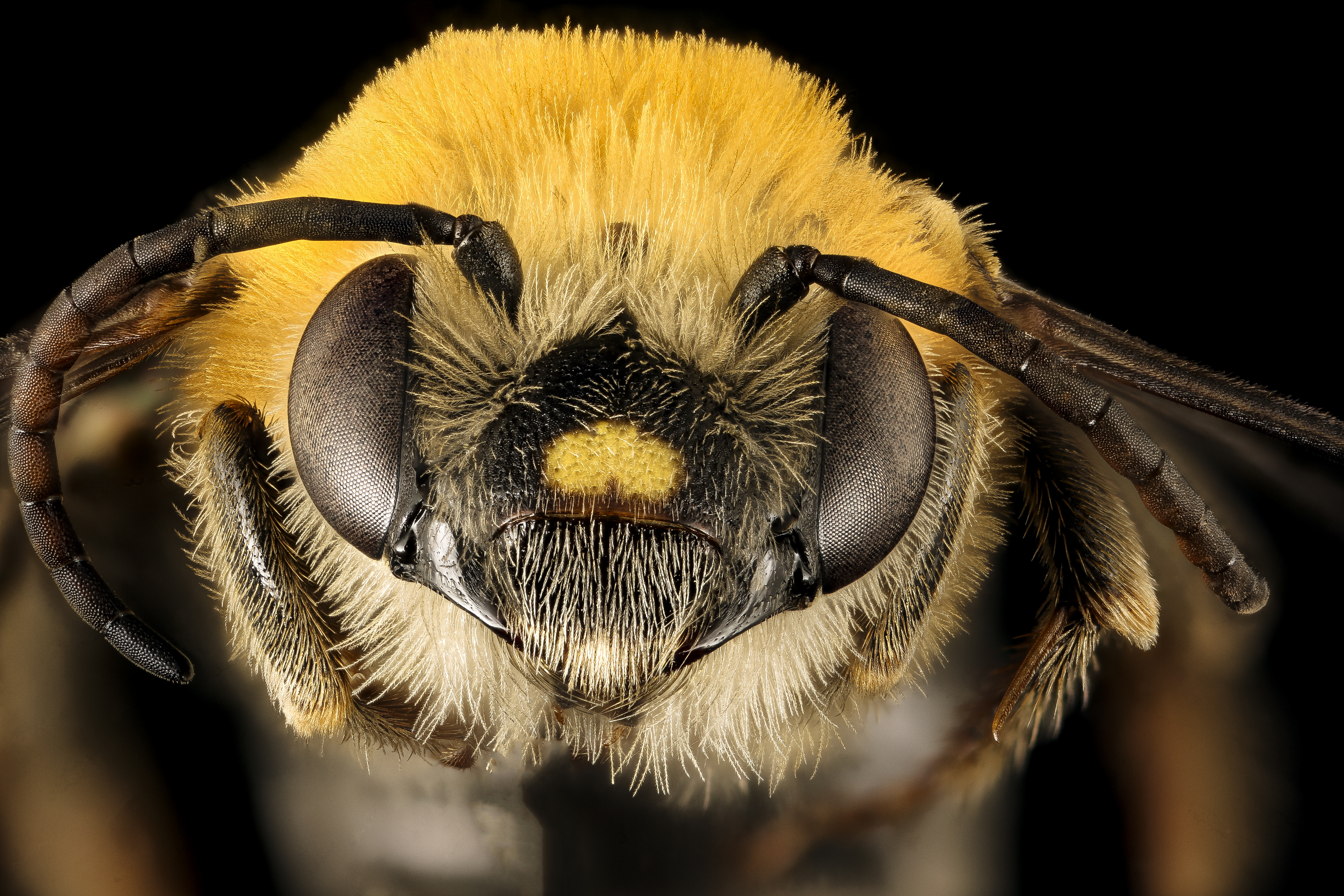
head, male

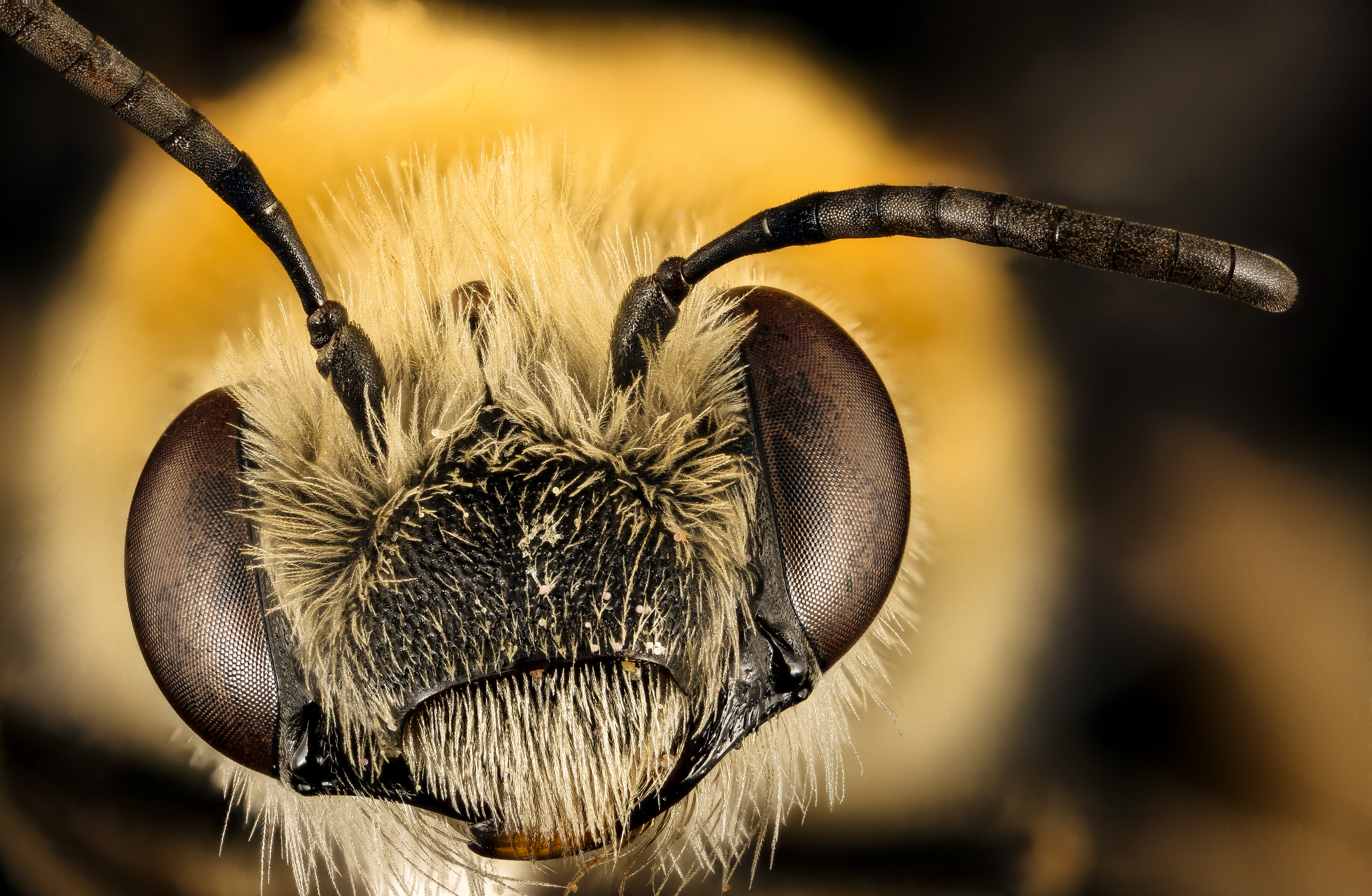
head, female

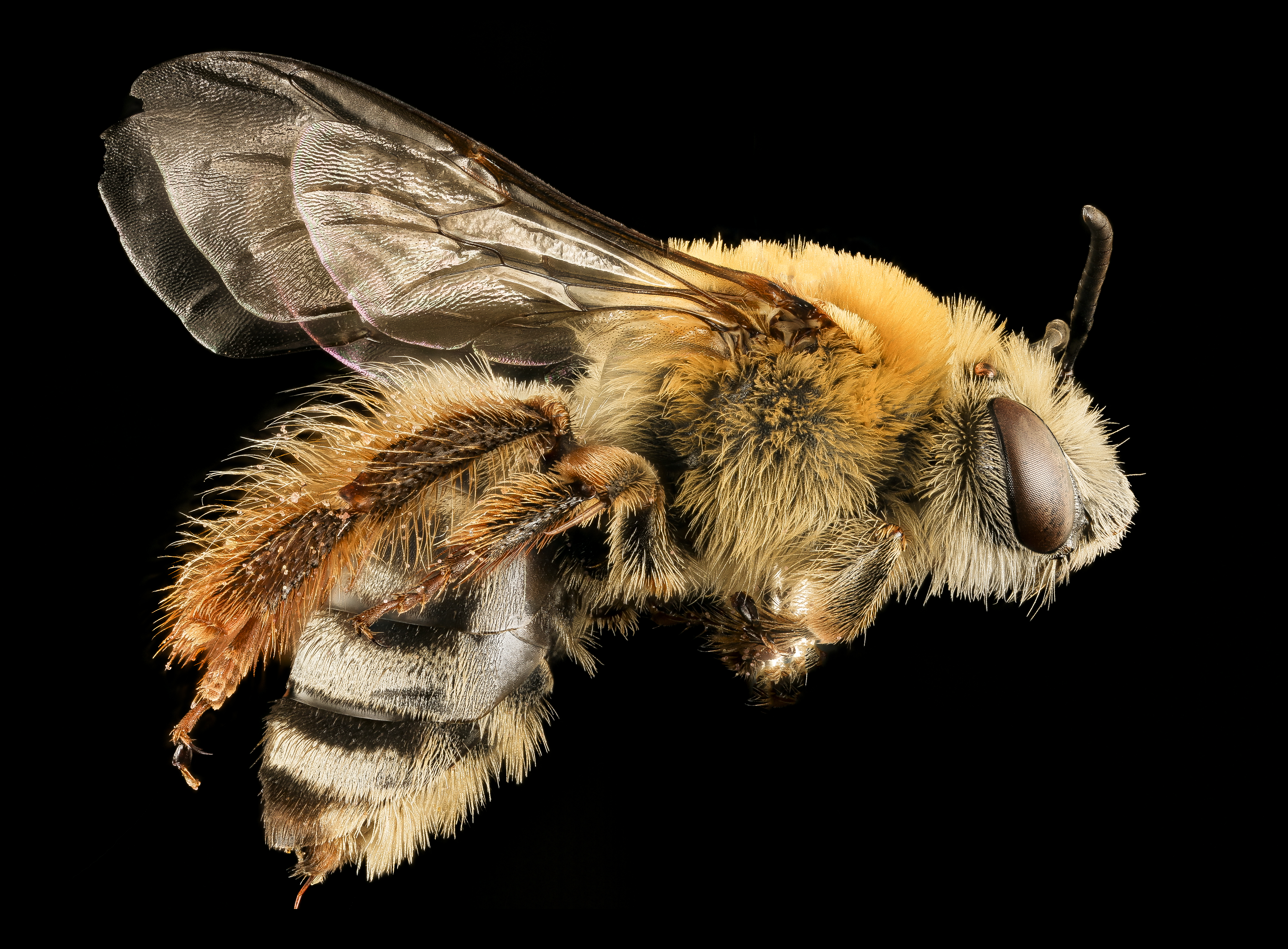
profile, female

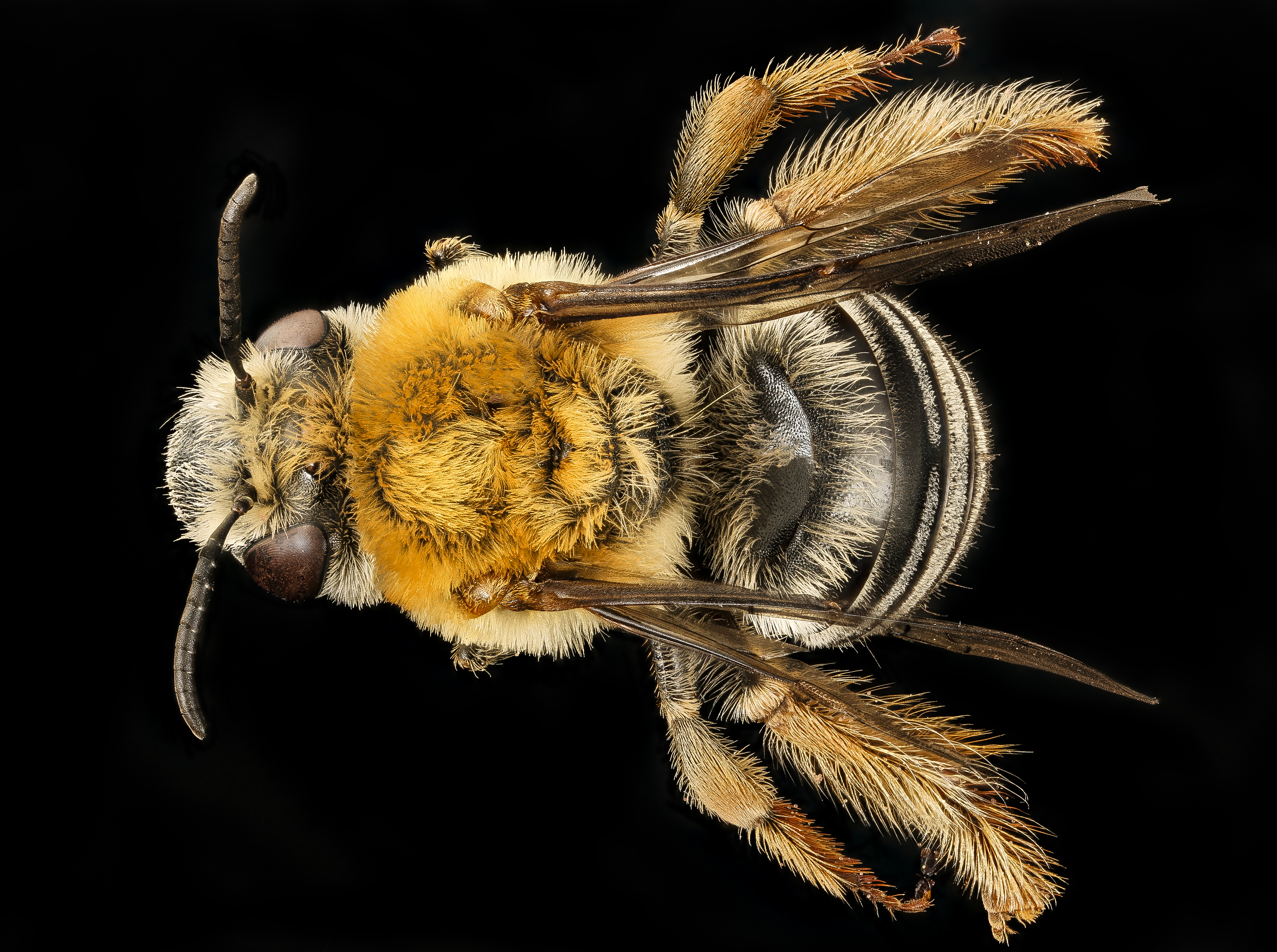
dorsal, female
