= Globoid =

Globoid may refer to:

- Globoid, a trade name for Aspirin
- Globoid (botany), a spherical body seen in early plant development that contains nutrients
- A type of worm gearing
