= Coyote squash =

Coyote squash may refer to:

- Chayote, a type of gourd
- Cucurbita palmata, a type of squash
