= Cucurbita californica =

Scientific classification
- Kingdom: Plantae
- Clade: Tracheophytes
- Clade: Angiosperms
- Clade: Eudicots
- Clade: Rosids
- Order: Cucurbitales
- Family: Cucurbitaceae
- Genus: Cucurbita
- Species: C. californica

Binomial name
- Cucurbita californica S.Wats.

Species of flowering plant

Cucurbita californica is a species of flowering plant in the squash family.

The species was first identified by Sereno Watson in 1876. There is disagreement about whether this is a separate species from Cucurbita palmata. In 1883 botanist C. C. Parry reported it was distinguishable from C. palmata by its smaller fruit and foliage, and fruit that is a dull green with thin ridges. It is similar to Cucurbita cordata, Cucurbita cylindrata, Cucurbita digitata, and Cucurbita palmata and all these species hybridize readily.
