= Cucurbita galeottii =

Scientific classification
- Kingdom: Plantae
- Clade: Tracheophytes
- Clade: Angiosperms
- Clade: Eudicots
- Clade: Rosids
- Order: Cucurbitales
- Family: Cucurbitaceae
- Genus: Cucurbita
- Species: C. galeottii

Binomial name
- Cucurbita galeottii Cogn.

Species of flowering plant

Cucurbita galeottii is a plant species of the genus Cucurbita. It is native to Oaxaca, Mexico. It has not been domesticated. There is very little known about this species. Nee reports that the species is a xerophyte and that Bailey only saw the species in photographs. It is only known from specimens that "lack roots, female flowers, fruits and seeds".

The species was formally described by Alfred Cogniaux in 1881, in the third volume of Alphonse and Casimir de Candolle's Monographiæ Phanerogamarum.

Cucurbita galeottii (ch'ako') is a wild form of squash with round or pear-shaped fruits similar to small bottle gourds, with a green skin and white/yellow stripes. Ch'ako is found along lowland roadsides of southern Mexico. The fruit is tough skinned and bitter, but the young greens are eaten boiled.
