= Cucurbita martinezii =

Scientific classification
- Kingdom: Plantae
- Clade: Tracheophytes
- Clade: Angiosperms
- Clade: Eudicots
- Clade: Rosids
- Order: Cucurbitales
- Family: Cucurbitaceae
- Genus: Cucurbita
- Species: C. martinezii

Binomial name
- Cucurbita martinezii L.H.Bailey

Synonyms
- Cucurbita okeechobeensis subsp. martinezii (L.H.Bailey) T.C.Andres & Nabhan ex T.W.Walters & D.S.Decker

Species of flowering plant

Cucurbita martinezii is a plant species of the genus Cucurbita native to Veracruz, Mexico. Locals use halved fruit shells as shot glasses for alcoholic drinks. It has not been domesticated. It is generally found in areas with rivers and forests.

Some authorities consider it a subspecies of Cucurbita okeechobeensis.

When the species was formally described by Liberty Hyde Bailey in 1943, in Gentes Herbarum, Bailey only had one specimen without flowers or roots to work with.
