= Cucurmosin =

Cucurmosin is a type I ribosome inactivating protein (RIP) found in the sarcocarp (flesh) and seed of Cucurbita — notably Cucurbita moschata, that is toxic to cancer cells, if the dosage is high enough, by stopping their ribosomes. Cucurmosin is what Cucurbita use to defend against viral, fungal, and bacterial agents. It takes a lower dose of cucurmosin to kill cancer cells than healthy cells. It has been shown to induce apoptosis in pancreatic cancer and myeloid leukemia cells.
