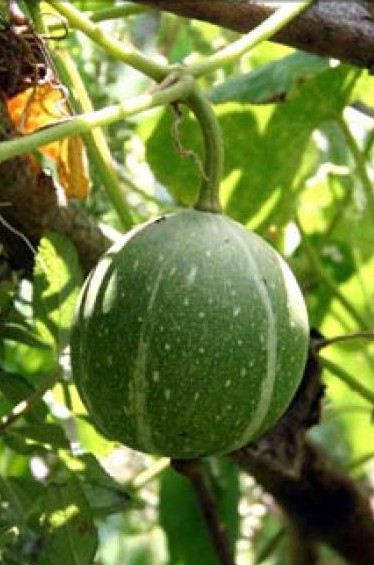
- C. okeechobeensis subsp. okeechobeensis

Conservation status
- Critically Imperiled (NatureServe)

- Data Deficient (IUCN 3.1)

Scientific classification
- Kingdom: Plantae
- Clade: Tracheophytes
- Clade: Angiosperms
- Clade: Eudicots
- Clade: Rosids
- Order: Cucurbitales
- Family: Cucurbitaceae
- Genus: Cucurbita
- Species: C. okeechobeensis

Binomial name
- Cucurbita okeechobeensis (Small) L.H.Bailey

Synonyms
- Pepo okeechobeensis Small

= Cucurbita okeechobeensis =

Okeechobee gourd

Species of vine

Cucurbita okeechobeensis, the Okeechobee gourd, is a species of gourd belonging to the family Cucurbitaceae, native to Mexico and the United States. There are two subspecies; one is endemic to Florida, primarily in the region around Lake Okeechobee, the other to the State of Veracruz in eastern Mexico. Once abundant, it has state and federal listing as an endangered species. One of its peculiarities is the yellow corolla not so common in other Cucurbita species.

== Description ==
A climbing vine, C. okeechobeensis leaves have irregular serrate margins with 5 to 7 angular, shallow lobes. Overall the leaf blades are heart or kidney-shaped. Young leaves are covered with downy hair. The bell-shaped flowers are cream-colored, with long corollas (6 to 7 cm).

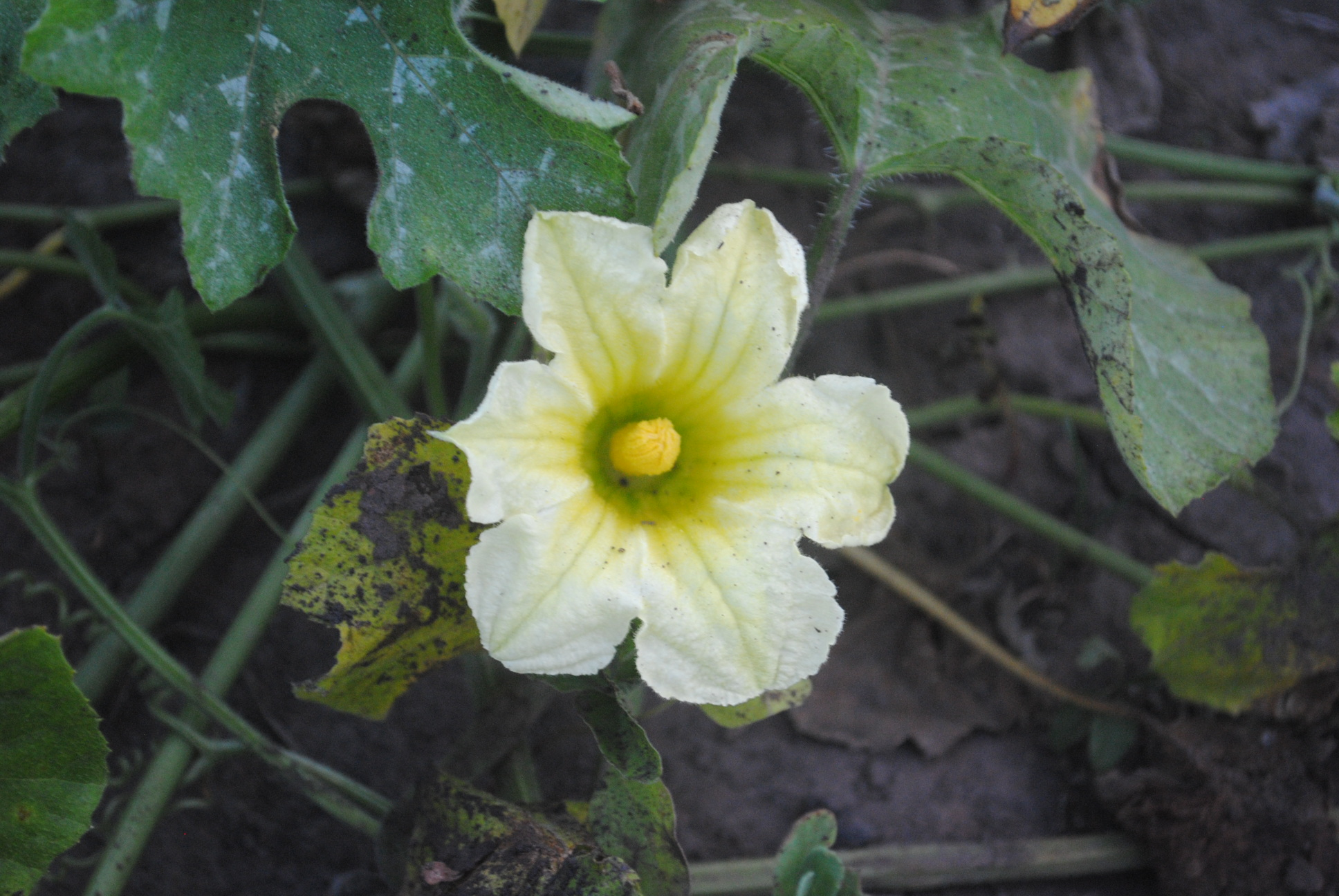
Male flower at anthesis

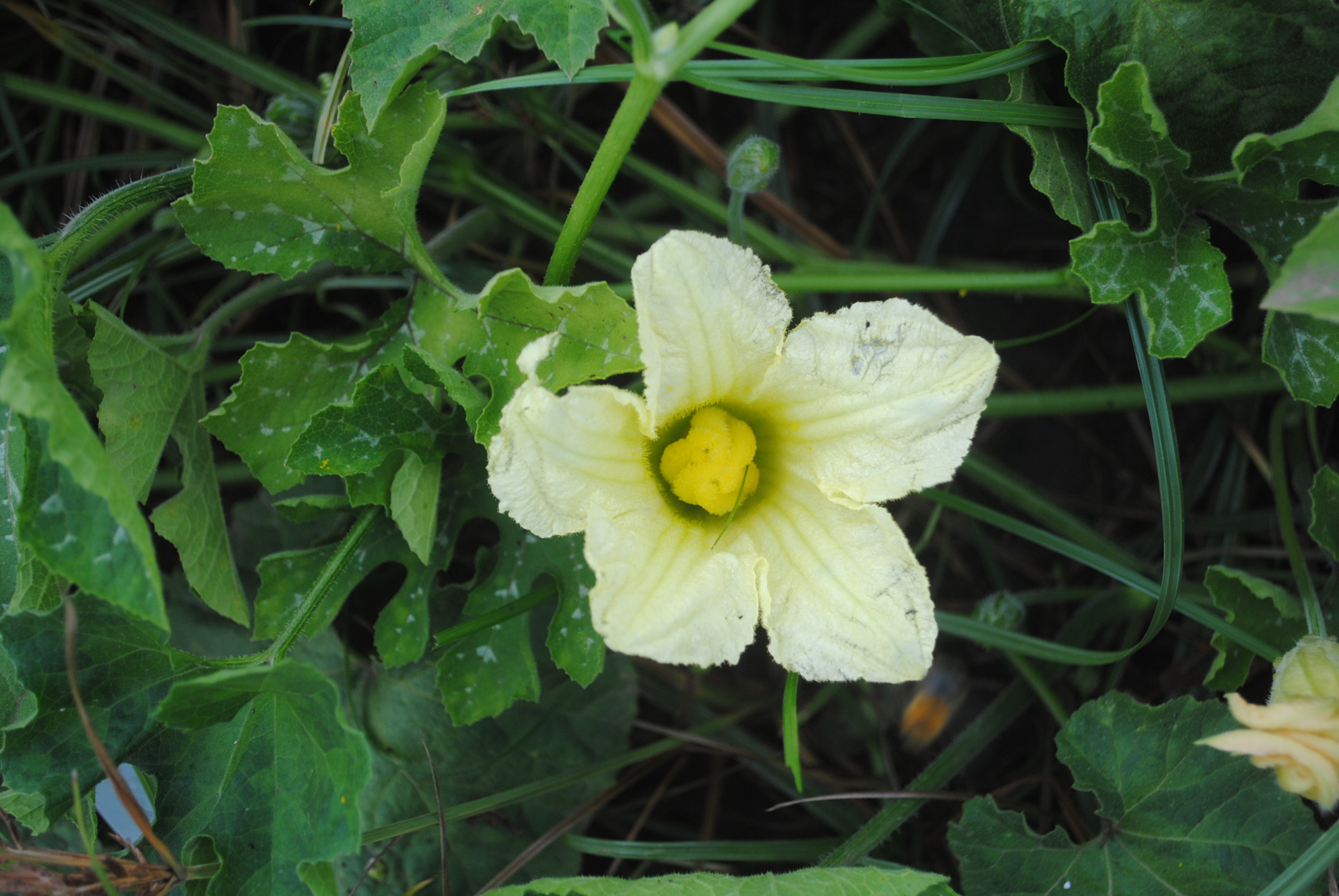
Female flower at anthesis

== Taxonomy ==
The taxonomy of the species and subspecies is uncertain. It was formerly classified as Pepo okeechobeensis.

Some authorities divide it into two subspecies:

- Cucurbita okeechobeensis subsp. martinezii — Martinez gourd, - State of Veracruz in Mexico
- Cucurbita okeechobeensis subsp. okeechobeensis — Okeechobee gourd - State of Florida in United States

== Ecology ==
It was often found growing on abandoned alligator nests in pond apple (Annona glabra) groves near Lake Okeechobee.
