= Cucurbita digitata =

Conservation status
- Least Concern (IUCN 3.1)

Scientific classification
- Kingdom: Plantae
- Clade: Tracheophytes
- Clade: Angiosperms
- Clade: Eudicots
- Clade: Rosids
- Order: Cucurbitales
- Family: Cucurbitaceae
- Genus: Cucurbita
- Species: C. digitata

Binomial name
- Cucurbita digitata Gray

Species of vine

Cucurbita digitata is a species of flowering plant in the squash family known by the common names fingerleaf gourd and bitter squash. It is similar to Cucurbita californica, Cucurbita cordata, Cucurbita cylindrata, and Cucurbita palmata and all these species hybridize readily. These species form the only restricted xerophyte species group in the genus Cucurbita. Each member of this species group is native to the Southwestern United States and Northwestern Mexico where they are relatively uncommon. Each group member is found in hot, arid regions with low rainfall. They prefer soil that is loose, gravelly, and well-drained. C. digitata is native to northern Baja California at higher elevations, northern Sonora, Mexico, southern Arizona, and southwestern New Mexico. The juvenile leaves of C. cylindrata, C. cordata, C. digitata, and C. palmata show a high degree of similarity, but their mature leaves are visibly different, as are their root structures. C. palmata and C. digitata are sympatric, with C. palmata separating the ranges of C. digitata at the juncture of Baja California, California, and Arizona. C. digitata fruits are clear green mottle that turns yellow at maturity, striped, and round.

It was first identified by Asa Gray in 1853.

== Description ==
Cucurbita digitata is a hairy vining plant with sharply palmate leaves having five fingerlike lobes. It is quite similar in appearance to its close relative, the coyote gourd Cucurbita palmata, but the lobes of its leaves are usually more slender.

It has curling yellow flowers up to 5 centimeters wide.

The fruit is a dark green squash, rounded or nearly rounded, with mottling and distinct white stripes. The bitter fruit is very distasteful and generally not edible, although a few animals may hesitantly eat the flesh while trying to get at the seeds. Each white seed is about a centimeter long and at 35% protein and 50% fat is a nutritious food.
