= Cucurbita cylindrata =

Scientific classification
- Kingdom: Plantae
- Clade: Tracheophytes
- Clade: Angiosperms
- Clade: Eudicots
- Clade: Rosids
- Order: Cucurbitales
- Family: Cucurbitaceae
- Genus: Cucurbita
- Species: C. cylindrata

Binomial name
- Cucurbita cylindrata L.H.Bailey

Species of flowering plant

Cucurbita cylindrata is a species of flowering plant in the squash family. It is similar to Cucurbita californica, Cucurbita cordata, Cucurbita digitata, and Cucurbita palmata and all these species hybridize readily. These species form the only restricted xerophyte species group in the genus Cucurbita. Each member of this species group is native to the Southwestern United States and Northwestern Mexico where they are relatively uncommon. Each group member is found in hot, arid regions with low rainfall. They prefer soil that is loose, gravelly, and well-drained. C. cylindrata is found only in the middle portion of Baja California, mostly in Baja California Sur. Botanists Bemis and Whitaker suggest that C. cordata and C. cylindrata may be a case of sympatric speciation. The juvenile leaves of C. cylindrata, C. cordata, C. digitata, and C. palmata show a high degree of similarity, but their mature leaves are visibly different, as are their root structures. C. cylindrata fruits are dark green, striped, and round.

It was first identified by Liberty Hyde Bailey in 1943.
