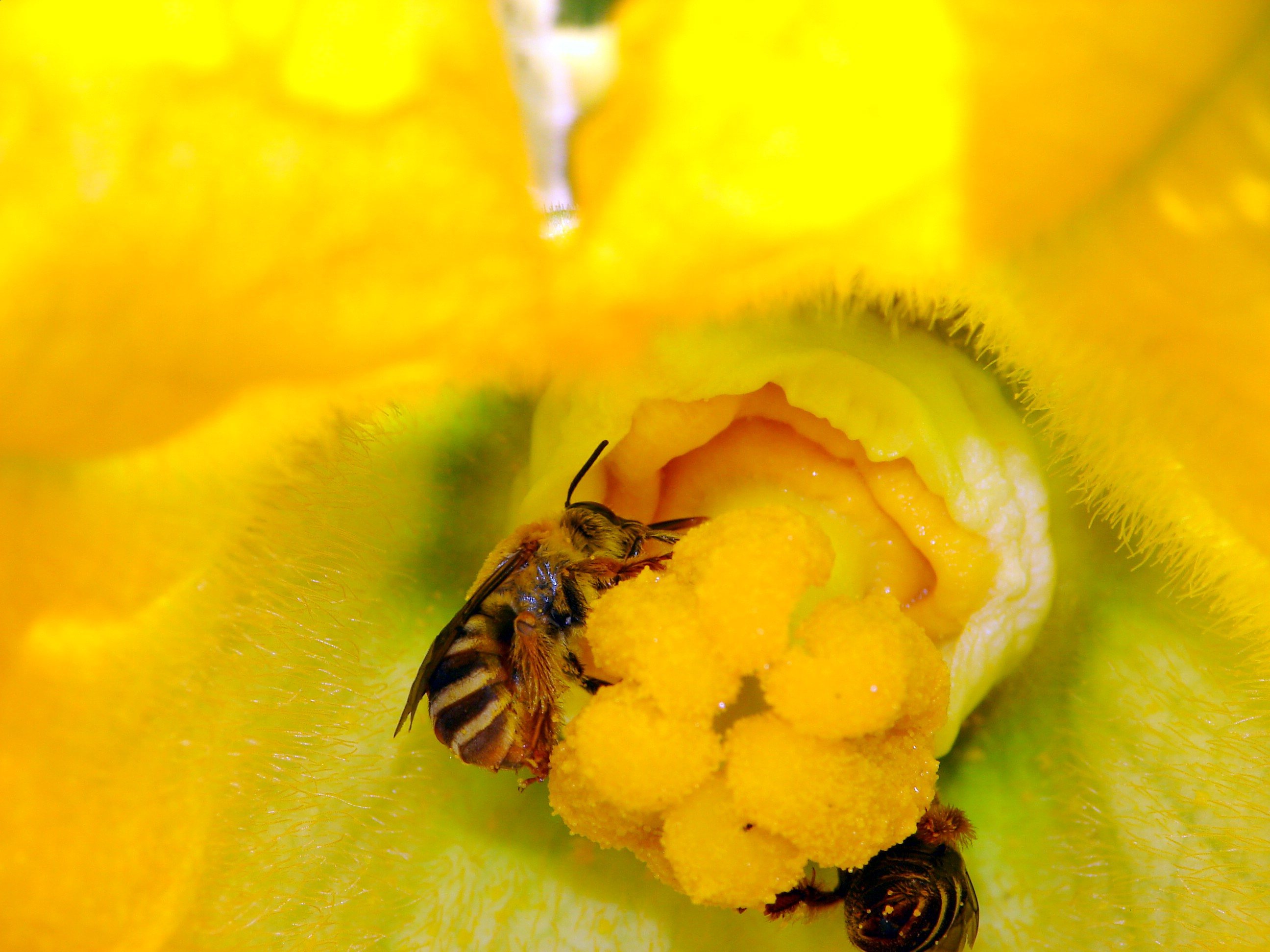
- Peponapis pruinosa

Scientific classification
- Kingdom: Animalia
- Phylum: Arthropoda
- Clade: Pancrustacea
- Class: Insecta
- Order: Hymenoptera
- Family: Apidae
- Subfamily: Apinae
- Tribe: Eucerini

Genera
- Peponapis; Xenoglossa

= Squash bee =

Bees essential for cucurbit pollination

The name squash bee, also squash and gourd bee, is applied to two related genera of bees in the tribe Eucerini; Peponapis and Xenoglossa. Both genera are oligoleges (pollen specialists) on the plant genus Cucurbita and closely related plants, although they usually do not visit watermelon, cucumber, and melon plants. They are small genera, containing only 13 and 7 described species, respectively, and their combined range is nearly identical to the range of Cucurbita in the New World, from South America to North America. Their range has become somewhat expanded along with the movement of cucurbits into other areas (as crop plants).

Species such as Peponapis pruinosa have been in decline due to several reasons, probably at least in part to pesticide sensitivity.

== Description ==
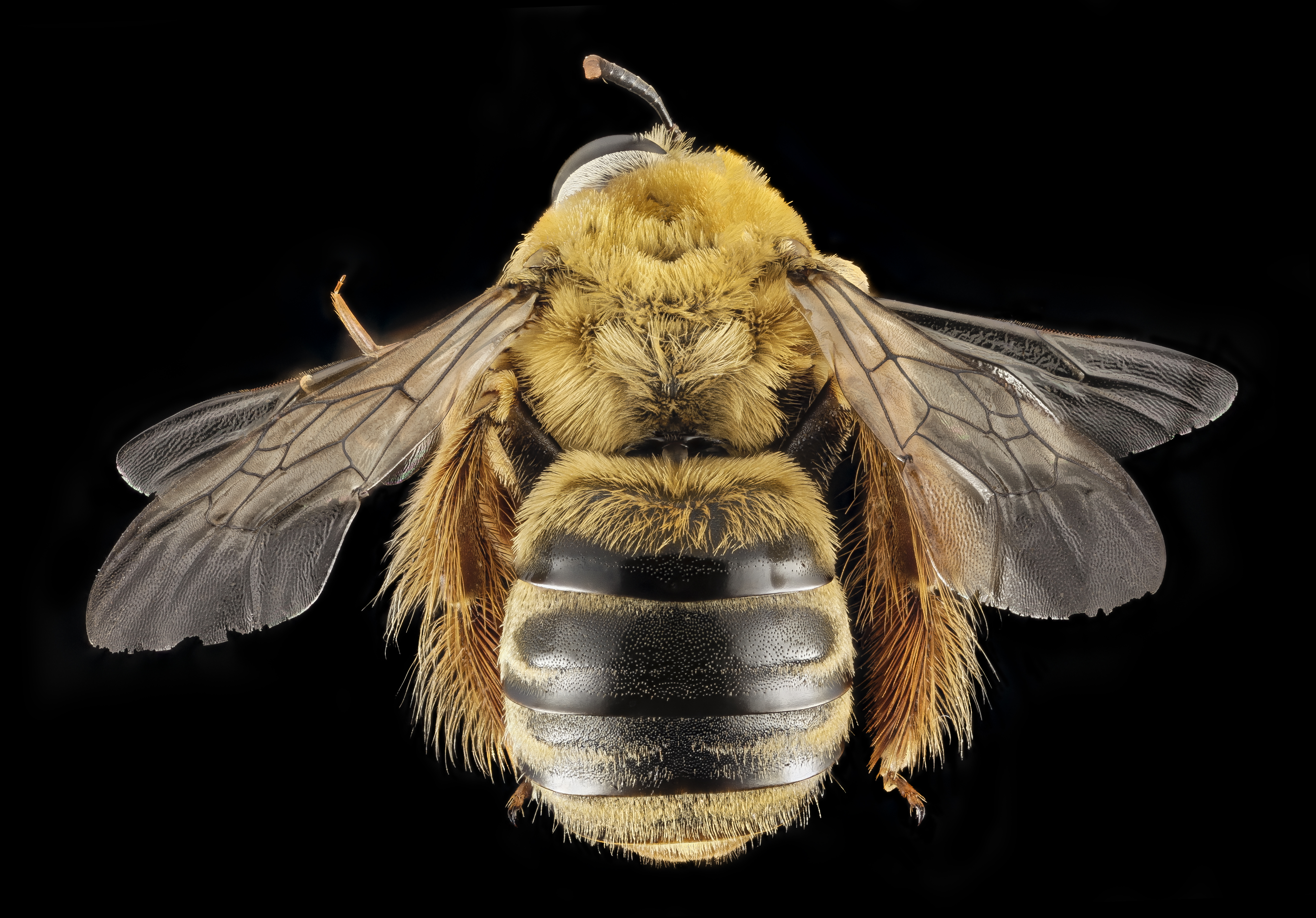
Xenoglossa strenua

These bees are of moderate size, equal to various bumblebees. Compared to honeybees, squash bees are larger and bulkier, with longer antennae and rounder faces. The pollen-carrying hairs on their legs (the scopa) are unbranched or nearly so, to accommodate the exceptionally large, coarse pollen of the host plants. These hairs may be sparse, however among Peponapis, the hind legs are fuzzy and brushlike. Males lack these hairs, as they do not carry pollen.

Squash bees have also evolved a matinal daily activity cycle, flying before sunrise. Some Xenoglossa species have become morphologically specialized to fly while it is still dark, with greatly enlarged ocelli to allow them to fly in near-darkness.

The two genera are sometimes thought to be sister taxa, but enough differences occur between them to suggest the similarities may be due to convergent evolution, based on their adaptation to use the same host plants.

=== Life cycle ===
Squash bees build ground-based nests; they are solitary and do not live in colonies, but are sometimes gregarious. Each pollen-gathering female digs her own nest, which consists of a vertical tunnel terminated by a loose grouping of individual nest cells.

== As pollinators ==
Studies have been carried out to compare Peponapis and honey bees regarding their effectiveness in pollinating cucurbits. The findings point to the squash bees being more effective and suggest the current practice of renting colonies of honey bees to perform this task may be unnecessary.

Squash yield is fully dependent on insect pollinators. Plants pollinated by squash bees include summer squash, winter squash, zucchini, pumpkins, and many gourds excepting cucumbers.
