= Cucurbita lundelliana =

Conservation status
- Least Concern (IUCN 2.3)

Scientific classification
- Kingdom: Plantae
- Clade: Tracheophytes
- Clade: Angiosperms
- Clade: Eudicots
- Clade: Rosids
- Order: Cucurbitales
- Family: Cucurbitaceae
- Genus: Cucurbita
- Species: C. lundelliana

Binomial name
- Cucurbita lundelliana L.H.Bailey

Species of flowering plant

Cucurbita lundelliana is a mesophyte plant species of the genus Cucurbita. It is native to Mexico, Guatemala, and Belize. It has not been domesticated. It is found in the Yucatán region near sea level among limestone cliffs. In Guatemala it is found in Parque Nacional Yaxha Nakum Naranjo along Rio Ixtinto and near Laguna Julequito (west of west end of Lake Yaxha).

It has yellow-orange corollas and gray-green seeds. Its leaves are slightly similar to those of Cucurbita ficifolia. It is resistant to powdery mildew and crown rot.

In 1962 the first successful cross of a wild Cucurbita with a domesticated Cucurbita occurred. In that study by Whitaker, C. lundelliana was mostly dominant in a cross with Cucurbita moschata. The purpose of the study was to find the ancestral plant species of the domesticated Cucurbita. C. lundelliana crosses rather well with the five cultivated species of Cucurbita.

The species was formally described by Liberty Hyde Bailey in 1943, in Gentes Herbarum.
