= Cucurbita cordata =

Conservation status
- Data Deficient (IUCN 3.1)

Scientific classification
- Kingdom: Plantae
- Clade: Tracheophytes
- Clade: Angiosperms
- Clade: Eudicots
- Clade: Rosids
- Order: Cucurbitales
- Family: Cucurbitaceae
- Genus: Cucurbita
- Species: C. cordata

Binomial name
- Cucurbita cordata S.Wats.

Species of flowering plant

Cucurbita cordata is a species of flowering plant in the squash family. It is similar to Cucurbita californica, Cucurbita cylindrata, Cucurbita digitata, and Cucurbita palmata and all these species hybridize readily. These species form the only restricted xerophyte species group in the genus Cucurbita. Each member of this species group is native to the Southwestern United States and Northwestern Mexico where they are relatively uncommon. Each group member is found in hot, arid regions with low rainfall. They prefer soil that is loose, gravelly, and well-drained. C. cordata is found only in the vicinity of Bahía de los Ángeles, Baja California. Botanists Bemis and Whitaker suggest that C. cordata and C. cylindrata may be a case of sympatric speciation. The juvenile leaves of C. cylindrata, C. cordata, C. digitata, and C. palmata show a high degree of similarity, but their mature leaves are visibly different, as are their root structures. C. cordata fruits are gray green, striped, and round.

It was first identified by Sereno Watson in 1889.
