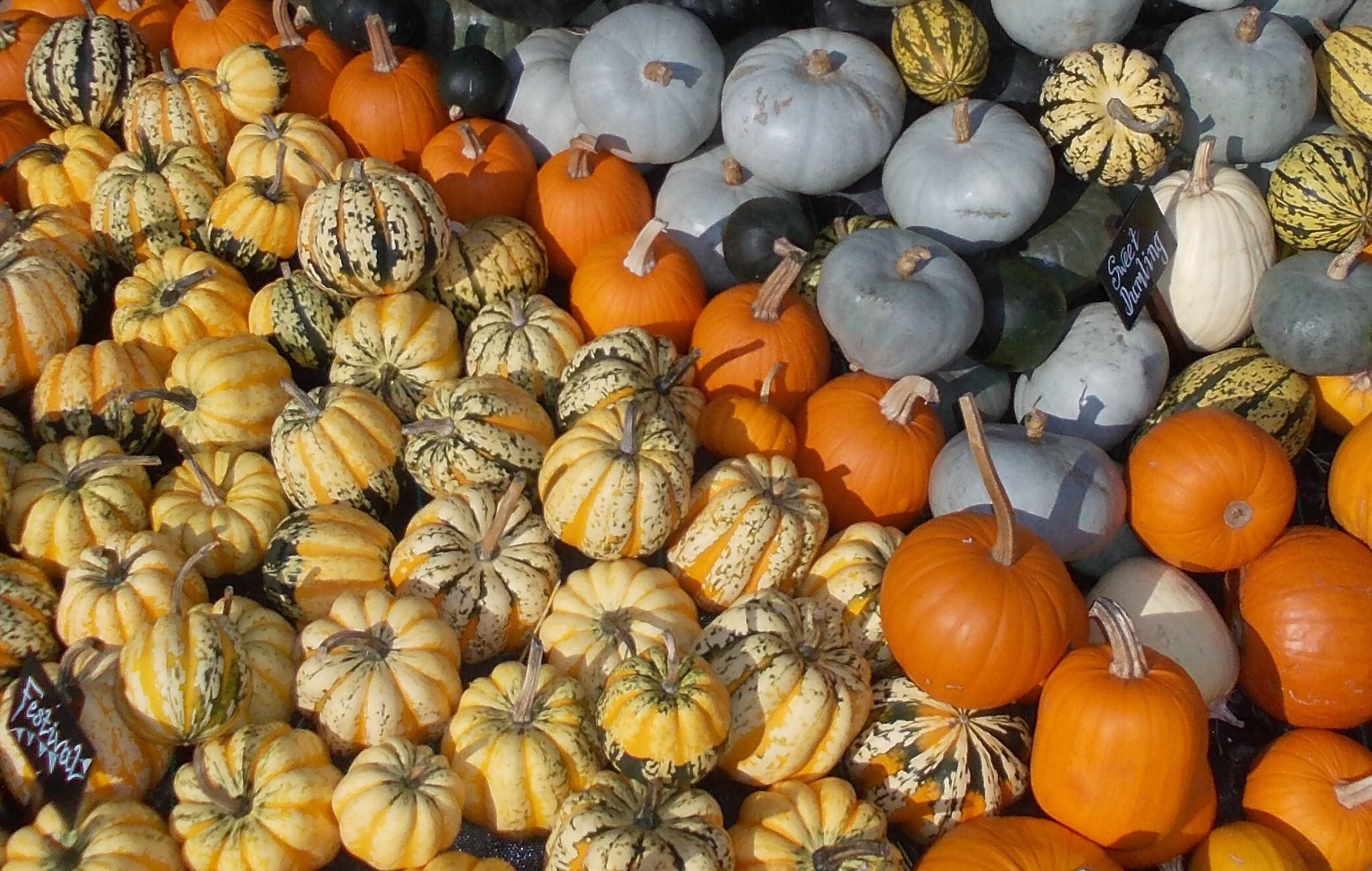
- Cucurbita fruits come in an assortment of colors and sizes.
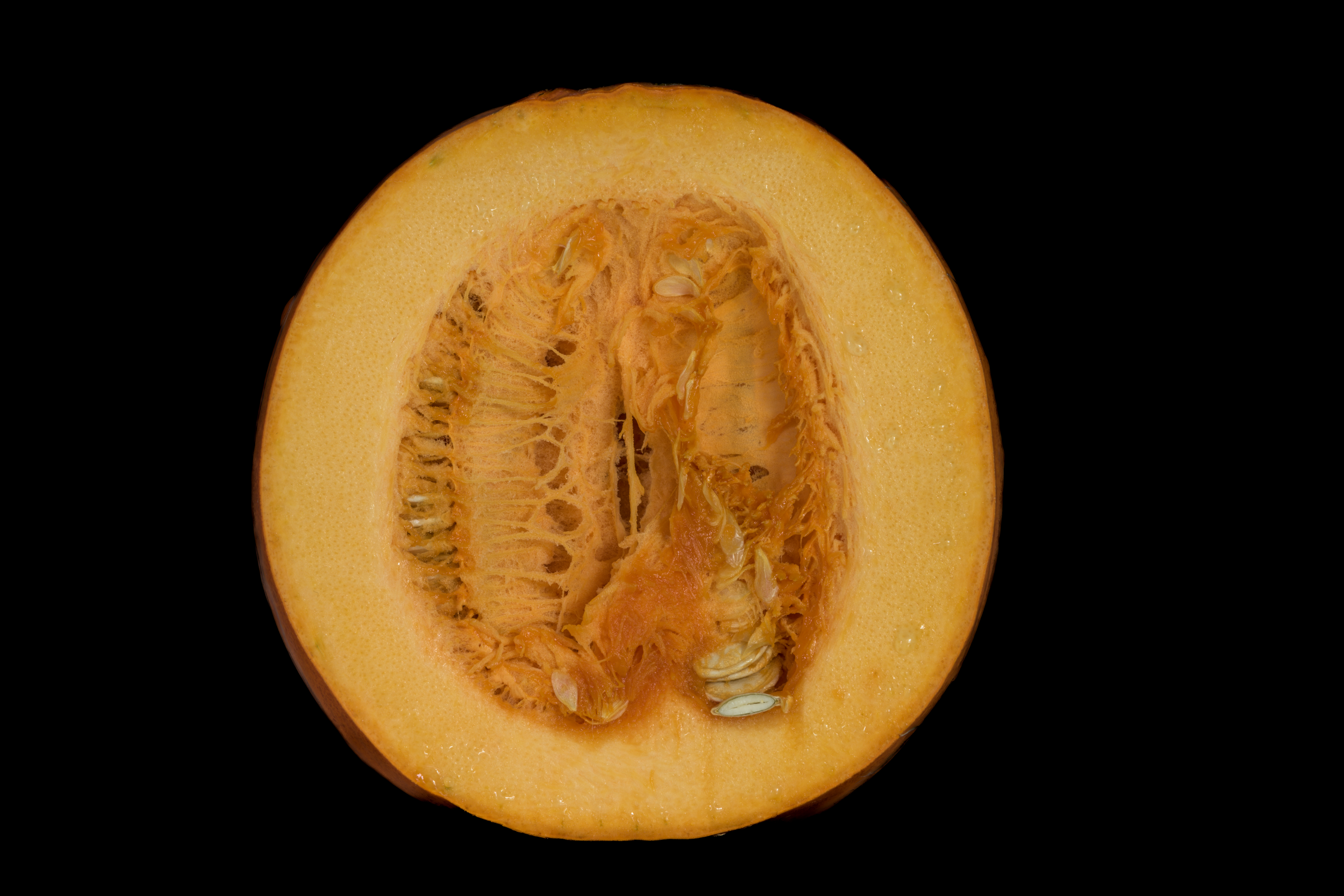
- Lengthwise section of a C. pepo pumpkin with the fine-textured flesh favored for making pumpkin pie

Scientific classification
- Kingdom: Plantae
- Clade: Tracheophytes
- Clade: Angiosperms
- Clade: Eudicots
- Clade: Rosids
- Order: Cucurbitales
- Family: Cucurbitaceae
- Tribe: Cucurbiteae
- Genus: Cucurbita; L.

Synonyms
- Melopepo Mill.; Ozodycus Raf.; Pepo Mill.; Pileocalyx Gasp.; Sphenantha Schrad.; Tristemon Scheele

= Cucurbita =

Squash

Genus of flowering plants

Cucurbita (Latin for 'gourd') is a genus, native to the Andes and Mesoamerica, of herbaceous fruits in the gourd family, Cucurbitaceae (also known as cucurbits or cucurbi). Five edible species are grown and consumed for their flesh and seeds. They are variously known as squash, pumpkin, or gourd, depending on species, variety, and local parlance. (Note: Due to wide variation in how the terms squash, pumpkin, and gourd are used, even among academics, in this article, the term squash can refer to any member of the genus Cucurbita. Pumpkin and gourd are used to refer to species, varieties, and cultivars commonly referred to by those terms.) Other kinds of gourd, also called bottle gourds, are native to Africa and belong to the genus Lagenaria, which is in the same family and subfamily as Cucurbita, but in a different tribe; their young fruits are eaten much like those of the Cucurbita species.

There is debate about the taxonomy of the genus, and the number of accepted species varies from 13 to 30. The five domesticated species are Cucurbita argyrosperma, C. ficifolia, C. maxima, C. moschata, and C. pepo, all of which can be treated as winter squash because the full-grown fruits can be stored for months. However, C. pepo includes some cultivars that are better used only as summer squash.

Most Cucurbita species are herbaceous vines that grow several meters in length and have tendrils, but non-vining "bush" cultivars of C. pepo and C. maxima have also been developed. The yellow or orange flowers on a Cucurbita plant are of two types: female and male. The female flowers produce the fruit and the male flowers produce pollen. Many North and Central American species are visited by specialist bee pollinators, but other insects with more general feeding habits, such as honey bees, also visit.

The fruits of the genus Cucurbita are good sources of nutrients, such as vitamins A and C, among other nutrients according to species. The fruits have many culinary uses including pumpkin pie, biscuits, bread, desserts, puddings, beverages, and soups; they are now cultivated worldwide. Although botanical fruits, Cucurbita gourds such as squash are typically cooked and eaten as vegetables. Pumpkins see more varied use, and are eaten both as vegetables and as desserts such as pumpkin pie.

== Description ==
Cucurbita species fall into two main groups. The first consists of annual or short-lived perennial vines which are mesophytic, meaning they require a more or less continuous water supply. The second group are perennials growing in arid zones which are xerophytic, meaning they tolerate dry conditions. Cultivated Cucurbita species were derived from the first group. Growing 5 to 15 meters (15 to 50 feet) in height or length, the plant stem produces tendrils to help it climb adjacent plants and structures or extend along the ground. Most species do not readily root from the nodes; a notable exception is C. ficifolia, and the four other cultivated mesophytes do this to a lesser extent. The vine of the perennial Cucurbita can become semiwoody if left to grow. There is wide variation in size, shape, and color among Cucurbita fruits, and even within a single species. C. ficifolia is an exception, being highly uniform in appearance. The morphological variation in the species C. pepo and C. maxima is so vast that its various subspecies and cultivars have been misidentified as totally separate species.

The typical cultivated Cucurbita species has five-lobed or palmately divided leaves with long petioles, with the leaves alternately arranged on the stem. The stems in some species are angular. All of the above-ground parts may be hairy with various types of trichomes, which are often hardened and sharp. Spring-like tendrils grow from each node and are branching in some species. C. argyrosperma has ovate-cordate (egg-shaped to heart-shaped) leaves. The shape of C. pepo leaves varies widely. C. moschata plants can have light or dense pubescence. C. ficifolia leaves are slightly angular and have light pubescence. The leaves of all four of these species may or may not have white spots.

The species are monoecious, with unisexual male (staminate) and female (pistillate) flowers on a single plant and these grow singly, appearing from the leaf axils. Flowers have five fused yellow to orange petals (the corolla) and a green bell-shaped calyx. Male flowers in Cucurbitaceae generally have five stamens, but in Cucurbita there are only three, and their anthers are joined so that there appears to be one. Female flowers have thick pedicels, and an inferior ovary with 3–5 stigmas that each have two lobes. The female flowers of C. argyrosperma and C.ficifolia have larger corollas than the male flowers. Female flowers of C. pepo have a small calyx, but the calyx of C. moschata male flowers is comparatively short.

Cucurbita fruits are large and fleshy. Botanists classify the Cucurbita fruit as a pepo, which is a special type of berry derived from an inferior ovary, with a thick outer wall or rind with hypanthium tissue forming an exocarp around the ovary, and a fleshy interior composed of mesocarp and endocarp. The term "pepo" is used primarily for Cucurbitaceae fruits, where this fruit type is common, but the fruits of Passiflora and Carica are sometimes also pepos. The seeds, which are attached to the ovary wall (parietal placentation) and not to the center, are large and fairly flat with a large embryo that consists almost entirely of two cotyledons. Fruit size varies considerably: wild fruit specimens can be as small as 4 centimeters (1 1/2 inches), while some domesticated specimens can weigh well over 300 kilograms (660 pounds). The current world record was set in 2026 by Ron Wallace of Rhode Island with a 1,432 kg (3,156 lb) pumpkin.

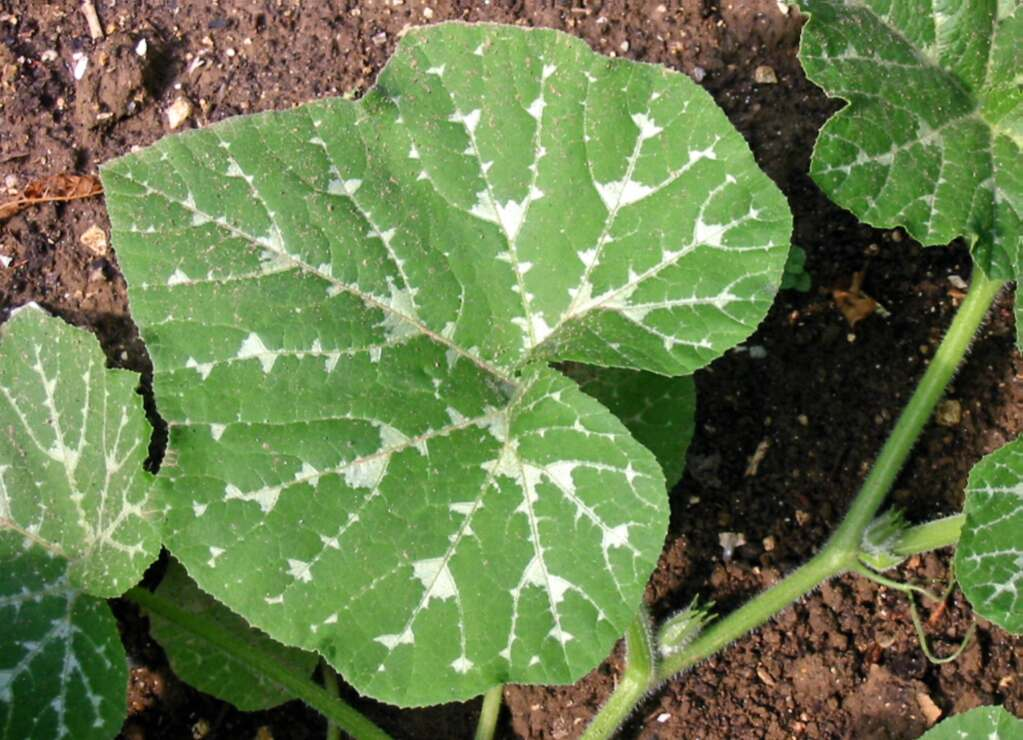
The leaves of Cucurbita moschata often have white spots near the veins.

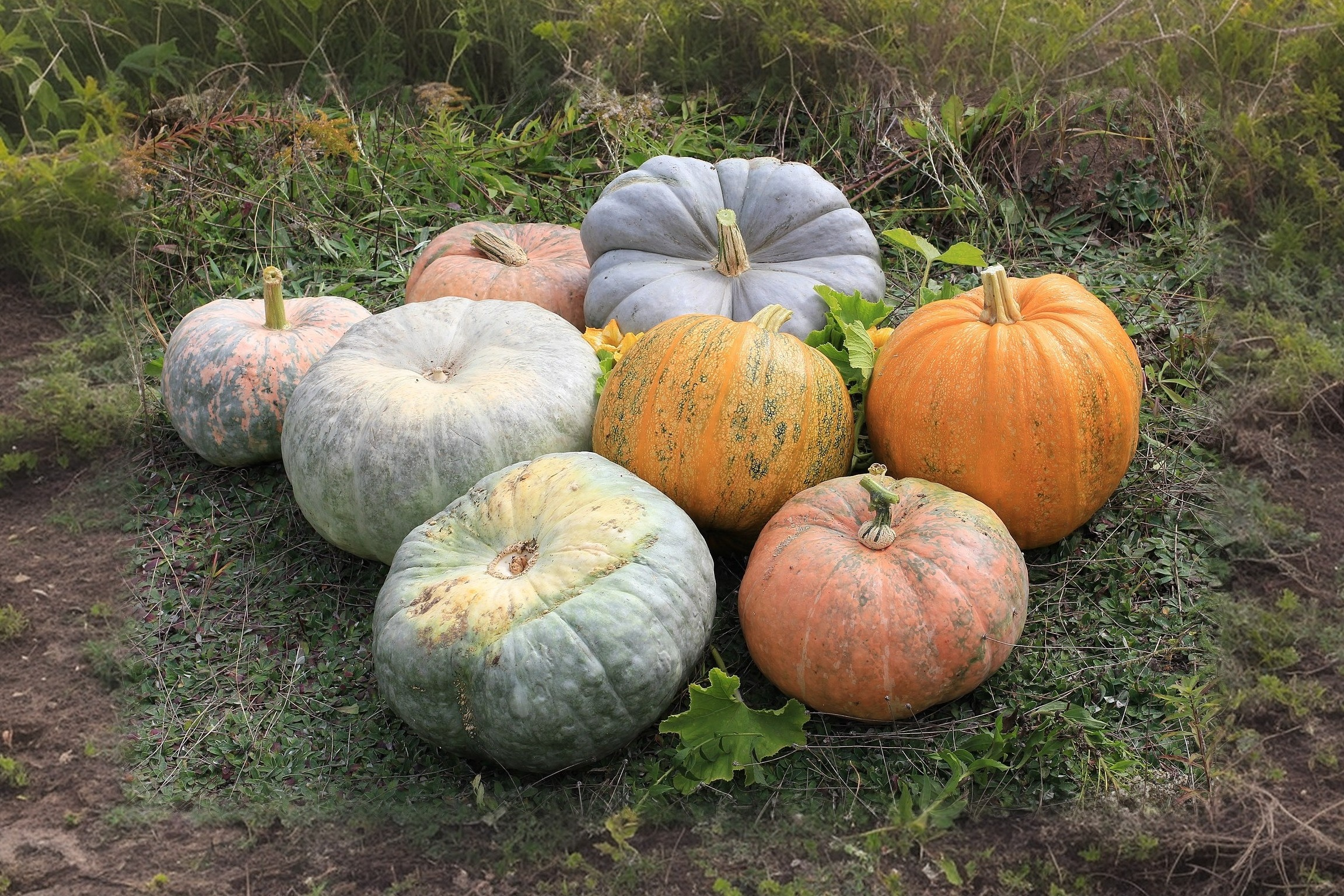
Two bright orange C. pepo pumpkins (center right), along with C. maxima squashes

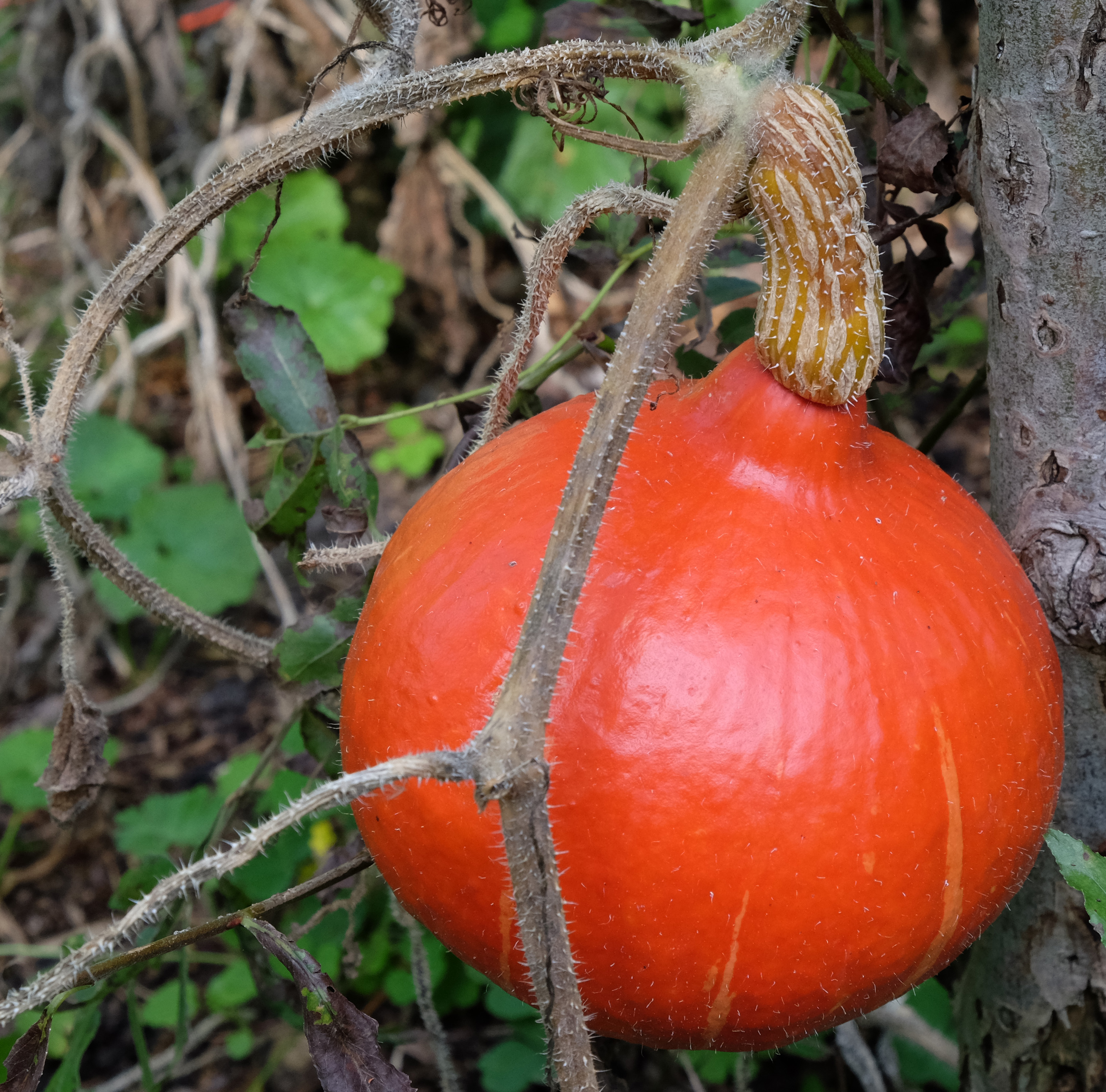
Stem, pedicel and fruit hairs of red kuri squash plant

=== Reproductive biology ===
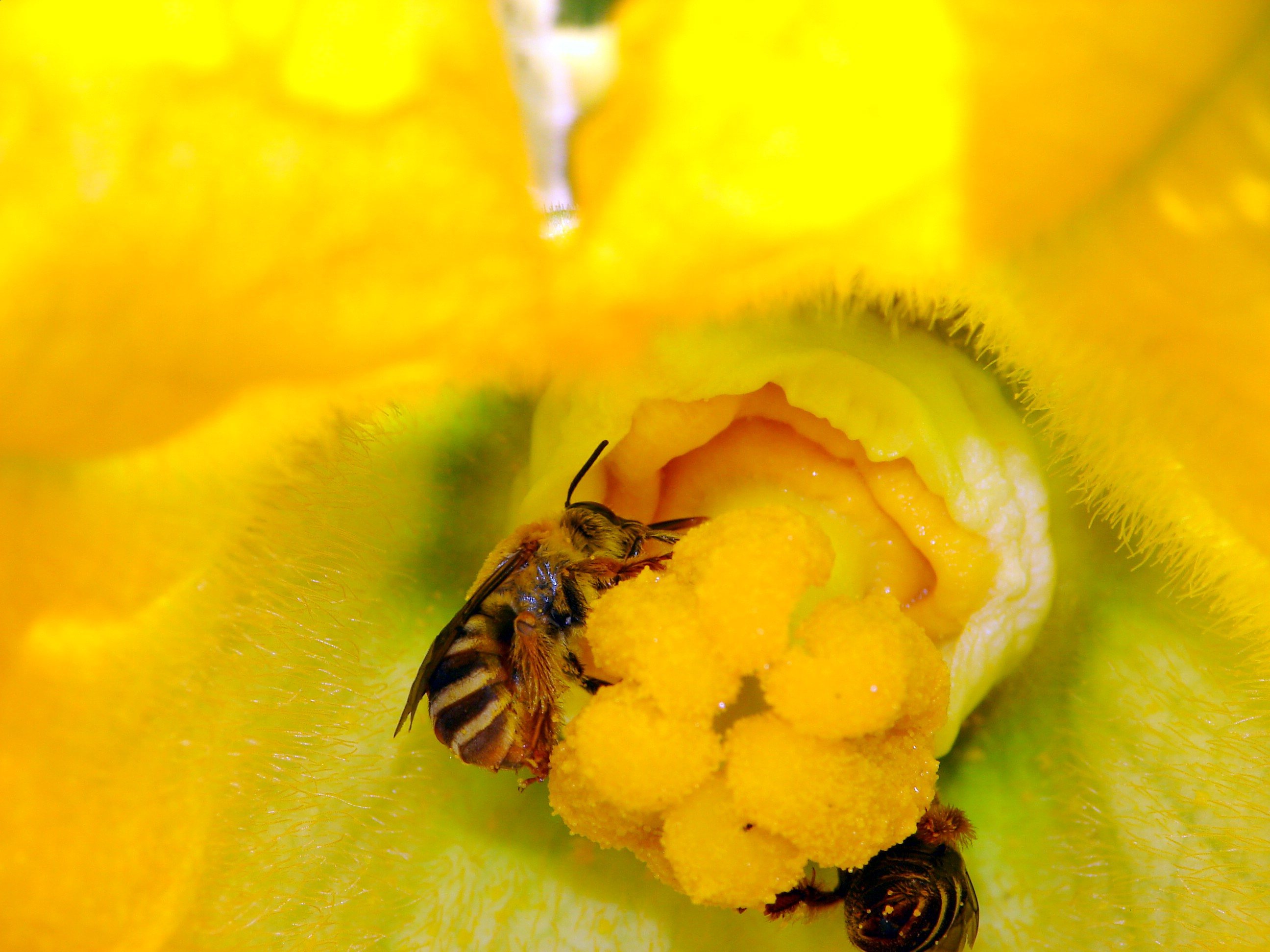
Cucurbita female flower with pollinating squash bees

All species of Cucurbita have 20 pairs of chromosomes.

Many North and Central American species are visited by specialist pollinators in the apid tribe Eucerini, especially the genera Peponapis and Xenoglossa, and these squash bees can be crucial to the flowers producing fruit after pollination.

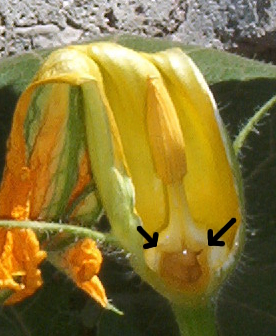
Male flower, part of the perianth removed, arrows indicating nectar pores

When there is more pollen applied to the stigma, more seeds are produced in the fruits and the fruits are larger with greater likelihood of maturation, an effect called xenia. Competitively grown specimens are therefore often hand-pollinated to maximize the number of seeds in the fruit. Seedlessness is known to occur in certain cultivars of C. pepo.

Critical factors in flowering and fruit set are physiological, having to do with the age of the plant and whether it already has developing fruit. The plant hormones ethylene and auxin are key in fruit set and development. Ethylene promotes the production of female flowers. When a plant already has a fruit developing, subsequent female flowers on the plant are less likely to mature, a phenomenon called "first-fruit dominance", and male flowers are more frequent, an effect that appears due to reduced natural ethylene production within the plant stem. Ethephon, a plant growth regulator product that is converted to ethylene after metabolism by the plant, can be used to increase fruit and seed production. Although Cucurbita species can generally produce healthy fruit after pollination from the same plant, inbreeding depression can significantly reduce seed number and fruit size.

The plant hormone gibberellin, produced in the stamens, is essential for the development of all parts of the male flowers. The development of female flowers is not yet understood. Gibberellin is also involved in other developmental processes of plants, such as seed and stem growth.

==== Germination and seedling growth ====
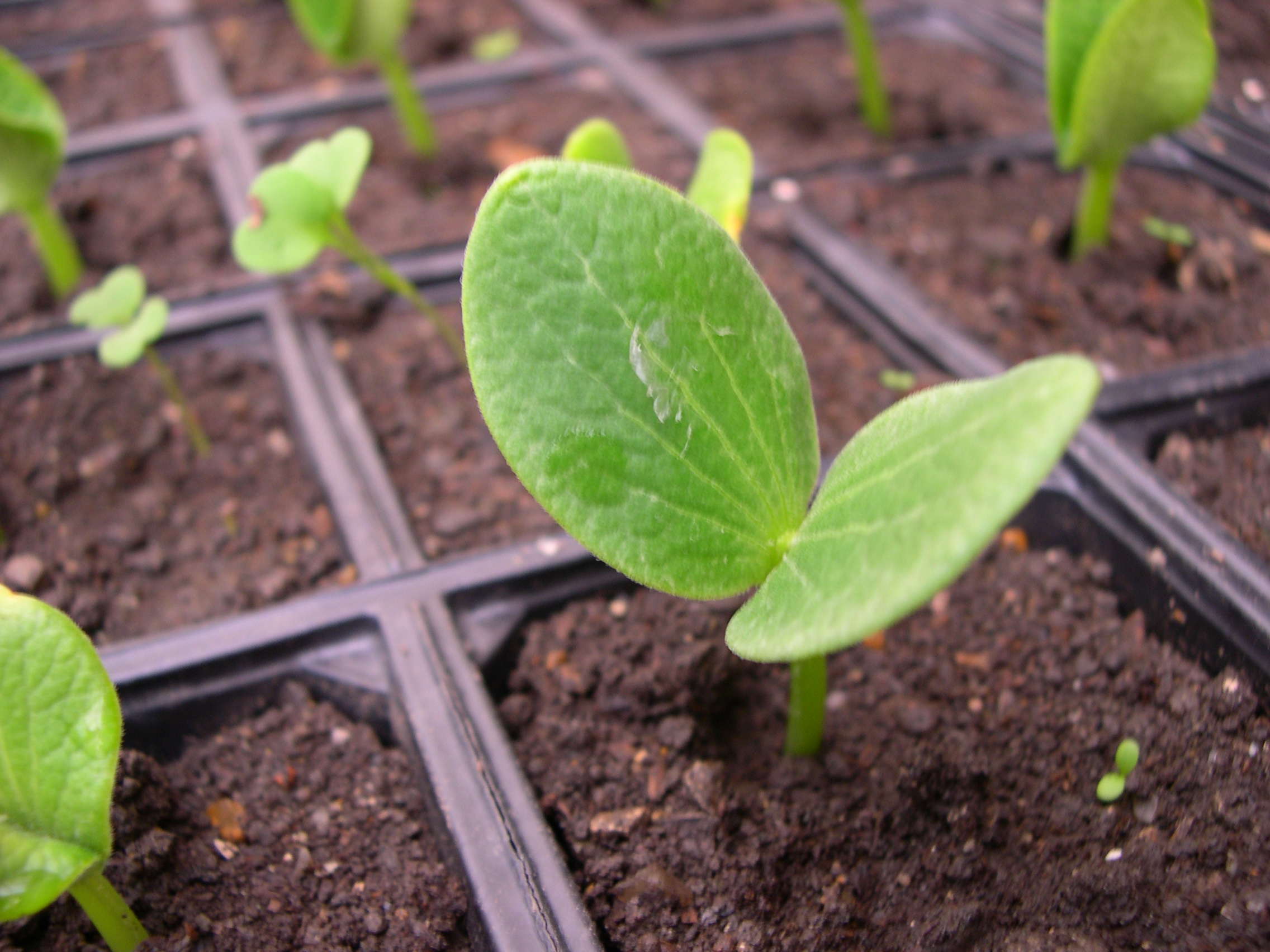
Kabocha seedling seven days after being sown

Seeds with maximum germination potential develop (in C. moschata) by 45 days after anthesis, and seed weight reaches its maximum 70 days after anthesis. Some varieties of C. pepo germinate best with eight hours of sunlight daily and a planting depth of 12 millimeters (1/2 in). Seeds planted deeper than 125 mm (5 in) are not likely to germinate. In C. foetidissima, a weedy species, plants younger than 19 days old are not able to sprout from the roots after removing the shoots. In a seed batch with 90 percent germination rate, over 90 percent of the plants had sprouted after 29 days from planting.

Experiments have shown that when more pollen is applied to the stigma, as well as the fruit containing more seeds and being larger (the xenia effect mentioned above), the germination of the seeds is also faster and more likely, and the seedlings are larger. Various combinations of mineral nutrients and light have a significant effect during the various stages of plant growth. These effects vary significantly between the different species of Cucurbita. A type of stored phosphorus called phytate forms in seed tissues as spherical crystalline intrusions in protein bodies called globoids. Along with other nutrients, phytate is used completely during seedling growth. Heavy metal contamination, including cadmium, has a significant negative impact on plant growth. Cucurbita plants grown in the spring tend to grow larger than those grown in the autumn.

== Taxonomy ==
Cucurbita was formally described in a way that meets the requirements of modern botanical nomenclature by Linnaeus in his Genera Plantarum, the fifth edition of 1754 in conjunction with the 1753 first edition of Species Plantarum. Cucurbita pepo is the type species of the genus. Linnaeus initially included the species C. pepo, C. verrucosa and C. melopepo (both now included in C. pepo), as well as C. citrullus (watermelon, now Citrullus lanatus) and C. lagenaria (now Lagenaria siceraria) (both are not Cucurbita but are in the family Cucurbitaceae.

The Cucurbita digitata, C. foetidissima, C. galeotti, and C. pedatifolia species groups are xerophytes, arid zone perennials with storage roots; the remainder, including the five domesticated species, are all mesophytic annuals or short-life perennials with no storage roots. The five domesticated species are mostly isolated from each other by sterility barriers and have different physiological characteristics. Some cross pollinations can occur: C. pepo with C. argyrosperma and C. moschata; and C. maxima with C. moschata. Cross pollination does occur readily within the family Cucurbitaceae. The buffalo gourd (C. foetidissima) has been used as an intermediary, as it can be crossed with all the common Cucurbita.

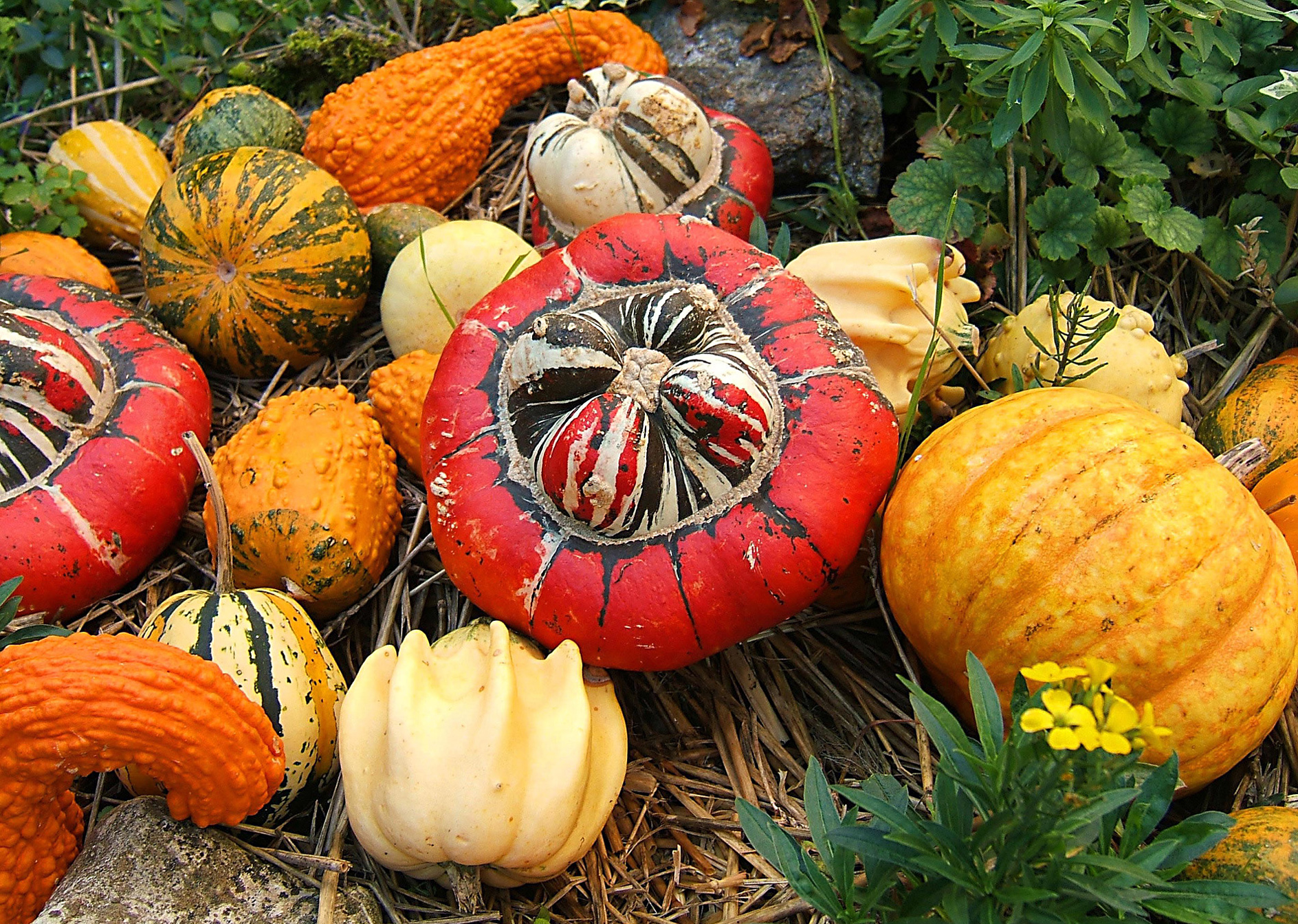
An assortment of fruits of C. maxima and C. pepo

Various taxonomic treatments have been proposed for Cucurbita, ranging from 13 to 30 species. In 1990, Cucurbita expert Michael Nee classified them into the following oft-cited 13 species groups (27 species total), listed by group and alphabetically, with geographic origin:

- C. argyrosperma (synonym C. mixta) – cushaw pumpkin; origin: Mexico
  - C. kellyana, origin: Pacific coast of western Mexico
  - C. palmeri, origin: Pacific coast of northwestern Mexico
  - C. sororia, origin: Pacific coast Mexico to Nicaragua, northeastern Mexico
- C. digitata – fingerleaf gourd; origin: southwestern United States (USA), northwestern Mexico
  - C. californica
  - C. cordata
  - C. cylindrata
  - C. palmata
- C. ecuadorensis, origin: Ecuador's Pacific coast
- C. ficifolia – figleaf gourd, chilacayote, alcayota; origin: Mexico, Panama, northern Chile and Argentina
- C. foetidissima – stinking gourd, buffalo gourd; origin: Mexico
  - C. scabridifolia, likely a natural hybrid of C. foetidissima and C. pedatifolia
- C. galeottii, little known; origin: Oaxaca, Mexico
- C. lundelliana, origin: Mexico, Guatemala, Belize
- C. maxima – winter squash, pumpkin; origin: Argentina, Bolivia, Ecuador
  - C. andreana, origin – Argentina
- C. moschata – butternut squash, 'Dickinson' pumpkin, golden cushaw; origin: Bolivia, Colombia, Ecuador, Mexico, Panama, Puerto Rico, Venezuela
- C. okeechobeensis, origin: Florida
  - C. martinezii, origin: Mexican Gulf Coast and foothills
- C. pedatifolia, origin: Querétaro, Mexico
  - C. moorei
- C. pepo – field pumpkin, summer squash, zucchini, vegetable marrow, courgette, acorn squash; origin: Mexico, US
  - C. fraterna, origin: Tamaulipas and Nuevo León, Mexico
  - C. texana, origin: Texas, US
- C. radicans – calabacilla, calabaza de coyote; origin: Central Mexico
  - C. gracilior

The taxonomy by Nee closely matches the species groupings reported in a pair of studies by a botanical team led by Rhodes and Bemis in 1968 and 1970 based on statistical groupings of several phenotypic traits of 21 species. Seeds for studying additional species members were not available. Sixteen of the 21 species were grouped into five clusters with the remaining five being classified separately:

- C. digitata, C. palmata, C. californica, C. cylindrata, C. cordata
- C. martinezii, C. okeechobeensis, C. lundelliana
- C. sororia, C. gracilior, C. palmeri; C. argyrosperma (reported as C. mixta) was considered close to the three previous species
- C. maxima, C. andreana
- C. pepo, C. texana
- C. moschata, C. ficifolia, C. pedatifolia, C. foetidissima, and C. ecuadorensis were placed in their own separate species groups as they were not considered significantly close to any of the other species studied.

=== Phylogeny ===
The full phylogeny of this genus is unknown, and research was ongoing in 2014. The following cladogram of Cucurbita phylogeny is based upon a 2002 study of mitochondrial DNA by Sanjur and colleagues.

- - Sechium edule
  - - C. ficifolia
    - - C. foetidissima
      - - - C. maxima and C. andreana
          - C. ecuadorensis
        - - C. martinezii
          - - C. pepo subspp. fraterna and ovifera
            - - C. pepo subsp. pepo
              - - C. sororia, in part
                - - C. moschata
                  - C. sororia, in part and C. argyrosperma

== Distribution and habitat ==
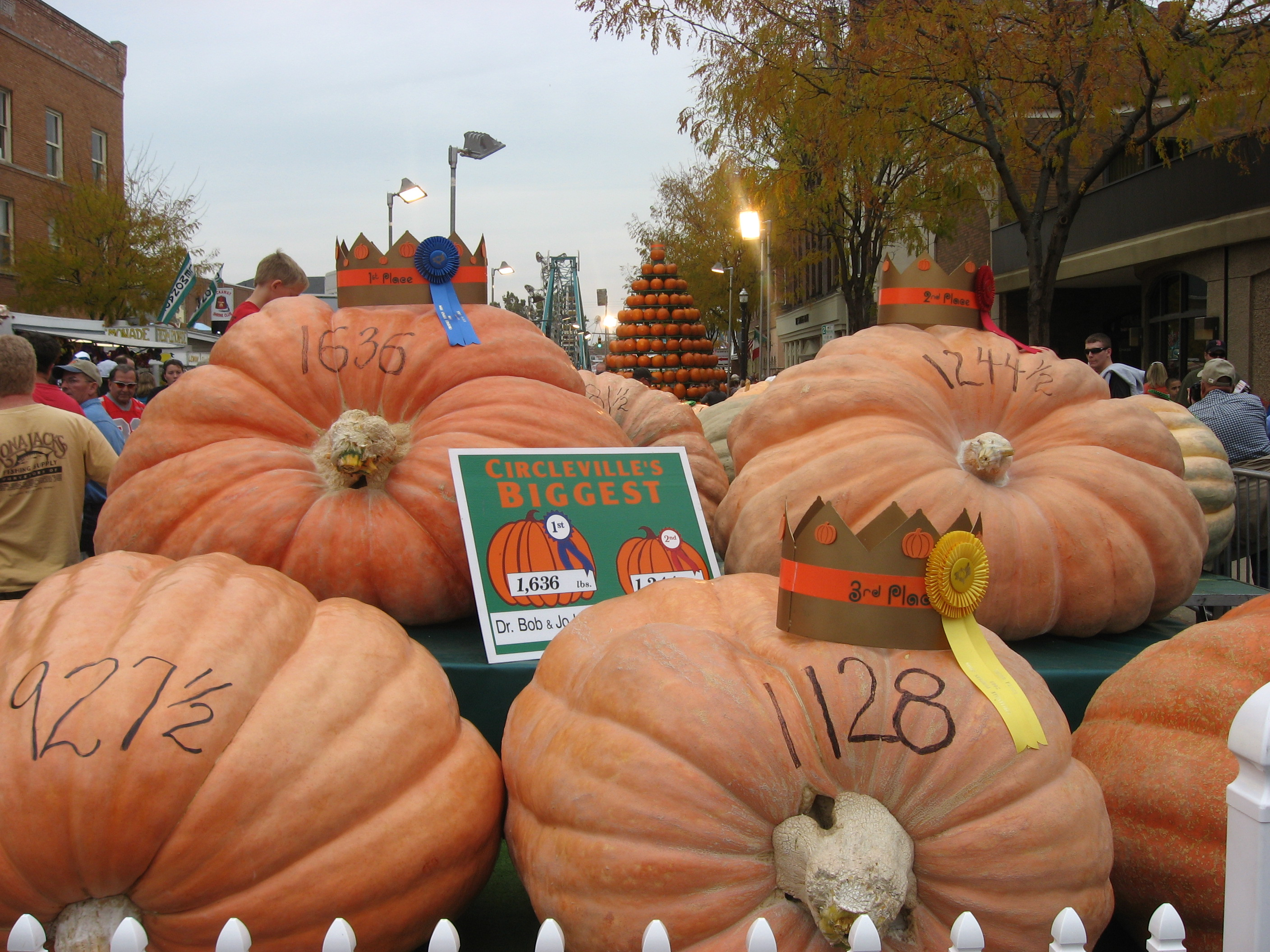
A festival-winning pumpkin in 2009 weighing 742 kilograms (1,636 lb)

The ancestral species of the genus Cucurbita were present in the Americas before the arrival of humans, and are native to the Americas. The likely center of origin is southern Mexico, spreading south through what is now known as Mesoamerica, into South America, and north to what is now the southwestern United States. Evolutionarily speaking, the genus is relatively recent in origin, dating back to the Holocene, whereas the family Cucurbitaceae, represented in Bryonia-like seeds, dates to the Paleocene. Recent genomic studies support the idea that the Cucurbita genus underwent a whole-genome duplication event, increasing the number of chromosomes and accelerating the rate at which their genomes evolve relative to other cucurbits. No species within the genus is entirely genetically isolated. C. moschata can intercross with all Cucurbita species, though the hybrid offspring may not be fertile unless they become polyploid.

Evidence of domestication of Cucurbita goes back over 8,000 years from the southernmost parts of Canada down to Argentina and Chile. Centers of domestication stretch from the Mississippi River watershed and Texas down through Mexico and Central America to northern and western South America. Of the 27 species that Nee delineates, five are domesticated. Four of these, C. argyrosperma, C. ficifolia, C. moschata, and C. pepo, originated and were domesticated in Mesoamerica; the fifth, C. maxima, originated and was domesticated in South America.

Within C. pepo, the pumpkins, the scallops, and possibly the crooknecks are ancient and were domesticated at different times and places. The domesticated forms of C. pepo have larger fruits than non-domesticated forms and seeds that are larger but fewer in number. In a 1989 study on the origins and development of C. pepo, botanist Harry Paris suggested that the original wild specimen had a small round fruit and that the modern pumpkin is its direct descendant. He suggested that the crookneck, ornamental gourd, and scallop are early variants and that the acorn squash is a cross between the scallop and the pumpkin.

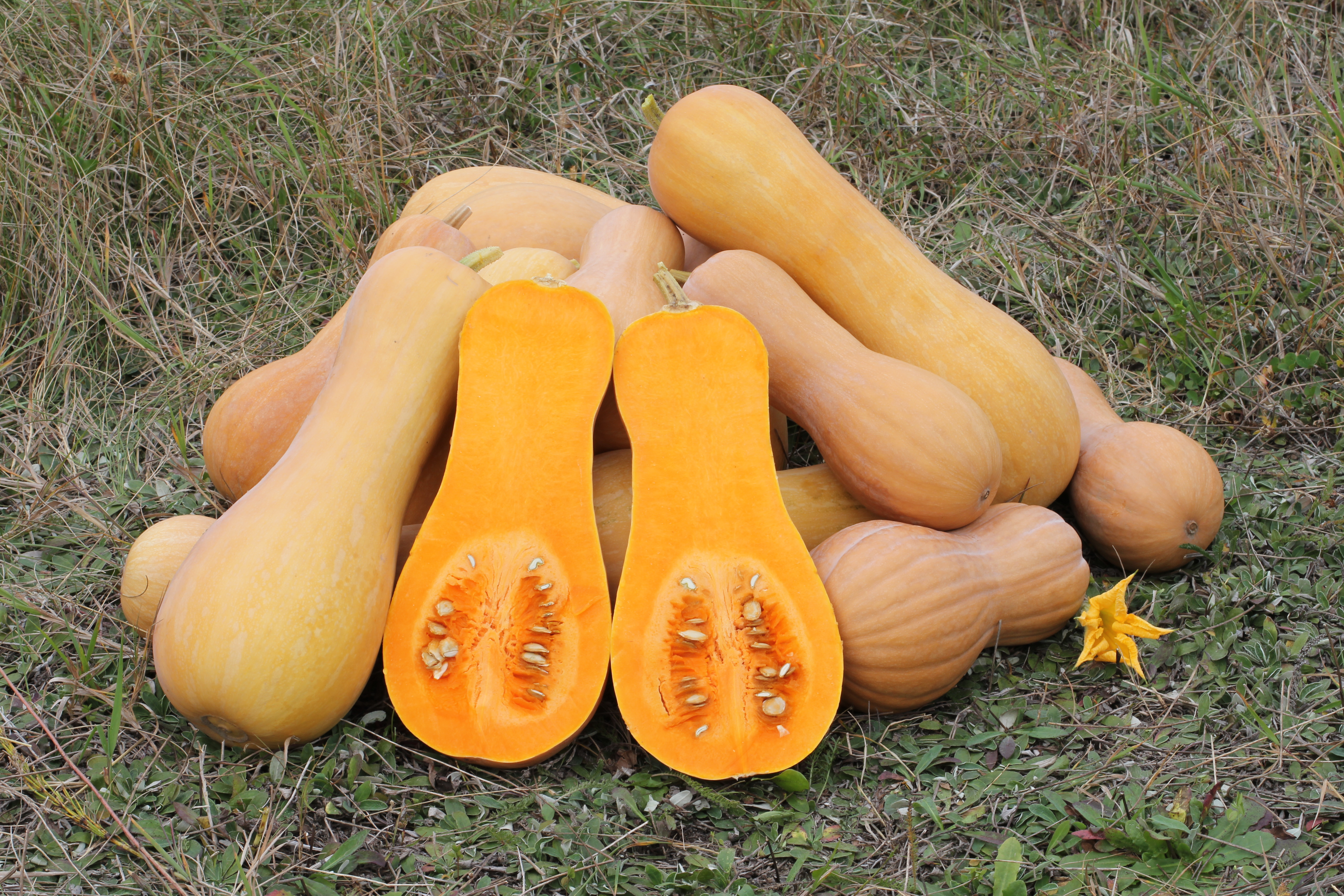
C. moschata 'Butternut'

C. argyrosperma is not as widespread as the other species. The wild form C. a. subsp. sororia is found from Mexico to Nicaragua, and cultivated forms are used in a somewhat wider area stretching from Panama to the southeastern United States. It was probably bred for its seeds, which are large and high in oil and protein, but its flesh is of poorer quality than that of C. moschata and C. pepo. It is grown in a wide altitudinal range: from sea level to as high as 1,800 meters (5,900 ft) in dry areas, usually with the use of irrigation, or in areas with a defined rainy season, where seeds are sown in May and June.

C. ficifolia and C. moschata were originally thought to be Asiatic in origin, but this has been disproven. The origin of C. ficifolia is Latin America, most likely southern Mexico, Central America, or the Andes. It grows at elevations ranging from 1,000 to 3,000 meters (3,300 to 9,800 ft) in areas with heavy rainfall. It does not hybridize well with other cultivated species as it has significantly different enzymes and chromosomes.

C. maxima originated in South America over 4,000 years ago, probably in Argentina and Uruguay. The plants are sensitive to frost, and they prefer both bright sunlight and soil with a pH of 6.0 to 7.0. C. maxima did not start to spread into North America until after the arrival of Columbus. Varieties were in use by native peoples of the United States by the 16th century. Types of C. maxima include triloba, zapallito, zipinka, Banana, Delicious, Hubbard, Marrow (C. maxima Marrow), Show, and Turban.

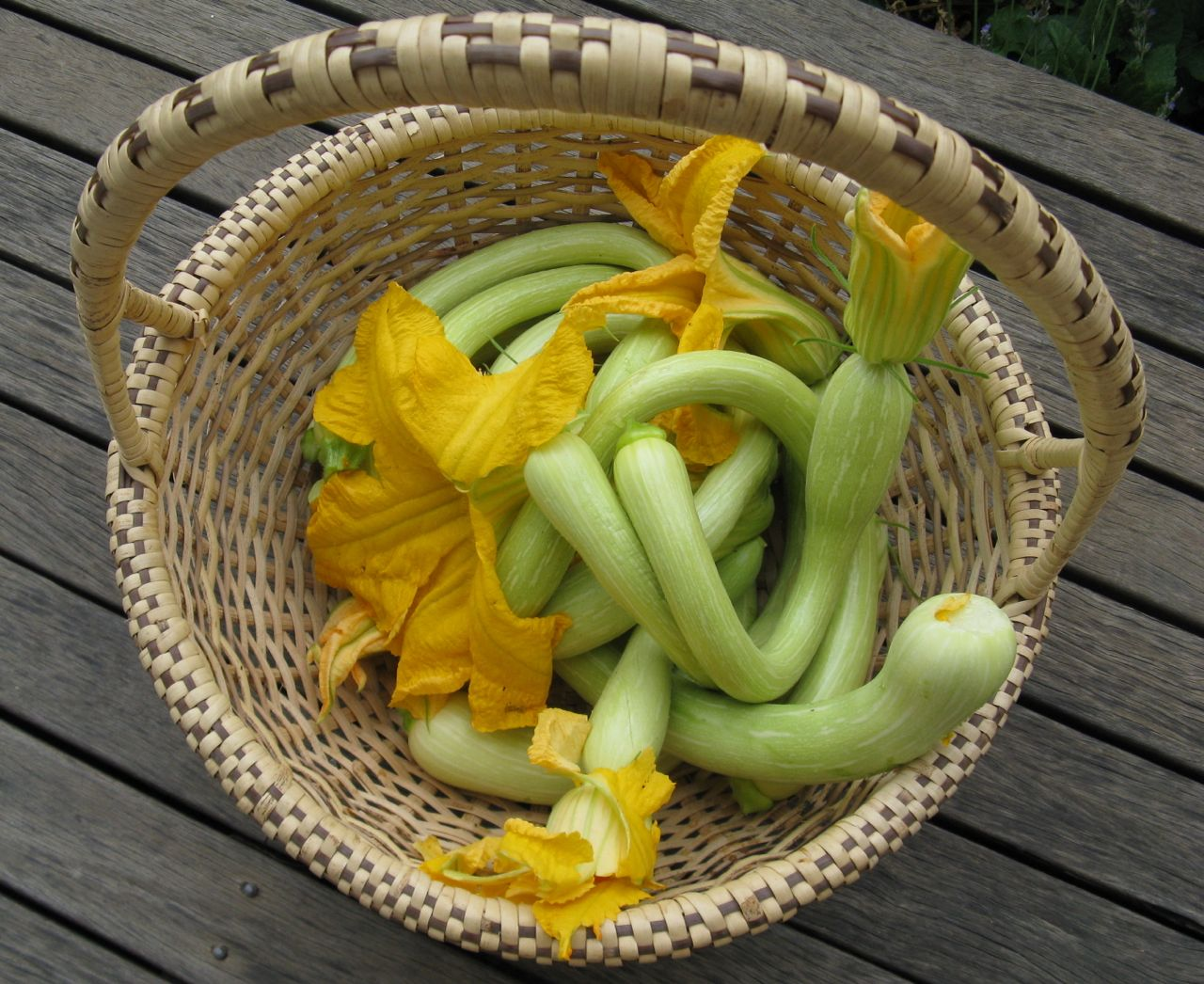
Fruit of the 'Tromboncino' cultivar of the Crookneck (C. moschata) Group are eaten either when very young, or as mature winter squash.

C. moschata is native to Latin America, but the precise location of origin is uncertain. It has been present in Mexico, Belize, Guatemala, and Peru for 4,000–6,000 years and has spread to Bolivia, Ecuador, Panama, Puerto Rico, and Venezuela. This species is closely related to C. argyrosperma. A variety known as the Seminole Pumpkin has been cultivated in Florida since before the arrival of Columbus. Its leaves are 20 to 30 centimeters (8 to 12 in) wide. It generally grows at low elevations in hot climates with heavy rainfall, but some varieties have been found above 2,200 meters (7,200 ft). Groups of C. moschata include Cheese, Crookneck (C. moschata), and Bell.

C. pepo is one of the oldest, if not the oldest, domesticated species with the oldest known locations being Oaxaca, Mexico, 8,000–10,000 years ago, and Ocampo, Tamaulipas, Mexico, about 7,000 years ago. It is known to have appeared in the US state of Missouri at least 4,000 years ago. Debates about the origin of C. pepo have been on-going since at least 1857. There have traditionally been two opposing theories about its origin: 1) that it is a direct descendant of C. texana and 2) that C. texana is merely feral C. pepo. A more recent theory by botanist Thomas Andres in 1987 is that descendants of C. fraterna hybridized with C. texana, resulting in two distinct domestication events in two different areas: one in Mexico and one in the eastern US, with C. fraterna and C. texana, respectively, as the ancestral species. C. pepo may have appeared in the Old World before moving from Mexico into South America. It is found from sea level to slightly above 2,000 meters (6,600 ft). Leaves have 3–5 lobes and are 20–35 centimeters (8–14 in) wide. All the subspecies, varieties, and cultivars are interfertile. In 1986 Paris proposed a revised taxonomy of the edible cultivated C. pepo based primarily on the shape of the fruit, with eight groups. All but a few C. pepo cultivars can be included in these groups. There is one non-edible cultivated variety: C. pepo var. ovifera.

A classification of cultivated C. pepo varieties based on Paris' eight groups and the one non-edible variety
Cultivar group	Botanical name	Image	Description
Acorn	C. pepo var. turbinata	Green acorn squashes	Winter squash, both a shrubby and creeping plant, obovoid or conical shape, pointed at the apex and with longitudinal grooves, thus resembling a spinning top, ex: Acorn squash
Cocozzelle	C. pepo var. Ionga	Slender green Cocozzelle squash	Summer squash, long round slender fruit that is slightly bulbous at the apex, similar to fastigata, ex: Cocozelle von tripolis
Crookneck	C. pepo var. torticollia (also torticollis)	Yellow curved squash	Summer squash, shrubby plant, with yellow, golden, or white fruit which is long and curved at the end and generally has a verrucose (wart-covered) rind, ex: Crookneck squash
Pumpkin	C. pepo var. pepo	Round orange pumpkin	Winter squash, creeping plant, round, oblate, or oval shape and round or flat on the ends, ex: Pumpkin; includes C. pepo subsp. pepo var. styriaca, used for Styrian pumpkin seed oil
Scallop	C. pepo var. clypeata; called C. melopepo by Linnaeus	Whitish round squash	Summer squash, prefers half-shrubby habitat, flattened or slightly discoidal shape, with undulations or equatorial edges, ex: Pattypan squash
Straightneck	C. pepo var. recticollis	Yellow straight squashes	Summer squash, shrubby plant, with yellow or golden fruit and verrucose rind, similar to var. torticollia but a stem end that narrows, ex: Straightneck squash
Vegetable marrow	C. pepo var. fastigata	White oval squash	Summer and winter squashes, creeper traits and a semi-shrub, cream to dark green color, short round fruit with a slightly broad apex, ex: Spaghetti squash (a winter variety)
Zucchini/Courgette	C. pepo var. cylindrica	Slender green squash	Summer squash, presently the most common group of cultivars, origin is recent (19th century), semi-shrubby, cylindrical fruit with a mostly consistent diameter, similar to fastigata, ex: Zucchini
Ornamental gourds	C. pepo var. ovifera	Squash that is that half yellow and half green	Non-edible, field squash closely related to C. texana, vine habitat, thin stems, small leaves, three sub-groups: C. pepo var. ovifera (egg-shaped, pear-shaped), C. pepo var. aurantia (orange color), and C. pepo var. verrucosa (round warty gourds), ornamental gourds found in Texas and called var. texana and ornamental gourds found outside of Texas (Illinois, Missouri, Arkansas, Oklahoma, and Louisiana) are called var. ozarkana

== Ecology ==
Cucurbita species are used as food plants by the larvae of some Lepidoptera species, including the cabbage moth (Mamestra brassicae), Hypercompe indecisa, and the turnip moth (Agrotis segetum). Cucurbita can be susceptible to the pest Bemisia argentifolii (silverleaf whitefly) as well as aphids (Aphididae), cucumber beetles (Acalymma vittatum and Diabrotica undecimpunctata howardi), squash bug (Anasa tristis), the squash vine borer (Melittia cucurbitae), and the two-spotted spidermite (Tetranychus urticae). The squash bug causes major damage to plants because of its very toxic saliva. The red pumpkin beetle (Aulacophora foveicollis) is a serious pest of cucurbits, especially the pumpkin, which it can defoliate. Cucurbits are susceptible to diseases such as bacterial wilt (Erwinia tracheiphila), anthracnose (Colletotrichum spp.), fusarium wilt (Fusarium spp.), phytophthora blight (Phytophthora spp. water molds), and powdery mildew (Erysiphe spp.). Defensive responses to viral, fungal, and bacterial leaf pathogens do not involve cucurbitacin.

Species in the genus Cucurbita are susceptible to some types of mosaic virus including: cucumber mosaic virus (CMV), papaya ringspot virus-cucurbit strain (PRSV), squash mosaic virus (SqMV), tobacco ringspot virus, watermelon mosaic virus, and zucchini yellow mosaic virus. PRSV is the only one of these viruses that does not affect all cucurbits. SqMV and CMV are the most common viruses among cucurbits. Symptoms of these viruses show a high degree of similarity, which often results in laboratory investigation being needed to differentiate which one is affecting plants.

== Cultivation ==
=== History ===
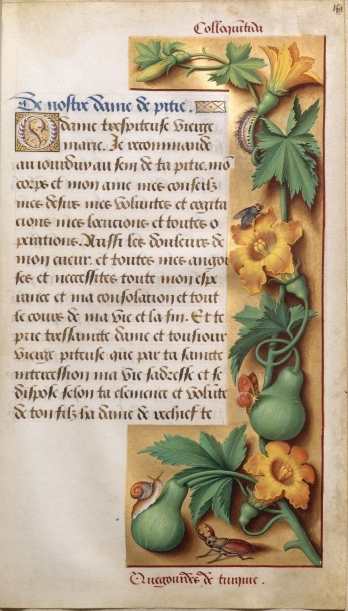
Cucurbita pepo subsp. texana, from the Grandes Heures of Anne of Brittany, 1503–1508, f. 161, earliest depiction of cucurbits in Europe

The genus was part of the culture of almost every native peoples group from southern South America to southern Canada. Modern-day cultivated Cucurbita are not found in the wild. Genetic studies of the mitochondrial gene nad1 show there were at least six independent domestication events of Cucurbita separating domestic species from their wild ancestors. Species native to North America include C. digitata (calabazilla), and C. foetidissima (buffalo gourd), C. palmata (coyote melon), and C. pepo. Some species, such as C. digitata and C. ficifolia, are referred to as gourds. Gourds, also called bottle gourds, which are used as utensils or vessels, belong to the genus Lagenaria and are native to Africa. Lagenaria are in the same family and subfamily as Cucurbita but in a different tribe.

The earliest known evidence of the domestication of Cucurbita dates back at least 8,000 years ago, predating the domestication of other crops such as maize and beans in the region by about 4,000 years. This evidence was found in the Guilá Naquitz cave in Oaxaca, Mexico, during a series of excavations in the 1960s and 1970s, possibly beginning in 1959. Solid evidence of domesticated C. pepo was found in the Guilá Naquitz cave in the form of increasing rind thickness and larger peduncles in the newer stratification layers of the cave. By c. 8,000 years Before Present, the C. pepo peduncles found are consistently more than 10 mm (3/8 in) thick. Wild Cucurbita peduncles are always below this 10-mm barrier. Changes in fruit shape and color indicate that intentional breeding of C. pepo had occurred by no later than 8,000 years BP. During the same time frame, average rind thickness increased from 0.84–1.15 mm (1/32–3/64 in). Recent genomic studies suggest that Cucurbita argyrosperma was domesticated in Mexico, in the region that is currently known as the state of Jalisco.

Squash was domesticated first, followed by maize and then beans, becoming part of the Three Sisters agricultural system of companion planting. The English word "squash" derives from askutasquash (a green thing eaten raw), a word from the Narragansett language, which was documented by Roger Williams, the founder of Rhode Island, in his 1643 publication A Key Into the Language of America. Similar words for squash exist in related languages of the Algonquian family.

Squash and gourd* production (2024)
Country	Production (millions of tonnes)
India	9.3
China	7.7
Egypt	1.3
Russia	1.2
Ukraine	1.1
United States	0.9
Bangladesh	0.8
Spain	0.8
Turkey	0.7
Italy	0.6
World	34.6
*includes pumpkins Source: FAOSTAT of the United Nations

=== Production ===
In 2024, the world production of squashes (including gourds and pumpkins) was 34.6 million tonnes, led by India with 27% of the total. China, Egypt and Russia were secondary producers.

== Toxicity ==
Cucurbitin is a naturally occurring amino acid and carboxy pyrrolidine present in raw Cucurbita seeds. It retards the development of parasitic flukes when administered to infected host mice, although the effect is seen only if administration begins immediately after infection.

Cucurmosin is a ribosome inactivating protein found in the flesh and seed of Cucurbita, notably Cucurbita moschata.

Cucurbitacin is a plant steroid present in wild Cucurbita and in each member of the family Cucurbitaceae. Poisonous to mammals, it is found in quantities sufficient to discourage herbivores. It makes wild Cucurbita and most ornamental gourds, with the exception of an occasional C. fraterna and C. sororia, bitter to taste. Ingesting too much cucurbitacin can cause stomach cramps, diarrhea and even collapse. This bitterness is especially prevalent in wild Cucurbita; in parts of Mexico, the flesh of the fruits is rubbed on a woman's breast to wean children. While the process of domestication has largely removed the bitterness from cultivated varieties, there are occasional reports of cucurbitacin causing illness in humans. Cucurbitacin is also used as a lure in insect traps.

== Uses ==
Summer squash, all varieties, raw
Nutritional value per 100 g (3.5 oz)
- Energy: 69 kJ (16 kcal)
- Carbohydrates: 3.4 g
- Sugars: 2.2 g
- Dietary fiber: 1.1 g
- Fat: 0.2 g
- Protein: 1.2 g
Vitamins and minerals
Vitamins	Quantity %DV^{†}
Vitamin A equiv. beta-Carotene lutein zeaxanthin	1% 10 μg 1% 120 μg 2125 μg
Thiamine (B1)	4% 0.048 mg
Riboflavin (B2)	11% 0.142 mg
Niacin (B3)	3% 0.487 mg
Pantothenic acid (B5)	3% 0.155 mg
Vitamin B6	13% 0.218 mg
Folate (B9)	7% 29 μg
Vitamin C	19% 17 mg
Vitamin K	3% 3 μg
Minerals	Quantity %DV^{†}
Iron	2% 0.35 mg
Magnesium	4% 17 mg
Manganese	8% 0.175 mg
Phosphorus	3% 38 mg
Potassium	9% 262 mg
Zinc	3% 0.29 mg
- Other constituents: Quantity
- Water: 95 g
- Link to USDA Database entry, for comparison, see values for raw pumpkin
- ^{†}Percentages estimated using US recommendations for adults, except for potassium, which is estimated based on expert recommendation from the National Academies.

=== Nutrition ===
As an example of Cucurbita, raw summer squash is 94% water, 3% carbohydrates, and 1% protein, with negligible fat content (table). In a 100-gram reference serving, raw squash supplies 69 kilojoules (16 kcal) of food energy and is rich in vitamin C (20% of the Daily Value), moderate in vitamin B6 and riboflavin (12–17% DV), but otherwise devoid of appreciable nutrient content, although the nutrient content of different Curcubita species may vary somewhat.

Pumpkin seeds contain vitamin E, crude protein, B vitamins and several dietary minerals (see nutrition table at pepita). Also present in pumpkin seeds are unsaturated and saturated oils, palmitic, oleic and linoleic fatty acids, as well as carotenoids.

=== Culinary ===
The family Cucurbitaceae has many species used as human food. Cucurbita species are some of the most important of those, with various species being prepared and eaten in many ways. Although the stems and skins tend to be more bitter than the flesh, the fruits and seeds of cultivated varieties are usually quite edible and need little or no preparation. Cross-pollination with toxic types can cause bitterness in plants of the next generation, and these should not be eaten. The flowers and young leaves and shoot tips can also be consumed. The seeds and fruits of most varieties can be stored for long periods of time, particularly the sweet-tasting winter varieties with their thick, inedible skins. Summer squash have a thin, edible skin. The seeds of both types can be roasted, eaten raw, made into pumpkin seed oil, ground into a flour or meal, or otherwise prepared. Squashes are primarily grown for the fresh food market.

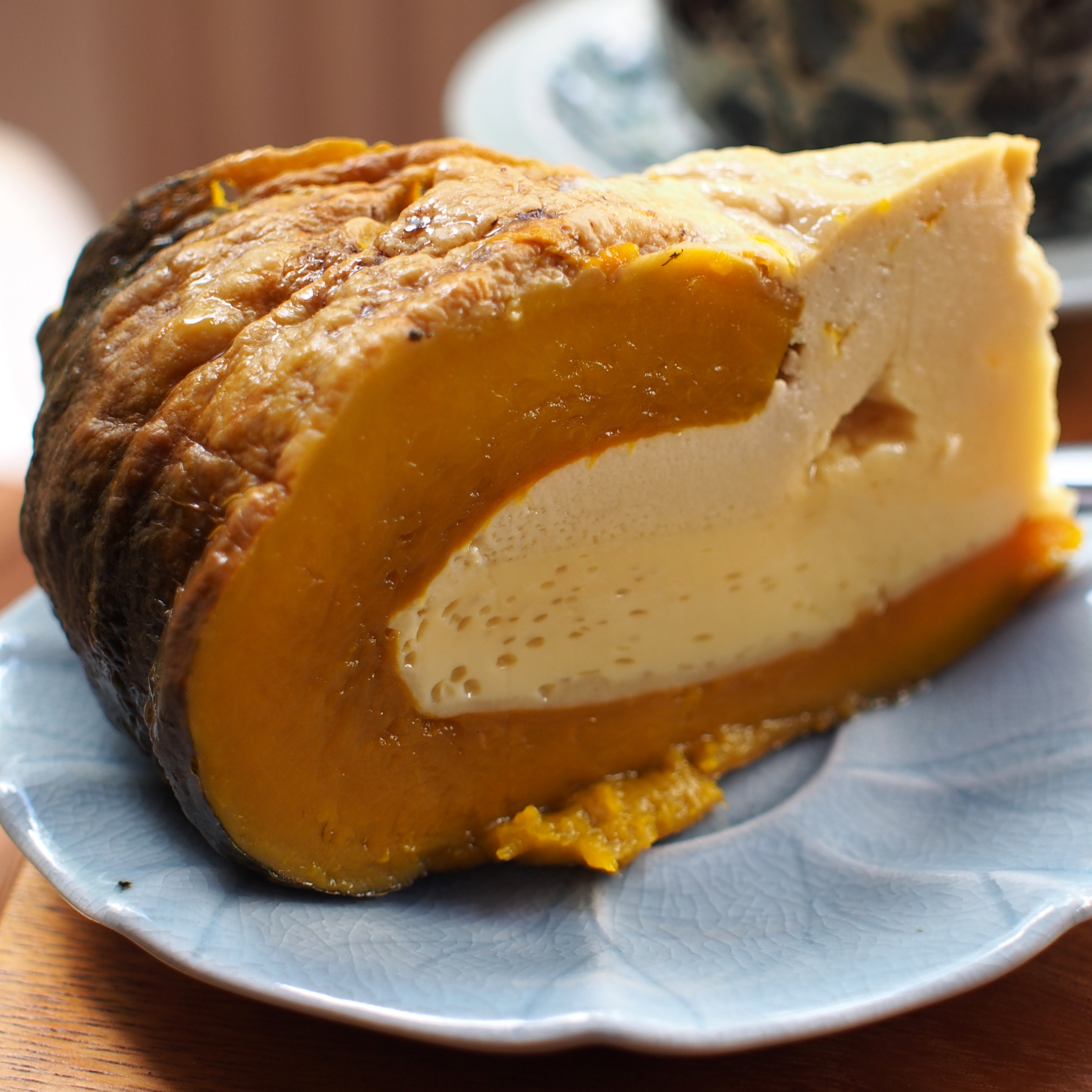
Pumpkin custard made from kabocha, a cultivated variant of C. maxima

Long before European contact, Cucurbita had been a major food source for the native peoples of the Americas. The species became an important food for European settlers, including the Pilgrims, who even featured it at the first Thanksgiving. Commercially produced pumpkin commonly used in pumpkin pie is most often varieties of C. moschata; Libby's, by far the largest producer of processed pumpkin, uses a proprietary strain of the Dickinson pumpkin variety of C. moschata for its canned pumpkin. Other foods that can be made using members of this genus include biscuits, bread, cheesecake, desserts, donuts, granola, ice cream, lasagna dishes, pancakes, pudding, pumpkin butter, salads, soups, and stuffing. Squash soup is a dish in African cuisine. The xerophytic species are proving useful in the search for nutritious foods that grow well in arid regions. C. ficifolia is used to make soft and mildly alcoholic drinks.

In India, squashes (ghiya) are cooked with seafood such as prawns. In France, marrows (courges) are traditionally served as a gratin, sieved and cooked with butter, milk, and egg, and flavored with salt, pepper, and nutmeg, and as soups. In Italy, zucchini and larger squashes are served in a variety of regional dishes, such as cocuzze alla puviredda cooked with olive oil, salt and herbs from Apulia; as torta di zucca from Liguria, or torta di zucca e riso from Emilia-Romagna, the squashes being made into a pie filling with butter, ricotta, Parmesan, egg, and milk; and as a sauce for pasta in dishes like spaghetti alle zucchine from Sicily. In Japan, squashes such as small C. moschata pumpkins (kabocha) are eaten boiled with sesame sauce, fried as a tempura dish, or made into balls with sweet potato and Japanese mountain yam.

== In culture ==
=== Art, music, and literature ===
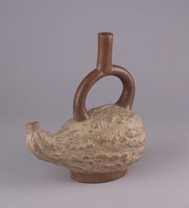
Moche squash ceramic (300 CE, Larco Museum)

Along with maize and beans, squash has been depicted in the art work of the native peoples of the Americas for at least 2,000 years. For example, cucurbits are often represented in Moche ceramics.

Though native to the western hemisphere, Cucurbita began to spread to other parts of the world after Christopher Columbus's arrival in the New World in 1492. Until recently, the earliest known depictions of this genus in Europe was of Cucurbita pepo in De Historia Stirpium Commentarii Insignes in 1542 by the German botanist Leonhart Fuchs, but in 1992, two paintings, one of C. pepo and one of C. maxima, painted between 1515 and 1518, were identified in festoons at Villa Farnesina in Rome. Also, in 2001 depictions of this genus were identified in Grandes Heures of Anne of Brittany (Les Grandes Heures d'Anne de Bretagne), a French devotional book, an illuminated manuscript created between 1503 and 1508. This book contains an illustration known as Quegourdes de turquie, which was identified by cucurbit specialists as C. pepo subsp. texana in 2006.

In 1952, Stanley Smith Master, using the pen name Edrich Siebert, wrote "The Marrow Song (Oh what a beauty!)" to a tune in 6/8 time. It became a popular hit in Australia in 1973, and was revived by the Wurzels in Britain on their 2003 album Cutler of the West. John Greenleaf Whittier wrote a poem entitled The Pumpkin in 1850. "The Great Pumpkin" is a fictional holiday figure in the comic strip Peanuts by Charles M. Schulz.

=== Cleansing and personal care uses ===
C. foetidissima contains a saponin that can be obtained from the fruit and root. This can be used as a soap, shampoo, and bleach. Prolonged contact can cause skin irritation. Pumpkin is also used in cosmetics.

=== Folk remedies ===
Cucurbita have been used in various cultures as folk remedies. Pumpkins have been used by Native Americans to treat intestinal worms and urinary ailments. This Native American remedy was adopted by American doctors in the early nineteenth century as an anthelmintic for the expulsion of worms. In southeastern Europe, seeds of C. pepo were used to treat irritable bladder and benign prostatic hyperplasia. In Germany, pumpkin seed is approved for use by the Commission E, which assesses folk and herbal medicine, for irritated bladder conditions and micturition problems of prostatic hyperplasia stages 1 and 2, although the monograph published in 1985 noted a lack of pharmacological studies that could substantiate empirically found clinical activity. The US Food and Drug Administration, on the other hand, banned the sale of all such non-prescription drugs for the treatment of prostate enlargement in 1990.

In China, C. moschata seeds were also used in traditional Chinese medicine for the treatment of the parasitic disease schistosomiasis and for the expulsion of tape worms. In Mexico, herbalists use C. ficifolia in the belief that it reduces blood sugar levels.

=== Festivals ===
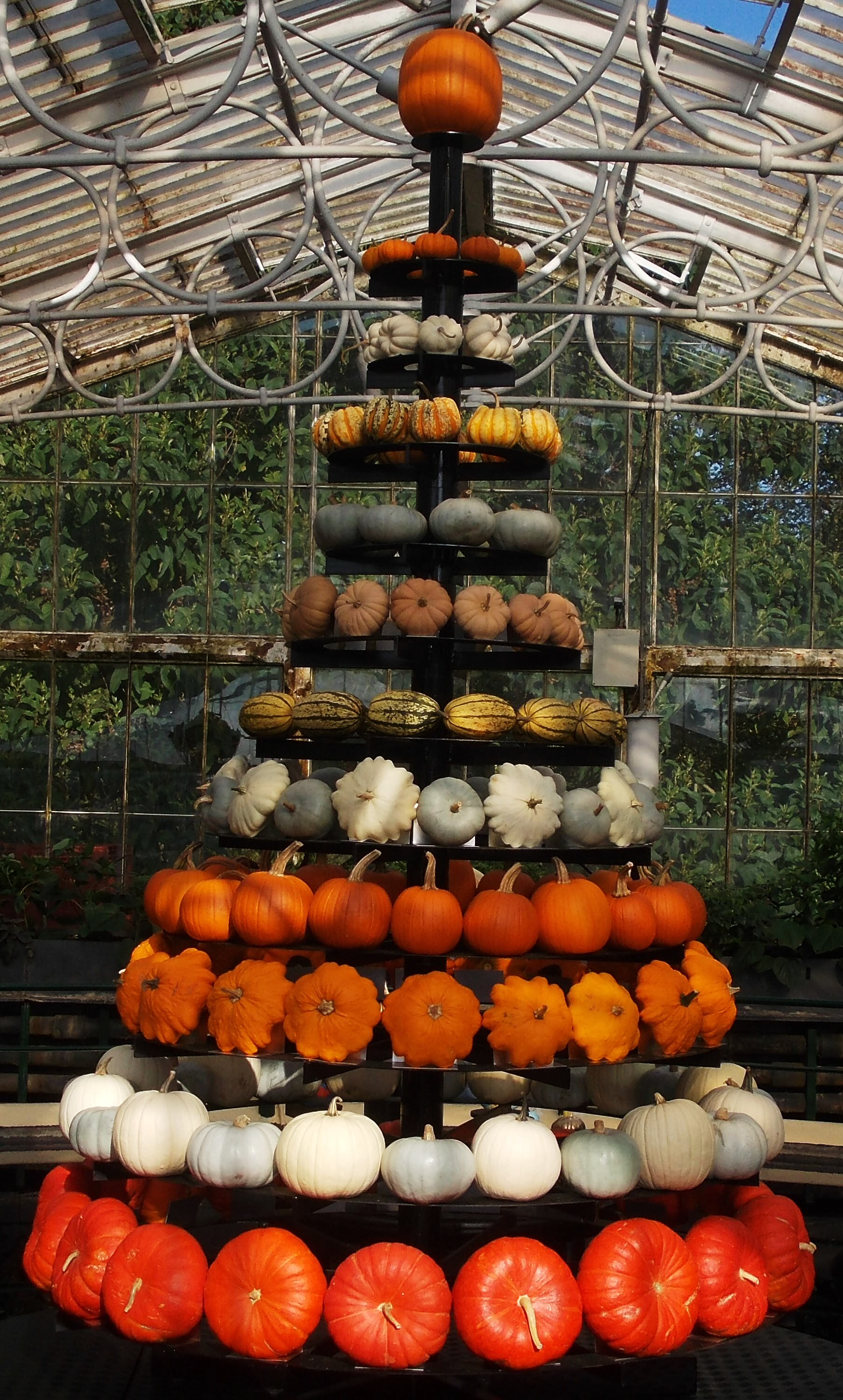
A pyramid of squashes in the Waterlily House, Kew Gardens, 2013

Cucurbita fruits including pumpkins and marrows are celebrated in festivals in countries such as Austria, Bolivia, Britain, Canada, Croatia, France, Italy, Japan, Peru, Portugal, Spain, Switzerland, and the United States. Argentina holds an annual nationwide pumpkin festival Fiesta Nacional del Zapallo (lit. 'Squashes and Pumpkins National Festival'), in Ceres, Santa Fe, on the last day of which a Reina Nacional del Zapallo (lit. 'National Queen of the Pumpkin') is chosen. In Portugal the Festival da Abóbora de Lourinhã e Atalaia ("Squashes and Pumpkins Festival in Lourinhã and Atalaia") is held in Lourinhã city, called the Capital Nacional da Abóbora (the "National Capital of Squashes and Pumpkins"). Ludwigsburg, Germany annually hosts the world's largest pumpkin festival. In Britain a giant marrow (zucchini) weighing 54.3177 kilograms (119 lb 12 oz) was displayed in the Harrogate Autumn Flower Show in 2012. In the US, pumpkin chucking is practiced competitively, with machines such as trebuchets and air cannons designed to throw intact pumpkins as far as possible. The Keene Pumpkin Fest is held annually in New Hampshire; in 2013 it held the world record for the most jack-o-lanterns lit in one place, 30,581 on October 19, 2013.

Halloween is widely celebrated with jack-o-lanterns made of large orange pumpkins carved with ghoulish faces and illuminated from inside with candles. The pumpkins used for jack-o-lanterns are C. pepo, not to be confused with the ones typically used for pumpkin pie in the United States, which are C. moschata. Kew Gardens marked Halloween in 2013 with a display of pumpkins, including a towering pyramid made of many varieties of squash, in the Waterlily House during its "IncrEdibles" festival.

== See also ==
- List of gourds and squashes in the genus Cucurbita
- List of squash and pumpkin dishes
