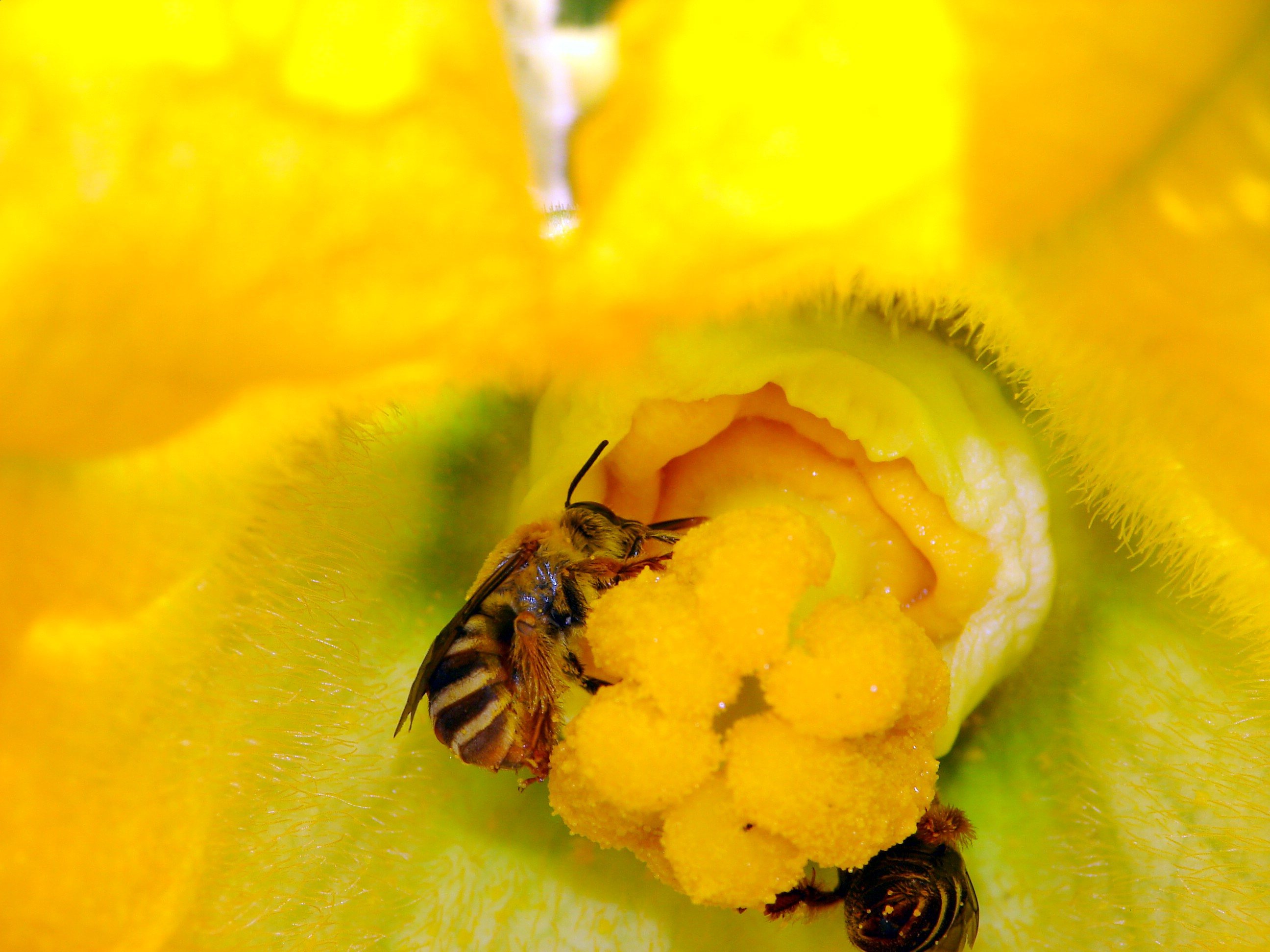
- Peponapis pruinosa

Scientific classification
- Kingdom: Animalia
- Phylum: Arthropoda
- Clade: Pancrustacea
- Class: Insecta
- Order: Hymenoptera
- Family: Apidae
- Tribe: Eucerini
- Genus: Peponapis; Robertson, 1902

= Peponapis =

Genus of bees

Peponapis is a genus of bees belonging to the family Apidae. They are squash bees, specialized pollinators of squashes and related plants.

The species of this genus are found in North America.

Species:

- Peponapis apiculata (Cresson, 1879)
- Peponapis atrata (Smith, 1879)
- Peponapis azteca Hurd & Linsley, 1966
- Peponapis citrullina (Cockerell, 1912)
- Peponapis crassidentata (Cockerell, 1951)
- Peponapis fervens (Smith, 1879)
- Peponapis limitaris (Cockerell, 1906)
- Peponapis melonis (Friese, 1925)
- Peponapis michelbacherorum Hurd & Linsley, 1964
- Peponapis pacifica Ayala & Griswold, 2012
- Peponapis parkeri Griswold & Ayala, 2012
- Peponapis pruinosa (Say, 1837)
- Peponapis smithi Hurd & Linsley, 1966
- Peponapis timberlakei Hurd & Linsley, 1964
- Peponapis utahensis (Cockerell, 1905)
