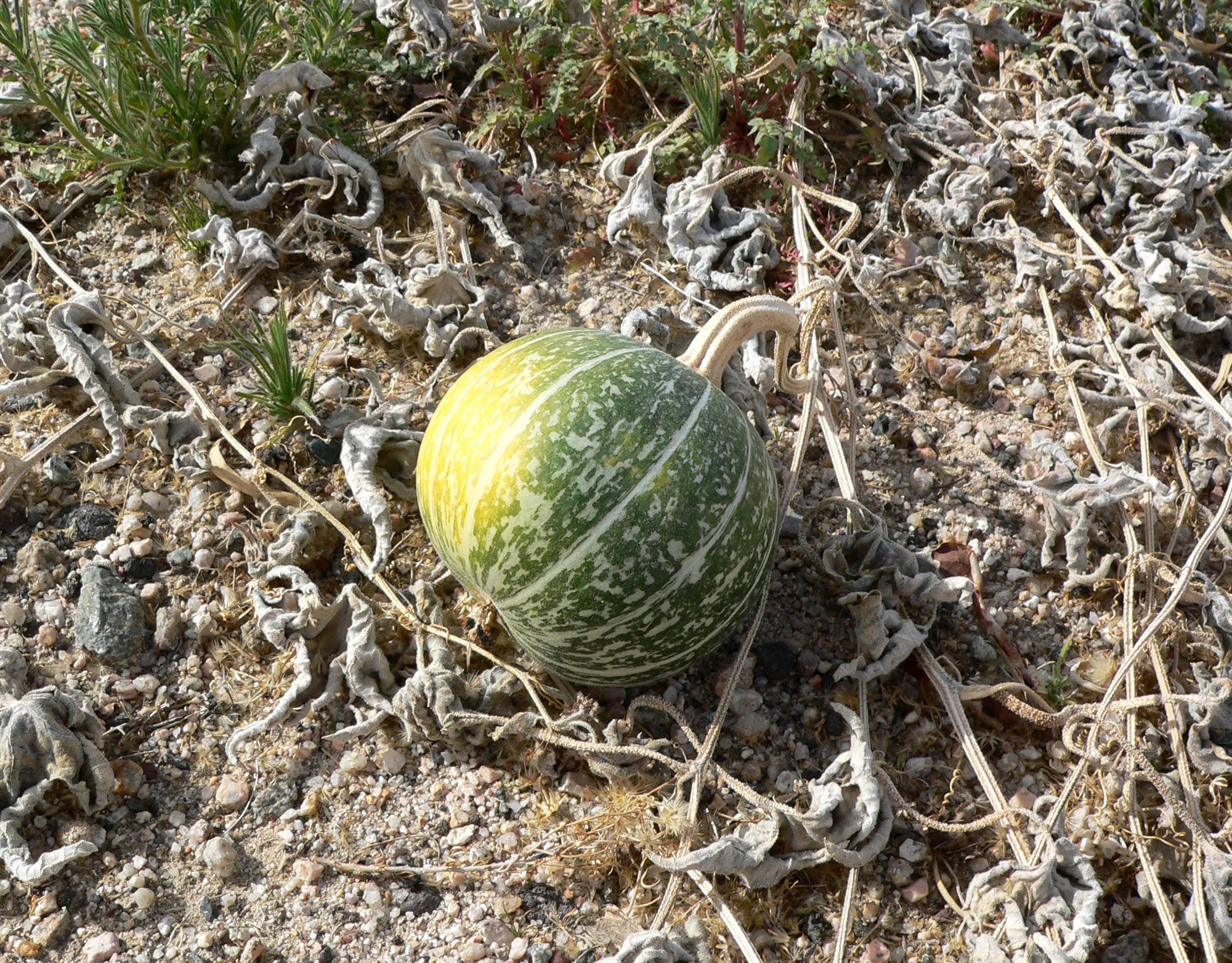

Conservation status
- Data Deficient (IUCN 2.3)

Scientific classification
- Kingdom: Plantae
- Clade: Tracheophytes
- Clade: Angiosperms
- Clade: Eudicots
- Clade: Rosids
- Order: Cucurbitales
- Family: Cucurbitaceae
- Genus: Cucurbita
- Species: C. palmata

Binomial name
- Cucurbita palmata S.Wats.

= Cucurbita palmata =

Species of flowering plant

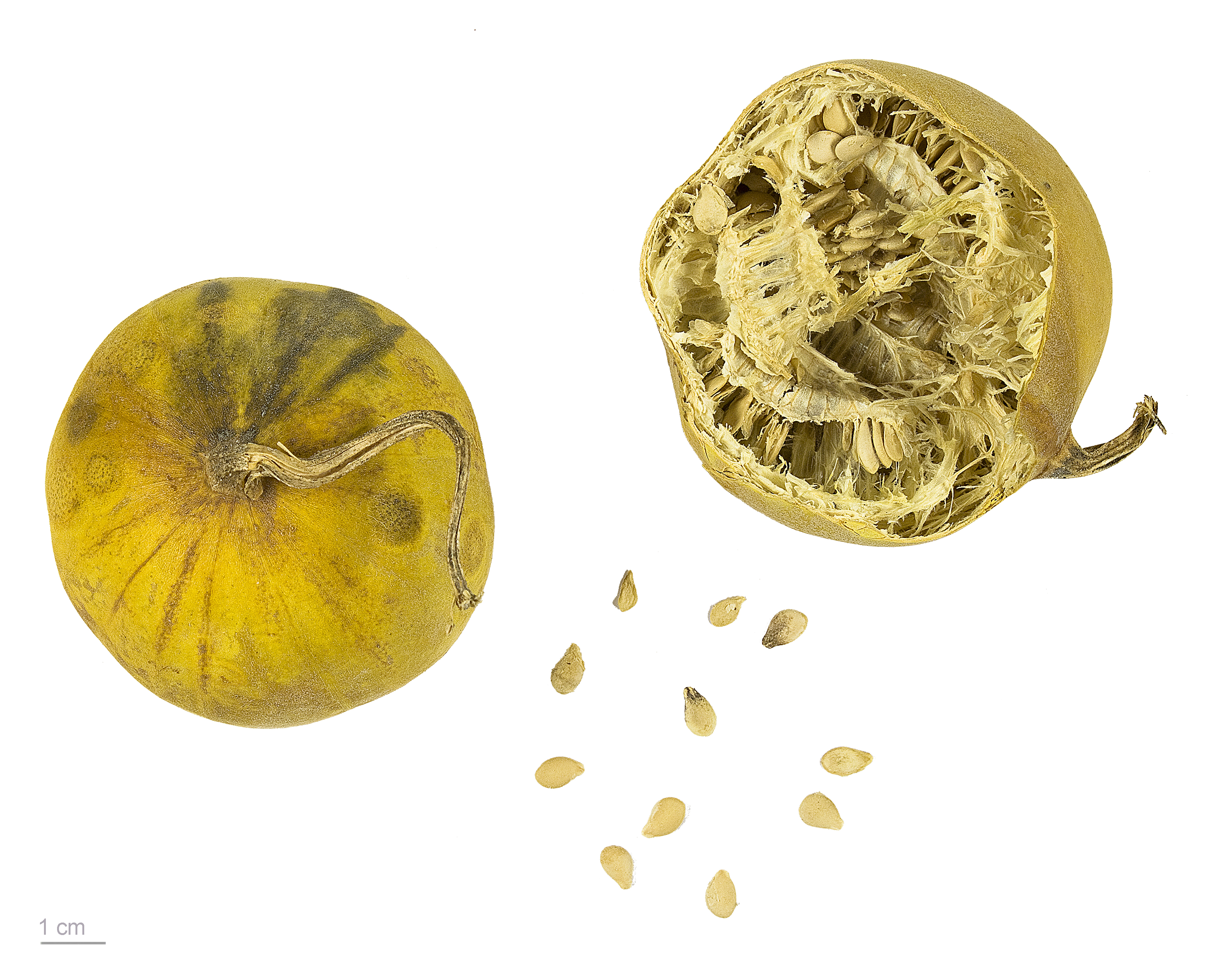
Cucurbita palmata

Cucurbita palmata is a species of flowering plant in the squash family known by the common names coyote melon and coyote gourd. It is similar to Cucurbita californica, Cucurbita cordata, Cucurbita cylindrata, and Cucurbita digitata and all these species hybridize readily. It was first identified by Sereno Watson in 1876. These species form the only restricted xerophyte species group in the genus Cucurbita. Each member of this species group is native to the Southwestern United States and Northwestern Mexico where they are relatively uncommon. Each group member is found in hot, arid regions with low rainfall. They prefer soil that is loose, gravelly, and well-drained. C. palmata is native to northeastern Baja California, southeastern California, and southwestern Arizona to a point near the Colorado River. The juvenile leaves of C. cylindrata, C. cordata, C. digitata, and C. palmata show a high degree of similarity, but their mature leaves are visibly different, as are their root structures. C. palmata and C. digitata are sympatric, with C. palmata separating the ranges of C. digitata at the juncture of Baja California, California, and Arizona. C. palmata fruits are diffuse green mottle that turns yellow at maturity, striped, and round.

== Description ==
Cucurbita palmata is a sprawling vine with rough, stiff-haired stems and leaves. The dark green, light-veined leaves are sharply palmate with usually five long triangular points.

The stiff, curling yellow flowers are 6 to 8 centimeters wide. The plant bears smooth spherical or oblate squash fruits 8 to 10 centimeters wide.

The fruits may be bright yellow to dark green and may have white stripes. The rind is hard and thins with age. With a very bitter flavor the fruits are inedible, though Native Americans used them for soap and also ground the seeds to use as food. Dried gourds were also used as rattles for traditional dance ceremonies.
