= Globoid (botany) =

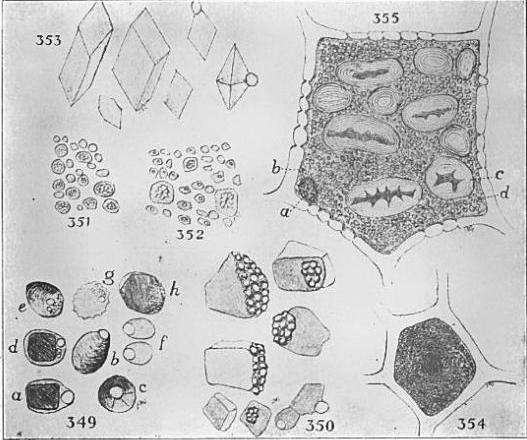
A variety of crystalloids and globoids.

A globoid is a spherical crystalline inclusion in a protein body found in seed tissues that contains phytate and other nutrients for plant growth. These are found in several plants, including wheat and the genus Cucurbita. These nutrients are eventually completely depleted during seedling growth. In Cucurbita maxima, globoids form as early as the 3rd day of seedling growth. They are located in conjunction with a larger crystalloid. They are electron–dense and vary widely in size.
