= List of gourds and squashes =

This list of gourds and squashes provides an alphabetical list of (mostly edible) varieties (cultivars) of the plant genus Cucurbita, commonly called gourds, squashes, pumpkins and zucchinis/courgettes. Common names can differ by location. The varieties included below are members of the following species:

- C. argyrosperma
- C. ficifolia
- C. maxima
- C. moschata
- C. pepo

The entries below are predominantly based on the SysTax database. Not all have the 'accepted' status in the ITIS database.

== C. argyrosperma ==
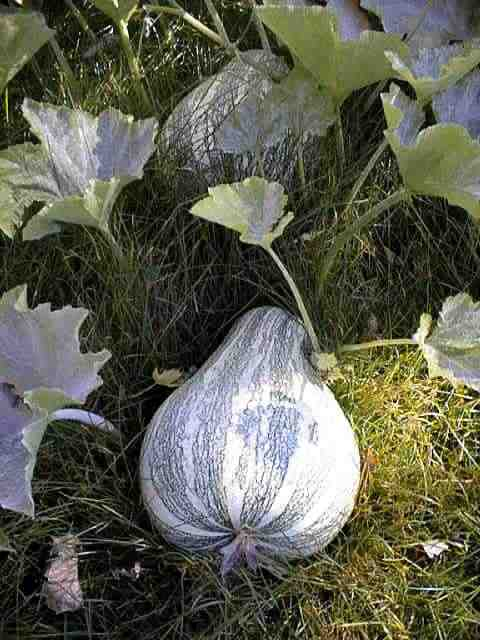
Cushaw squash

- Cushaw squash

== C. ficifolia ==
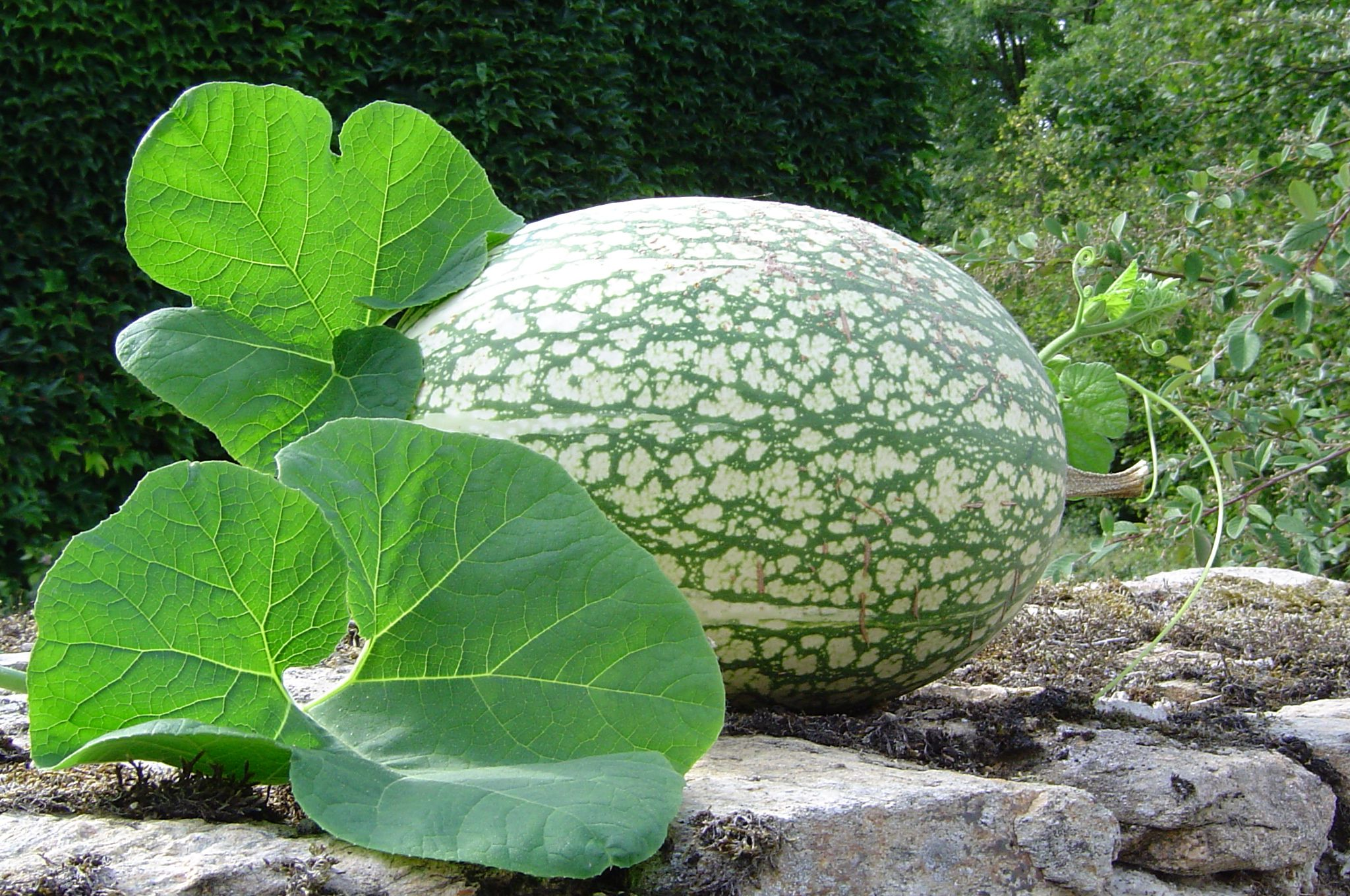
Fig-leaf squash

- Fig-leaf squash

== C. maxima ==
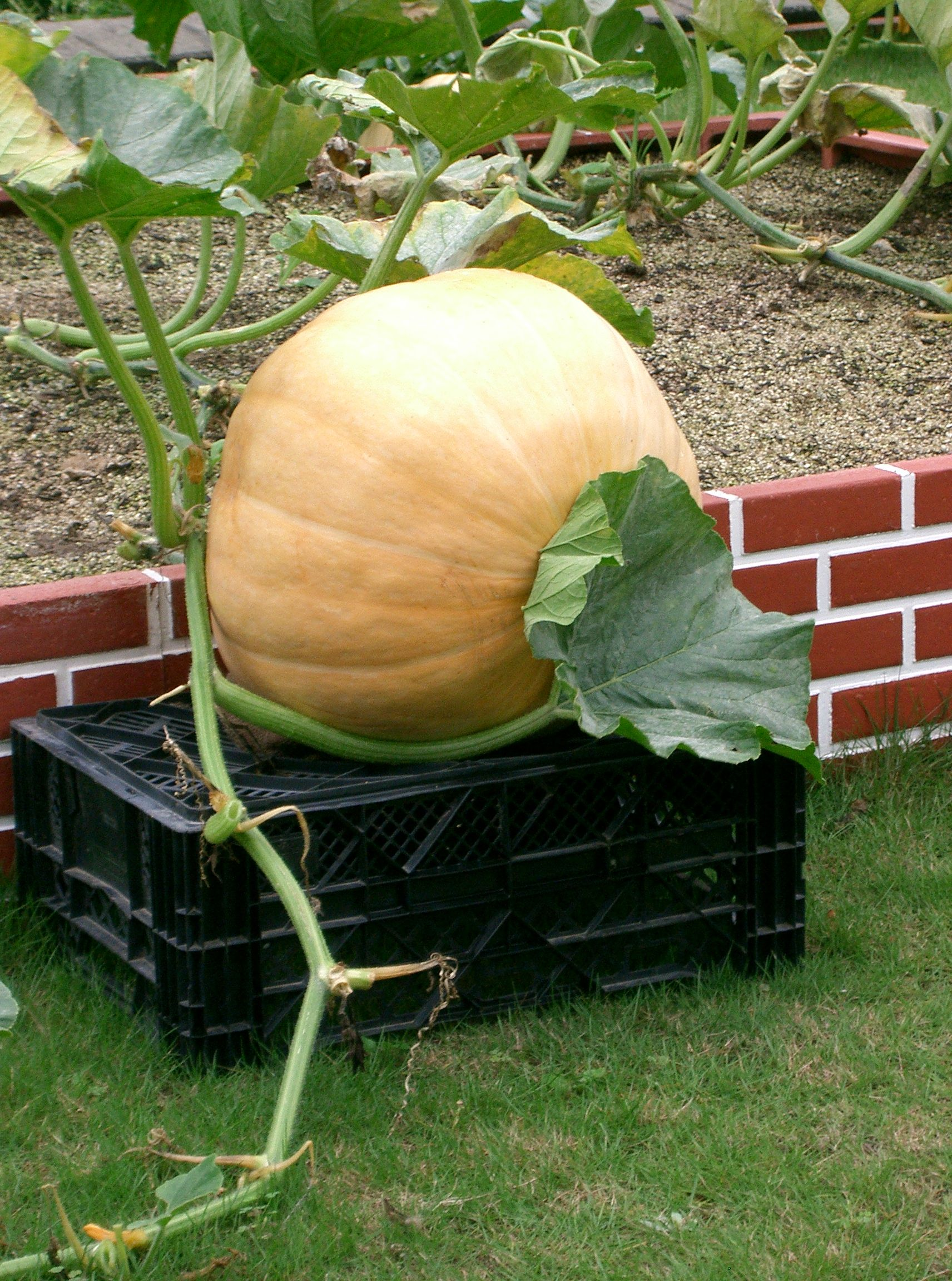
Atlantic Giant

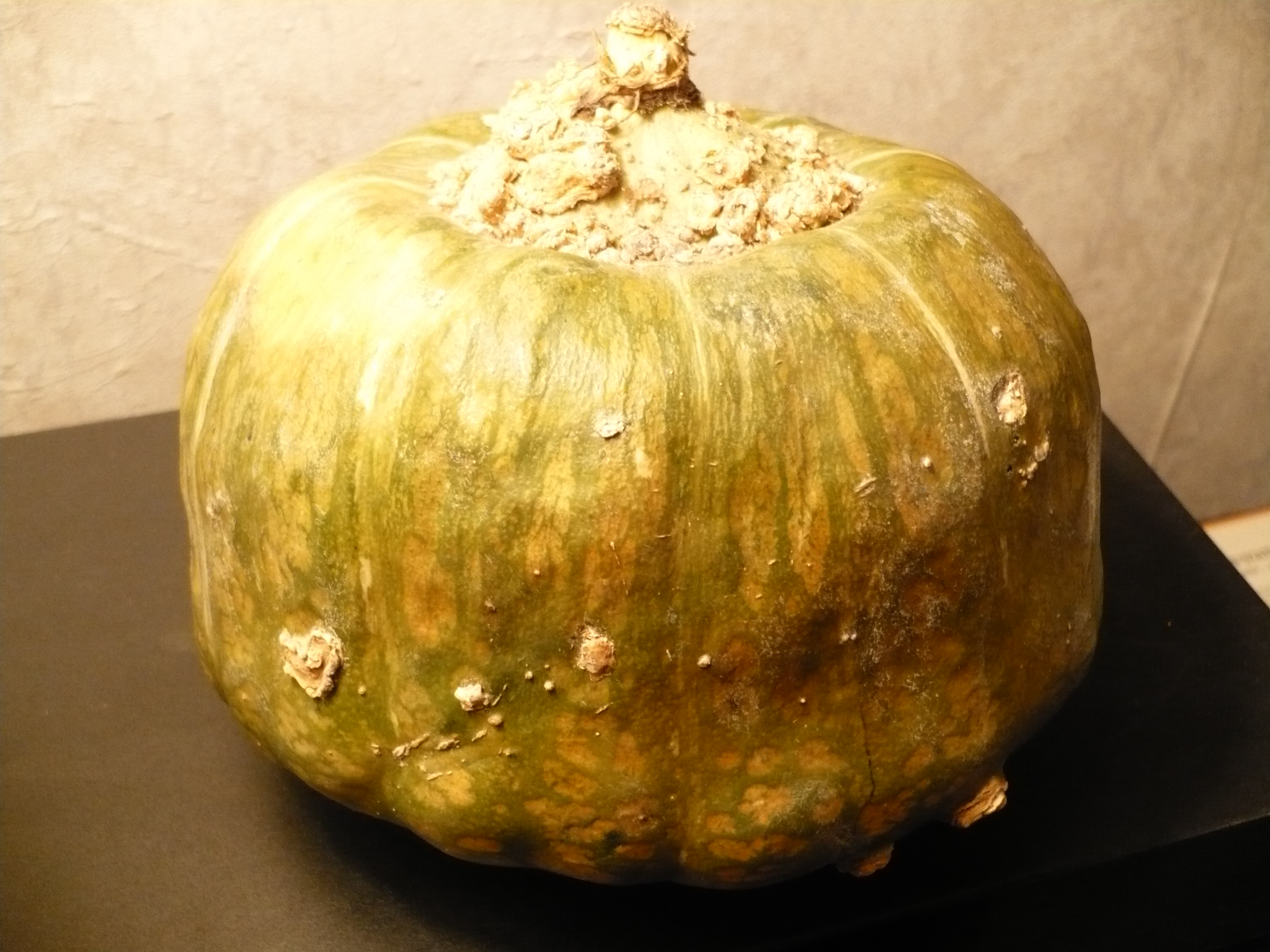
Buttercup squash

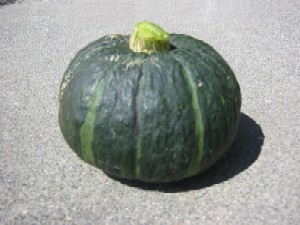
Kabocha

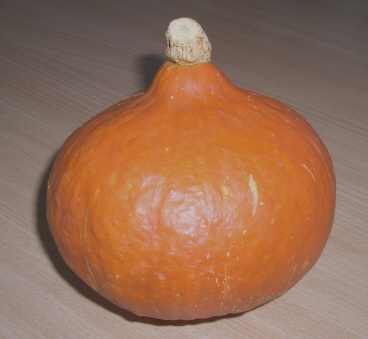
Red kuri

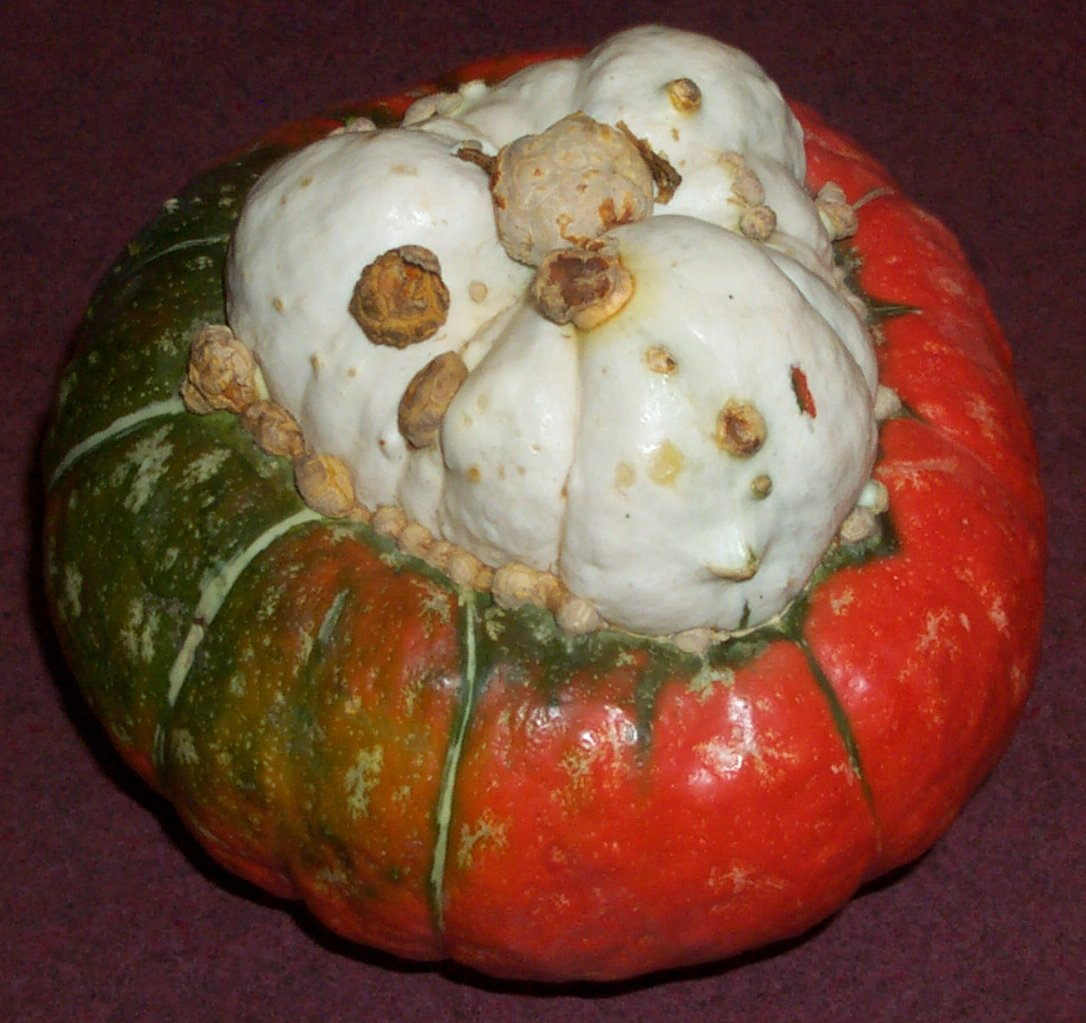
Turban squash

- Amphora
- Aurantiaca-Alba
- Atlantic Giant
- Australian Butter
- Big Moon
- Bleu de Hongrie
- Blue Banana
- Buttercup squash
- Crown Prince
- Flat White Boer A
- Galeux d'Eysines
- Gelber Zentner
- Giraumon Turban
- Golden Delicious
- Golias
- Green Hubbard
- Grosser Gelber Zentner
- Grosser Gruener
- Hubbard squash
- Kiszombori
- Kabocha
- Mammut
- Marina di Chioggia
- Massimo di Chioggia
- Orange Früchte
- Peruaner Kürbis
- Prizewinner
- Queensland Blue
- Red kuri squash (Hokkaido)
- Roter Zentner
- Sweet meat
- Tondo di Nizza
- Triambelkürbis
- Trombone
- Turban squash
- Valenciano
- Veltruska
- Viridi-Alba
- Wildsippe Argentinien
- Yellow Hubbard

== C. moschata ==
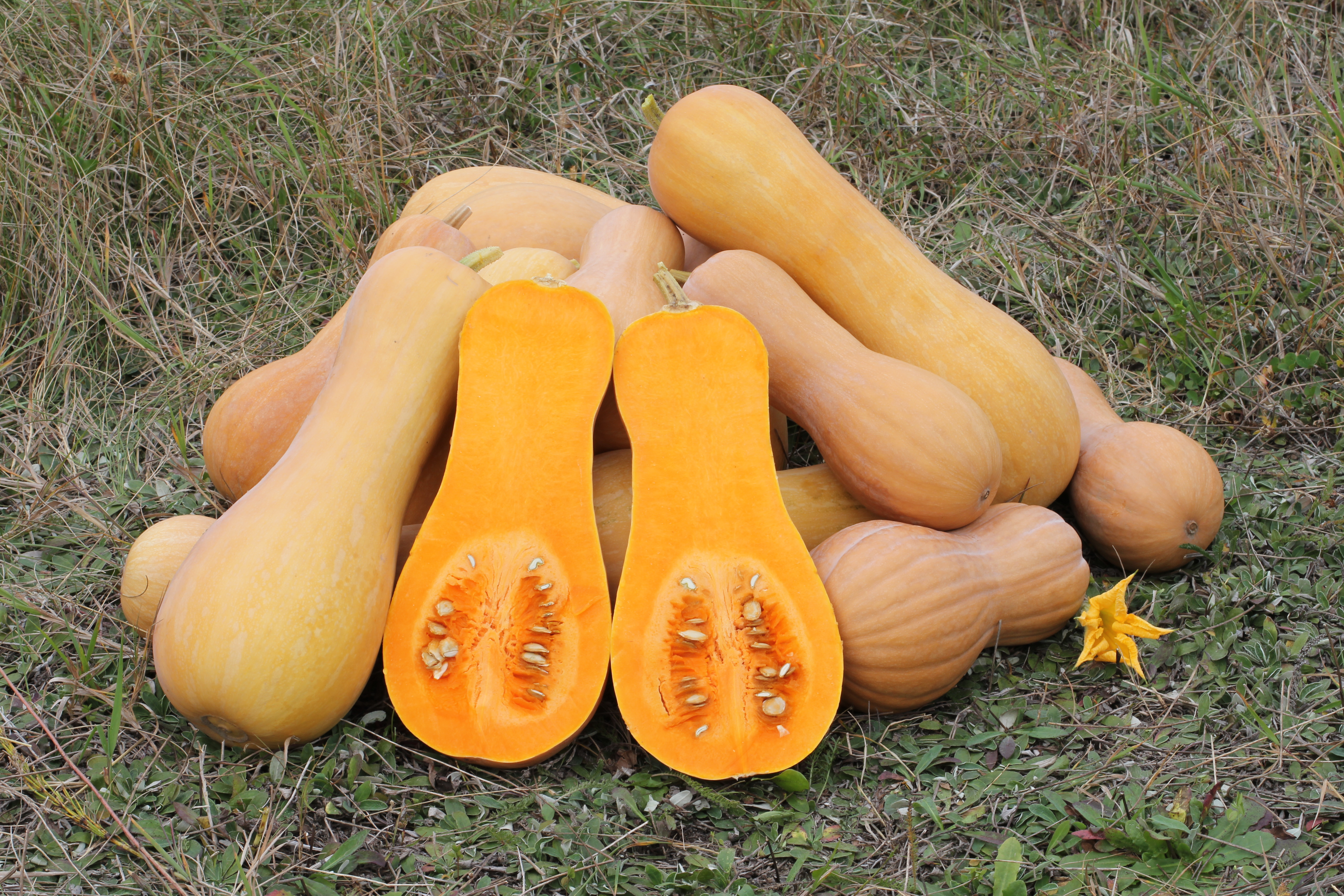
Butternut squash

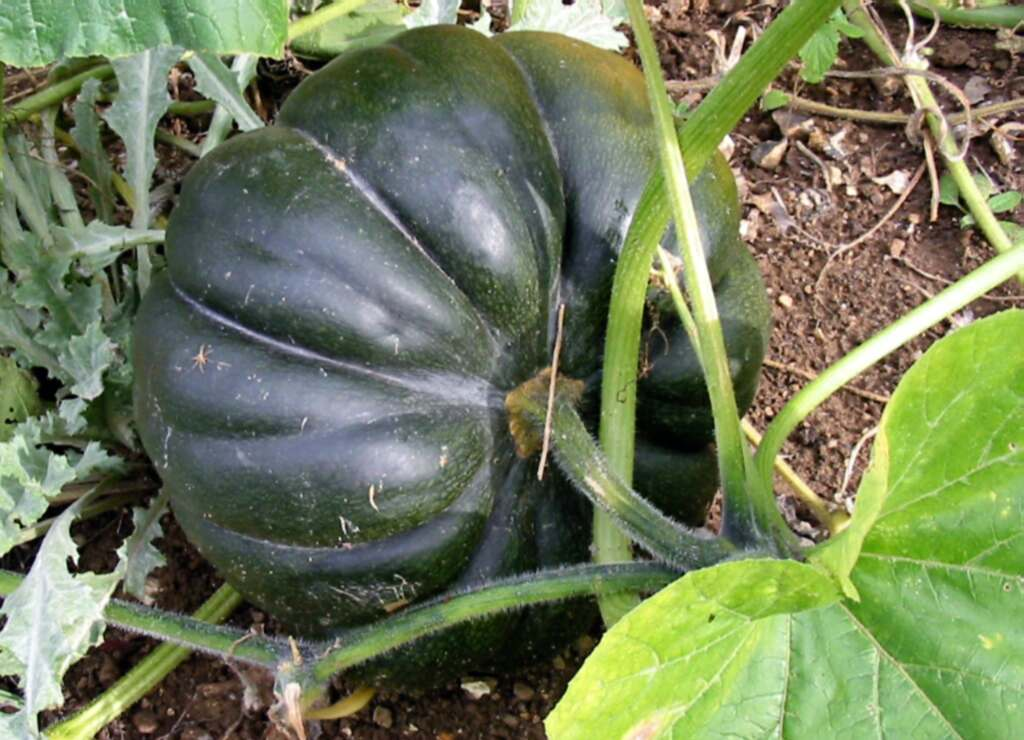
Muscat de Provence

- Butternut squash
- Calabaza
- Dickinson pumpkin
- Futsu black-rinded
- Long Island cheese pumpkin
- Mantelsackkürbis
- Muscat de Provence or Musquee de Provence
- Napolitaner Kürbis
- Shishigatani
- Trombolino d'Albenga
- Zuckerkürbis aus dem Berry

== C. pepo ==
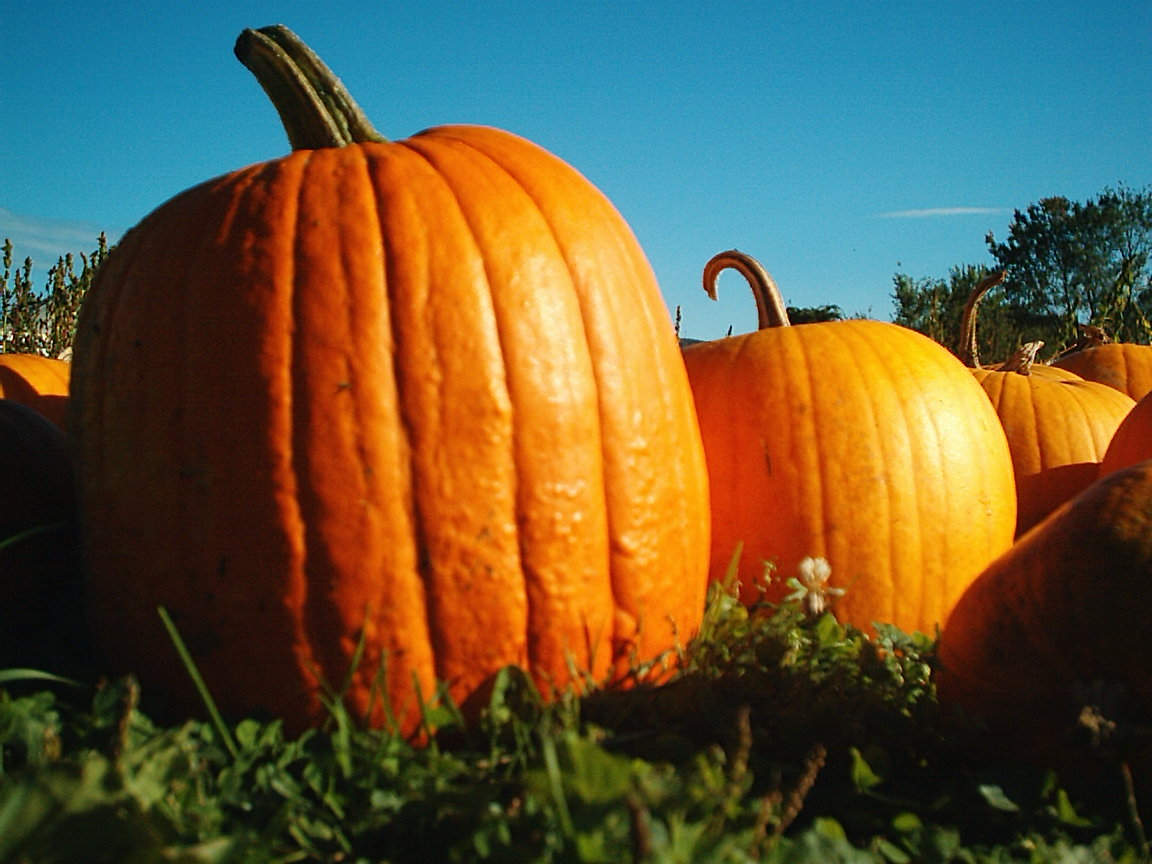
Connecticut field pumpkins

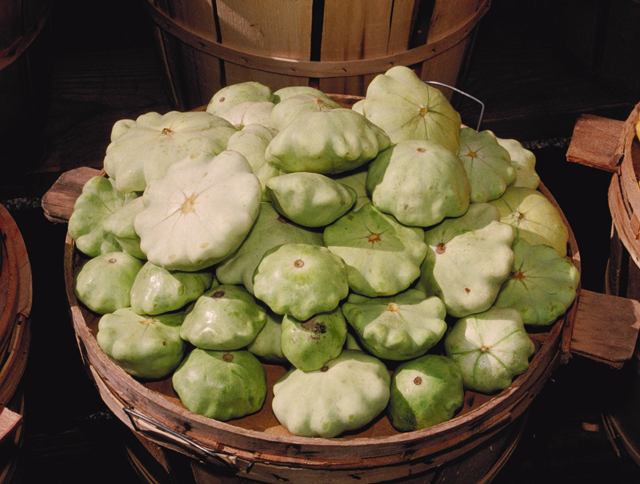
Green button (pattypan) squash

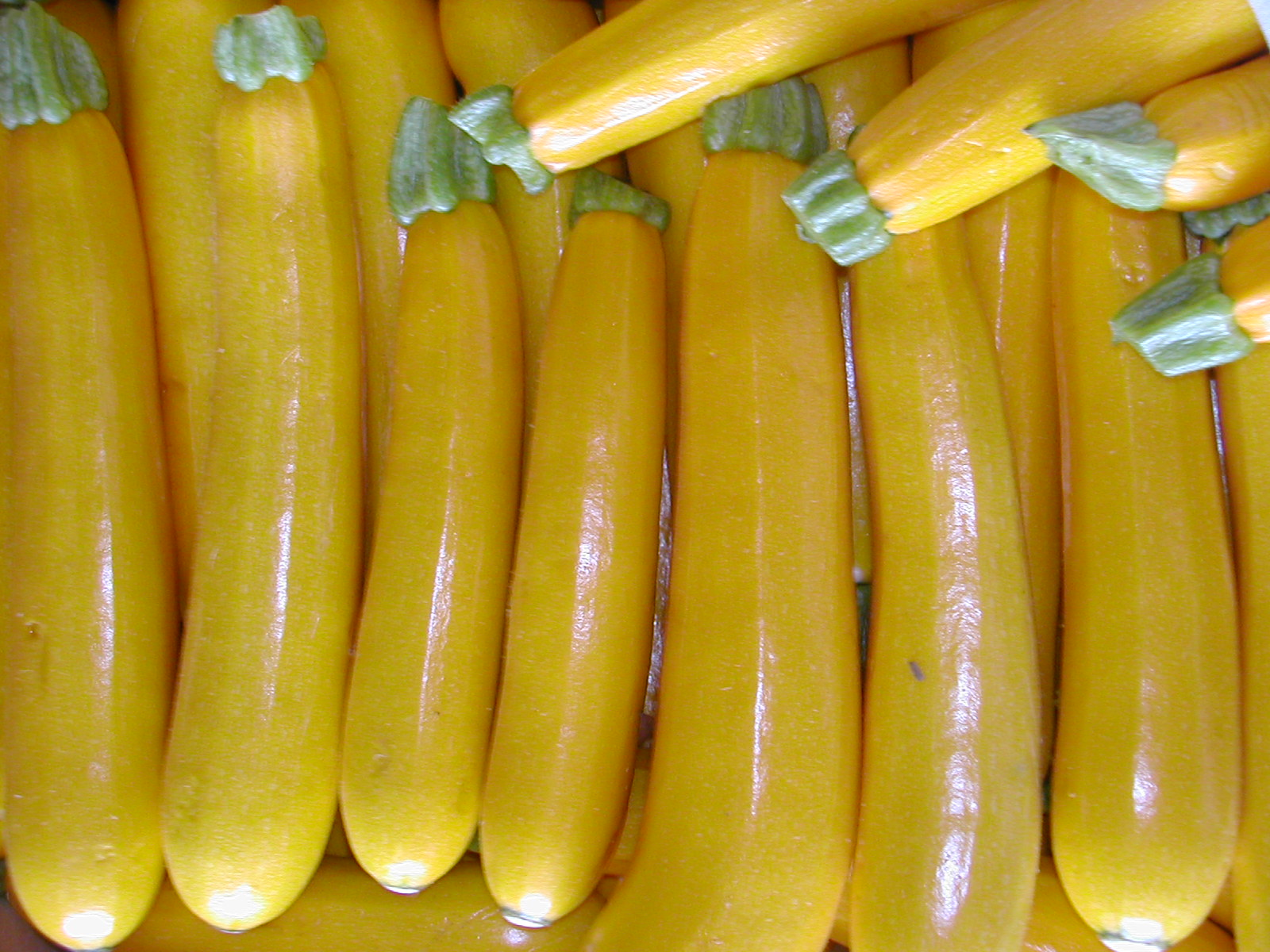
Yellow zucchini

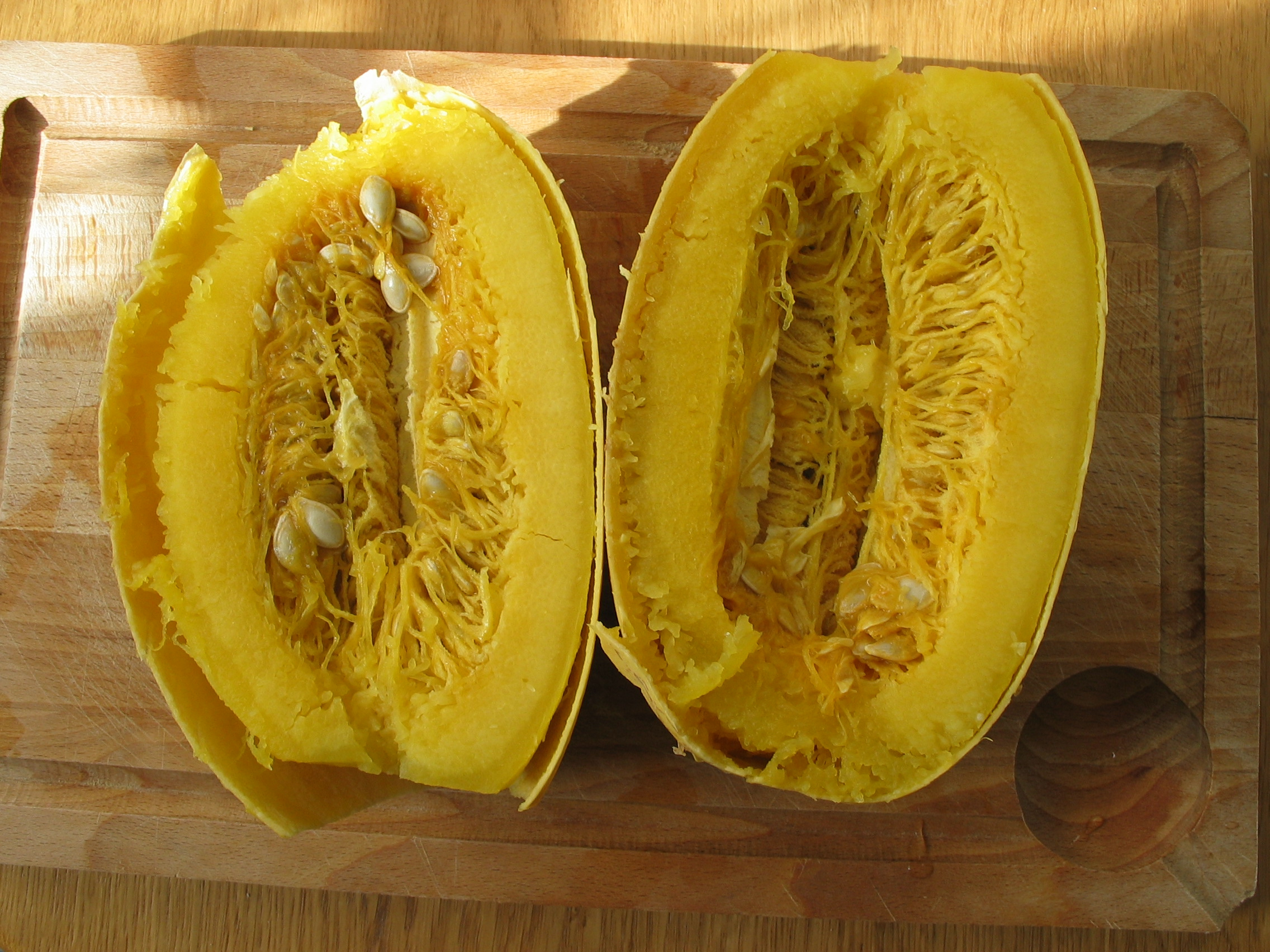
Cooked spaghetti squash

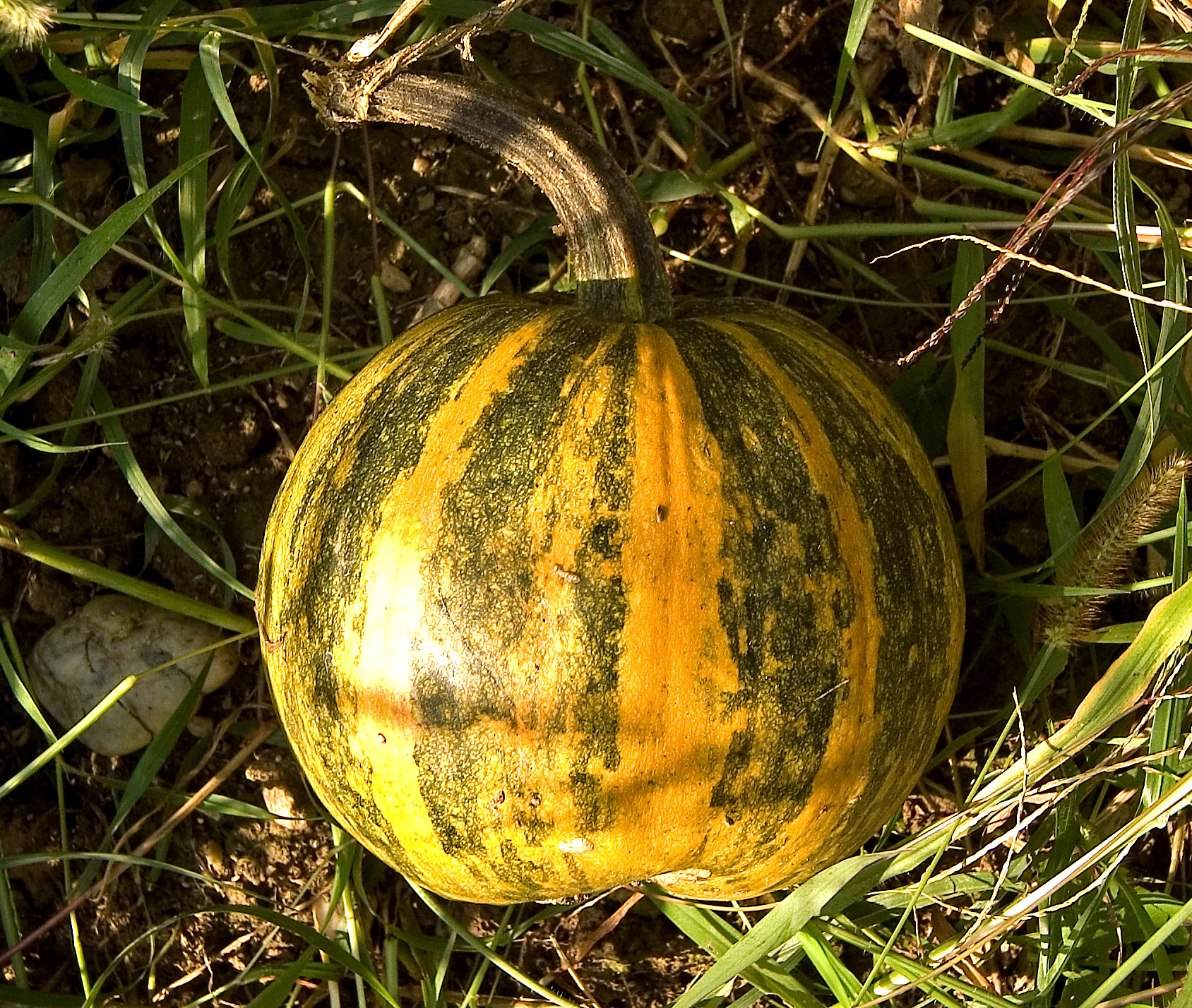
C. pepo var. styriaca

- Acorn squash
- Ampullaris
- Aurantia
- Baby Boo
- Big Max pumpkin
- Black Zucchini
- Blanche de Virginie
- Bunter Patisson
- Caserta
- Casertaosa
- Casertara
- Casertarmis
- Citrullina
- Cocozelle
- Cocozelle von Tripolis
- Connecticut field pumpkin
- Courgette de Nice
- Custard White
- Delicata squash
- Early prolific Straightneck
- Ex Griechenland
- Futterkurbis Oblonga
- Futterkurbis Pyriformis
- Gem squash
- Gemini F1
- Gießener Ölkürbis
- Giromontina
- Gold Rush F1
- Indian Summer Mix
- Jack be Little
- Jaspee de Vandee
- Kleine Warzen
- Kronenkurbis
- Kronenmischung
- Lebanese
- Maliformis
- Mandarin
- Olkurbis Comet
- Olkurbis Reform
- Patidou
- Patisson
- Pattypan squash
- Petite Verte de l'Algerie
- Pyriformis
- Pyxidaris
- Rankenloser Ölkürbis
- Reticulata
- Romanesco
- Roter Zentner
- Runder Nizzakürbis
- Spaghetti squash
- Styrian oil pumpkin
- Tatuma (Tatume) (White Mexican squash)
- Tschermak
- Verrucosa
- Verrucosissima
- Verte d´Italia
- Wendehals
- White Custard
- Winterhorn
- Yellow summer squash
- Zucchini

== See also ==
- List of squash and pumpkin dishes
