= Gourd (disambiguation) =

Gourd is a plant of the family Cucurbitaceae, and/or its fruit.

Gourd may also refer to:

- The Gourds, a musical group
- List of gourds and squashes, species in the genus Cucurbita
- Gourd Lake, a lake in Minnesota
- Loaded dice
- Penis gourd, a type of penis sheath.

== See also ==
- Gourde (disambiguation)
