= 1068 Wallace =

Individual pumpkin

1068 Wallace (845 Bobier x 898 Knauss) was an Atlantic Giant pumpkin grown by Ron Wallace in Rhode Island, United States during 2003. The fruit's progeny includes dozens of other pumpkins over 1,000 pounds, including the 1502 Wallace in 2006, at the time the heaviest pumpkin in the world. Its seeds have been described as the most sought-after of their kind, and have sold for $850 apiece at auction.
