= Big Max =

Large pumpkin species

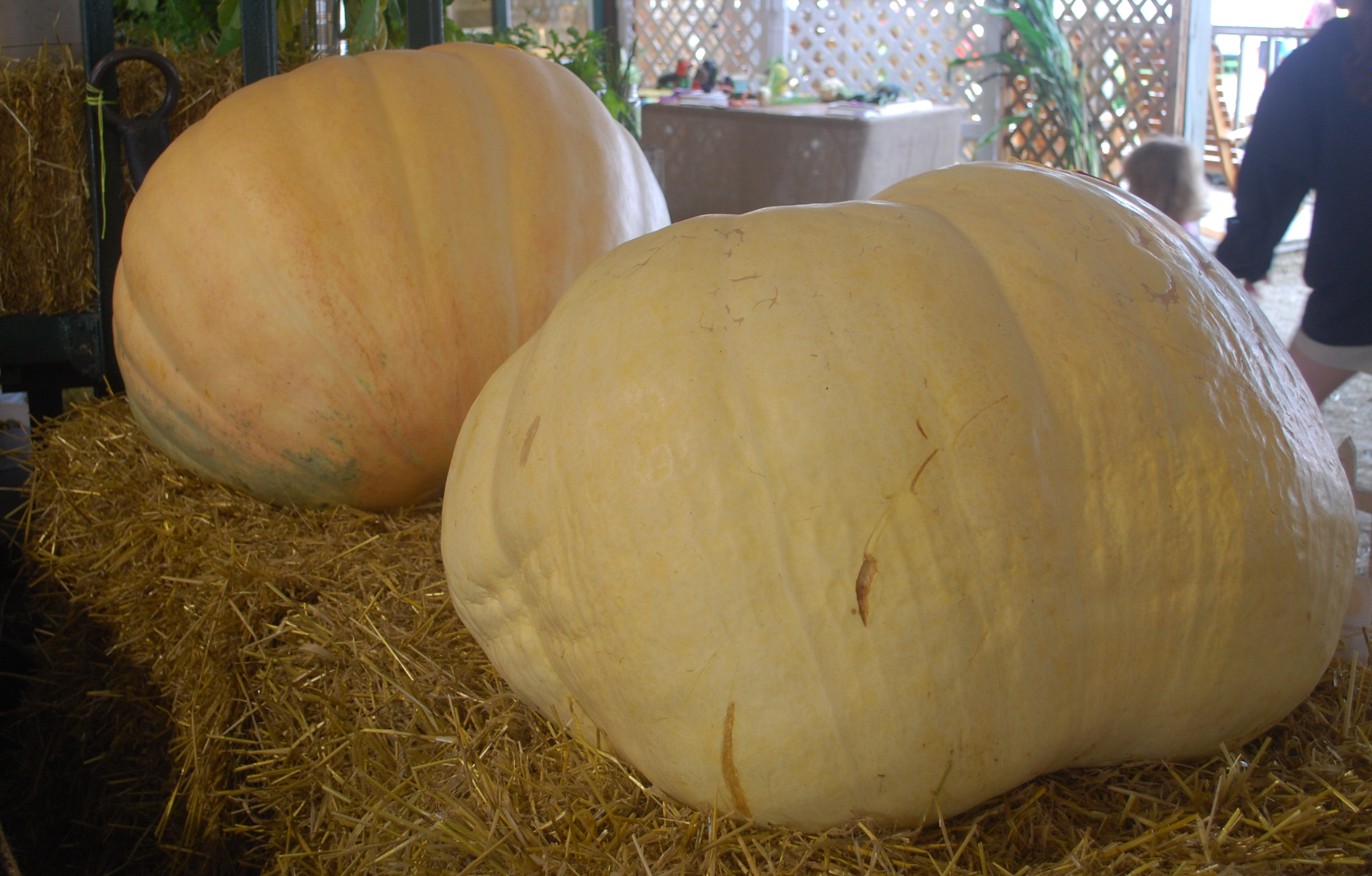
Big Max pumpkins at a county fair in New York

Big Max is a large type of pumpkin of the species Cucurbita maxima that can exceed 150 pounds (68 kg) under ideal growing conditions. They are often bright orange in color, with fine-grained, yellow-orange flesh. The skin, deeply ribbed and slightly roughened, can grow to be 3 to 4 in (76 to 102 mm) thick, making them favorable for storage. The flesh has been described as good for canning and freezing. However, their size often makes utilizing them for culinary uses cumbersome, and they lack the flavor and texture present in smaller pumpkin varieties.

The variety was hybridized for its size during the early 1960s. Specimens as large as 300 pounds have been grown. Individual fruits are round to slightly flattened.

Best planted between two and four weeks after the average last frost, Big Max pumpkins typically become ripe 110 to 120 days after sowing. The cultivar requires large amounts of room to grow properly, and to achieve the maximum size, it is recommended to limit each vine to one fruit. They are harvested before the first light frost, when the plant's foliage dies. Seedlings sometimes emerge in five to ten days, though germination may take up to 14 days. Although recommendations vary, seeds are often planted at a depth of 1 to 3 cm (0.39 to 1.18 in), spaced 3 to 8 cm (1.2 to 3.1 in) apart, in hills of between five and eight seeds. Hills are spaced 5 to 8 ft (1.5 to 2.4 m) apart, and thinned to two to three plants.

== See also ==
- List of gourds and squashes
