= Red kuri squash =

Type of winter squash

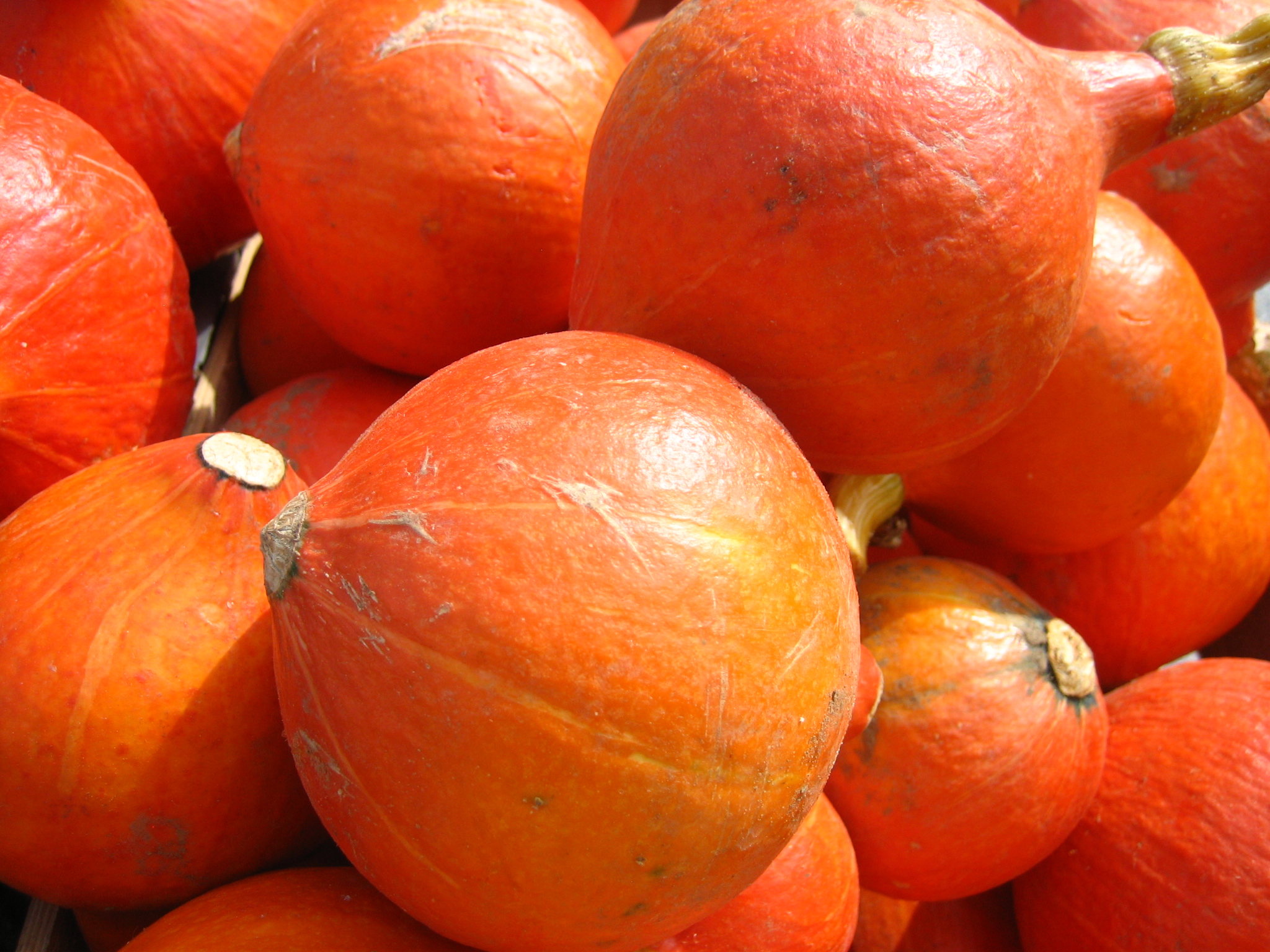
Red kuri squash

Red kuri squash (katakana: ウチキクリ) is a thin-skinned orange-colored winter squash, a cultivated variety of the species Cucurbita maxima. It looks like a small pumpkin without the ridges. It belongs to the Hubbard squash group.

Inside the hard outer skin there is a firm flesh that provides a very delicate and mellow chestnut-like flavor. Other varieties of this subspecies include 'Hokkaido', 'Red Hokkaido' and 'Sweet Meat' squashes.

== History ==
It is generally understood that all squash originated in Mesoamerica, but may have been independently cultivated in eastern North America, albeit later.

Red kuri squash is commonly called "Japanese squash", "orange Hokkaido squash", "baby red hubbard squash", or "Uchiki kuri squash". In Japan, the word kuri may refer to either the squash discussed in this article or to Japanese chestnuts. In France, it is called potimarron, and in the United Kingdom, it is commonly called "onion squash".

Primarily grown in Japan, California, Florida, Southwestern Colorado, Mexico, Tasmania, Tonga, New Zealand, Chile, Provence, and South Africa, red kuri is widely adapted for climates that provide a growing season of 100 days or more. Most of the California, Colorado, Tonga and New Zealand crops are exported to Japan.

== Characteristics ==
This hardy squash grows to maturity in full sun and is drought tolerant. Each vine produces multiple teardrop-shaped fruits, usually three. The squash matures about ninety days after blooming.

The squash is a hard-shelled winter variety with firm yellow flesh. The flesh often has a green tint under the seeds.

== Culinary uses ==
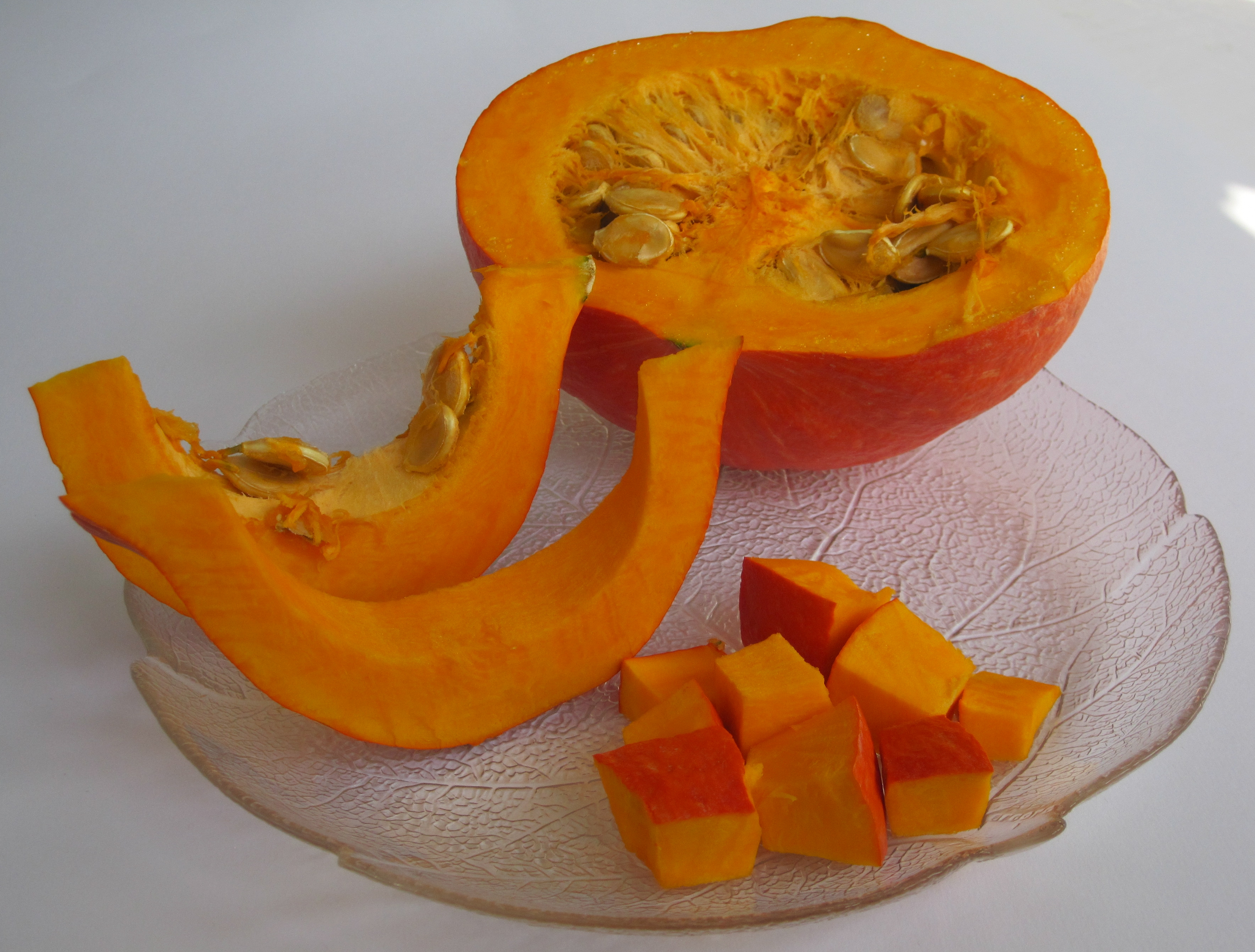
Red kuri prepared for cooking.

Full-flavored and sweet, red kuri squash is often cooked with butter and herbs. It is an ingredient in a variety of soups, stews and casseroles. It can be made into cakes, quick breads, muffins, cookies, jams and pies with its nutty-tasting flesh. It can be baked, boiled, microwaved, steamed, sautéed or fried. This squash adds sweet flavor and texture to stir-fries. Its seed cavity is ideal for stuffing.

When cooked, the hard outer skin softens completely, making peeling unnecessary, especially if buying organic. The most intense orange colour is located in the skin, hinting at its concentrated beta-carotene content.

== Nutrition ==
Red kuri squash is a good source of fiber. It also provides vitamin A and vitamin C, some of the B vitamins, calcium, potassium, iron, riboflavin and thiamine. Low in calories and sodium, this deep-colored squash also contains beta-carotene.

Nutrition facts (1 cup cooked, cubes):

334.5 kilojoules (79.95 Cal)
Protein: 1.82 grams
Carbohydrate: 17.94 grams
Dietary Fiber: 5.74 grams
Calcium: 28.7 mg
Iron: 0.67 mg
Potassium: 895.85 mg
Folate: 57.40 mcg
Vitamin: A 7,291.85
