= Howard Dill =

Canadian giant pumpkin breeder

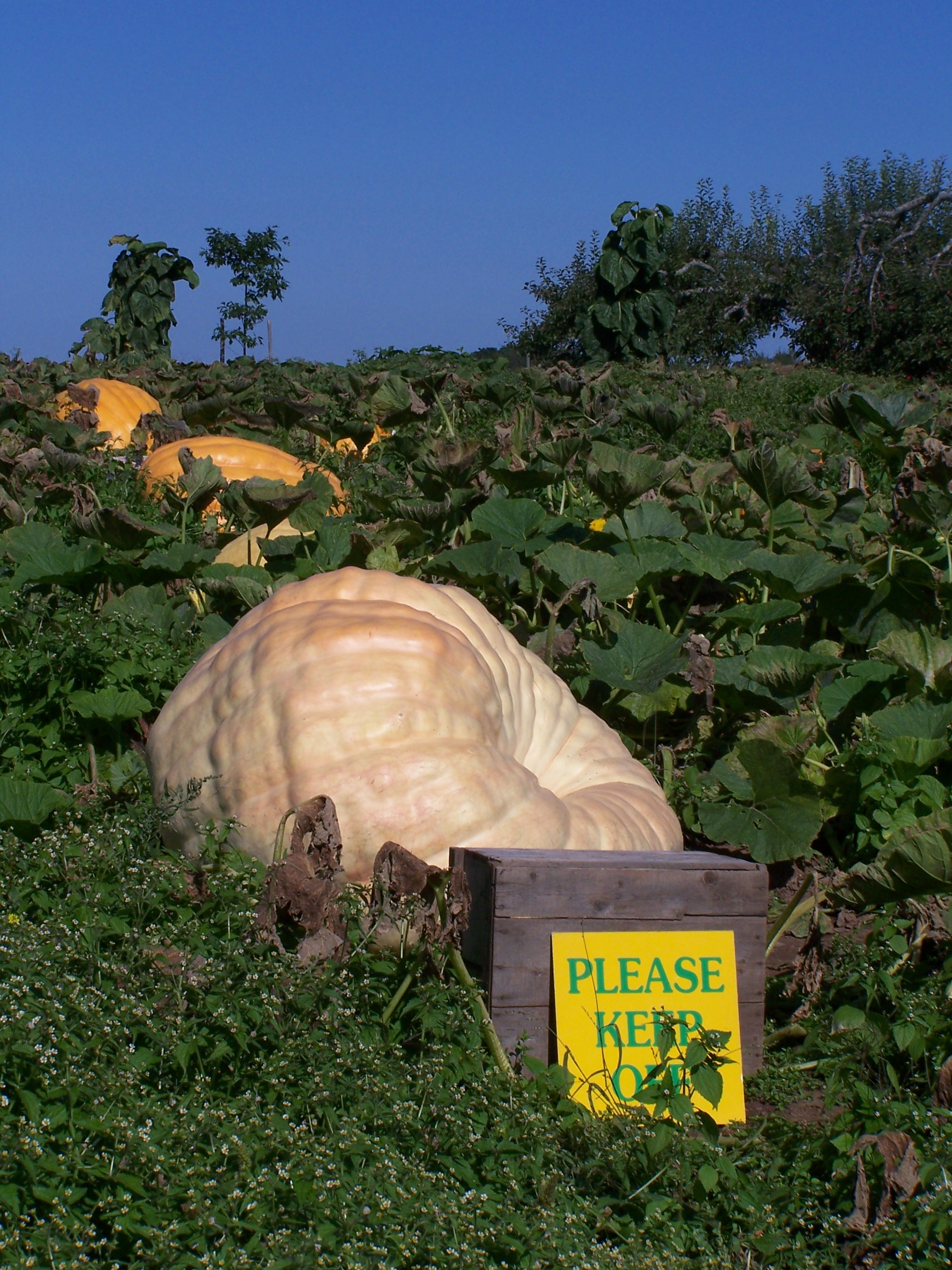
Dill's Pumpkin Patch in 2004

Howard William Dill (July 11, 1934 – May 20, 2008) was a Canadian giant pumpkin breeder who patented a pumpkin seed variety called Atlantic Giant. Dill was known as "The Pumpkin King" and "The father of all pumpkins".

Dill grew pumpkin varieties for many years in the Annapolis Valley close to Windsor, Nova Scotia. He left school in grade 6 and taught himself plant genetics. Dill earned business from competitive giant pumpkin growers and ordinary gardeners from Thailand and Turkey.

At the International Pumpkin Association weigh-off in 1979, one of his early hybrids earned him the top prize for 199 kg (439 lb). He was given the title of "Pumpkin King" at this time. Atlantic Giant pumpkin seeds were first patented in 1979 by Dill, who then went on to set the world record, this event took place in 1980 with a 459 lb (208 kg) record.

Dill died in 2008 of liver cancer.
