= Jack-be-little =

Pumpkin variety

Cucurbita pepo 'Jack be Little'
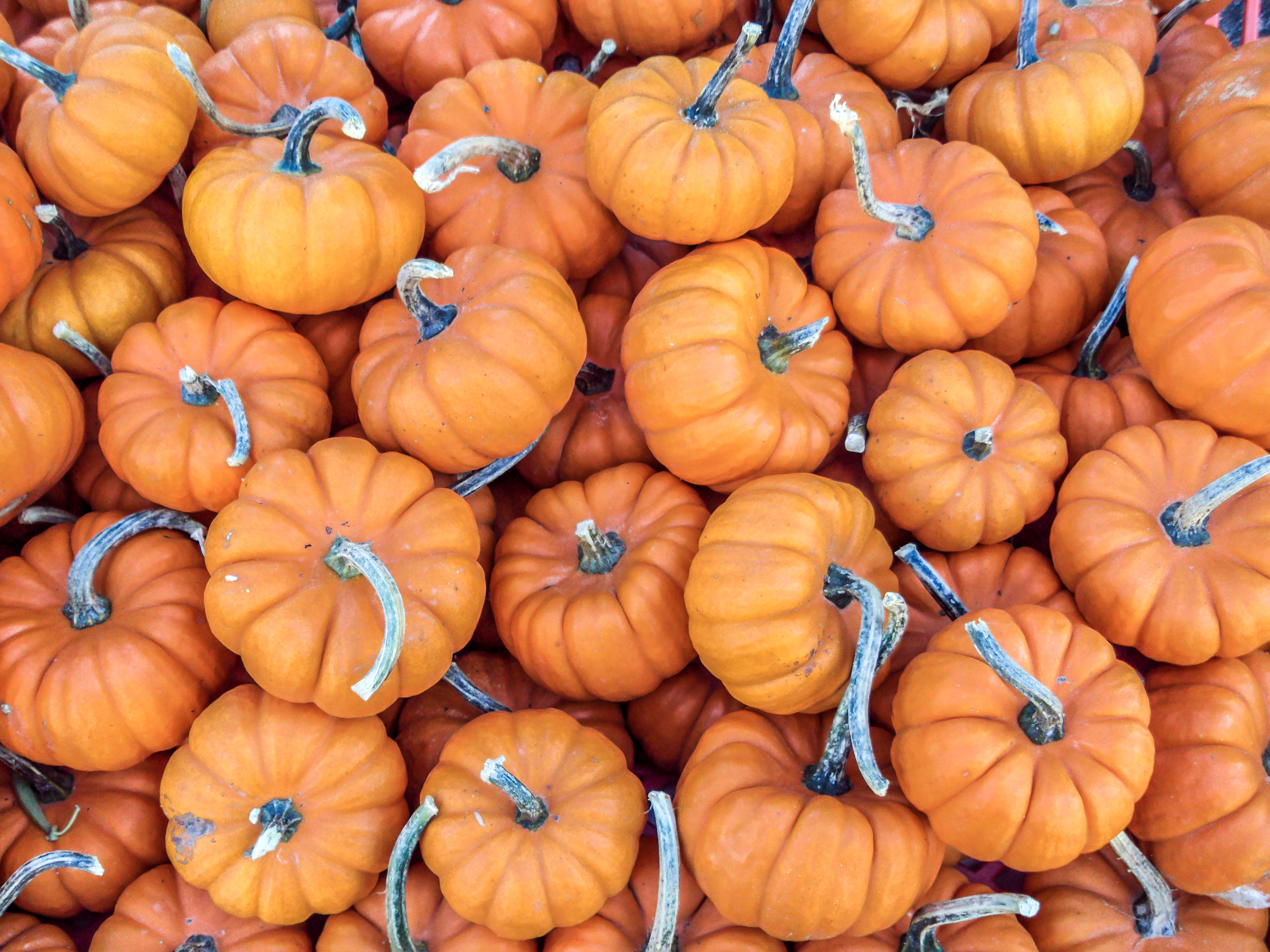
- Species: Cucurbita pepo
- Cultivar: 'Jack be Little'
- Origin: Indiana, US

Jack-be-little is a variety of Cucurbita pepo. Introduced in the 1980s, the small palm-sized pumpkins are a popular decorative object and can be used in cooking.

== History ==
The variety originates from an Indiana farmer who, in 1977, came to seed producers Bob Nelson and Larry Hollar of Hollar and Co. seed growers in Rocky Ford, Colorado, with a basket full of the pumpkins. The pumpkin initially did not breed true, with the farmer explaining that they would sell well in years they did, but this was inconsistent. Over six years, a breeding program was able to make the variety constantly small and uniform in color.

Once the seeds became publicly available in the late 1980s, the pumpkin quickly became popular among both backyard gardeners and commercial growers.

== Characteristics ==
Jack-be-littles typically have a bright orange, sometimes white, skin and are round, ribbed, and flattened, and are approximately palm sized. They are typically 1 inch (25 mm) tall and 2 to 3 inches (51 to 76 mm) wide. The pumpkins take approximately 95 days to mature.

When first made widely available to buyers, the pumpkins became used mostly as decoration. They can be dried or shellacked to be used to decorate inside the home. If left outside, the pumpkins will quickly decompose.

The Jack-be-little has established itself as an eating pumpkin due to its size and sweet mild-tasting flesh. The hollowed-out pumpkins can be used as serving bowls for soup, stuffed and baked with meat or vegetarian fillings, or filled with a dessert custard. Care must be taken to make sure the pumpkins used in cooking were not treated with potentially harmful chemicals.
