= Turban squash =

Heirloom squash

Cucurbita maxima 'Turban'
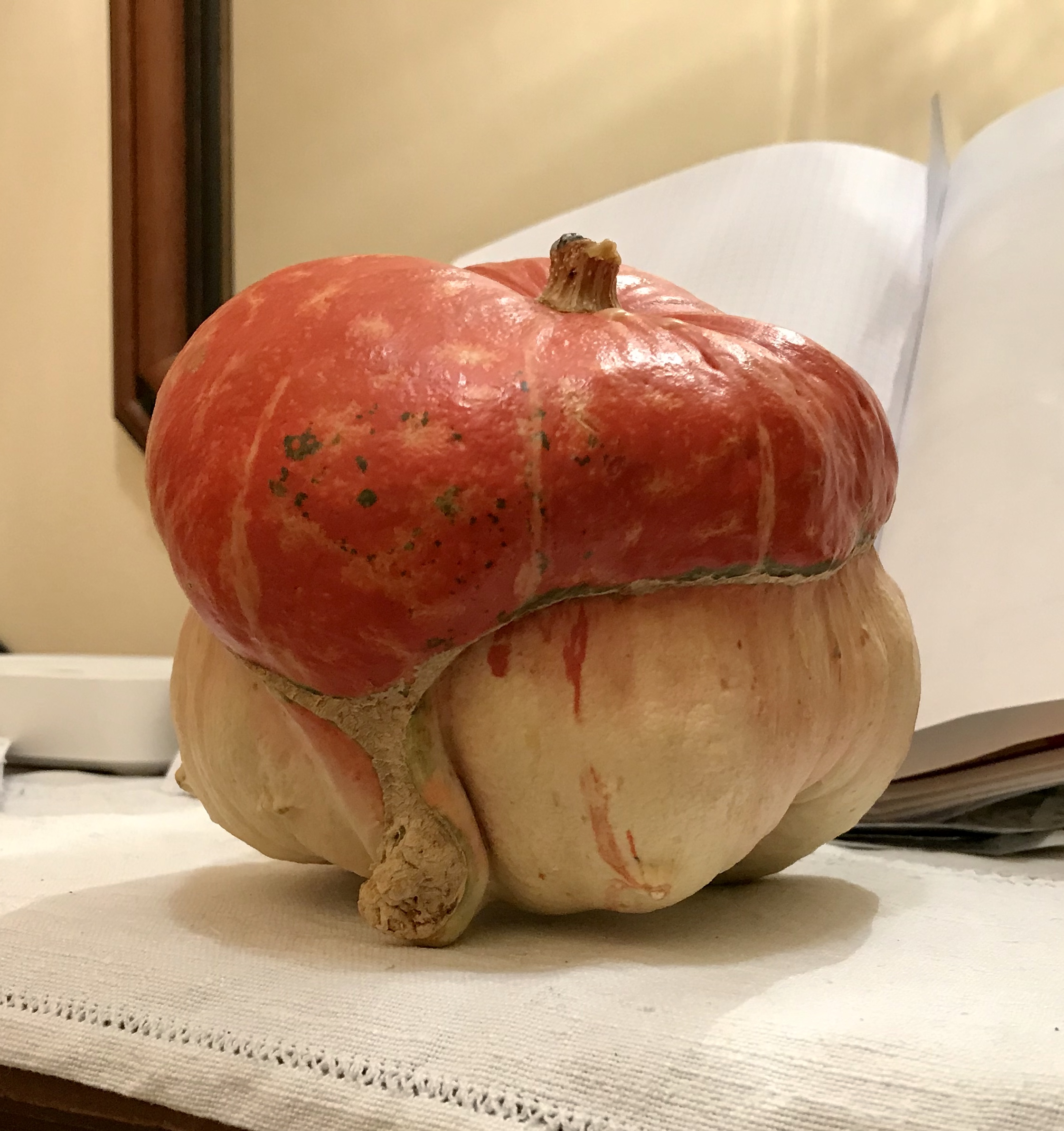
- Turban squash (variety Mini red turban)
- Species: Cucurbita maxima
- Cultivar: Turban, Mini red turban
- Origin: Northeastern United States

Turban squash, also known as "Turk's turban" or "French turban" ("Giraumon" in French), is a type of squash most often used as a winter squash. It is an heirloom, predating 1820. A cultivar of Cucurbita maxima, it is closely related to the buttercup squash. It is typically 6 pounds when mature. Colors vary, but are often mottled in shades of orange, red, white and green. The squash is used as both a vegetable and as an ornamental gourd. Taste is similar to other C. maxima cultivars, though "not as vibrant," "reminiscent to hazelnut," and "coarse, watery and insipid." Known in the nineteenth century as "the most beautiful in color, and the most worthless in quality, of all the varieties of squash;" More recently, Ian Knauer, author of "The Farm", has described it as "nutty and sweet".

There are two varieties or cultivars:

- Turk's turban: a medium-sized tricolor gourd with red cap and red, green and white turban.
- Mini red turban: a small-sized bicolor gourd with red cap and white turban (sometimes with narrow red stripes).
