= Jarrahdale pumpkin =

Varietal of Cucurbita maxima

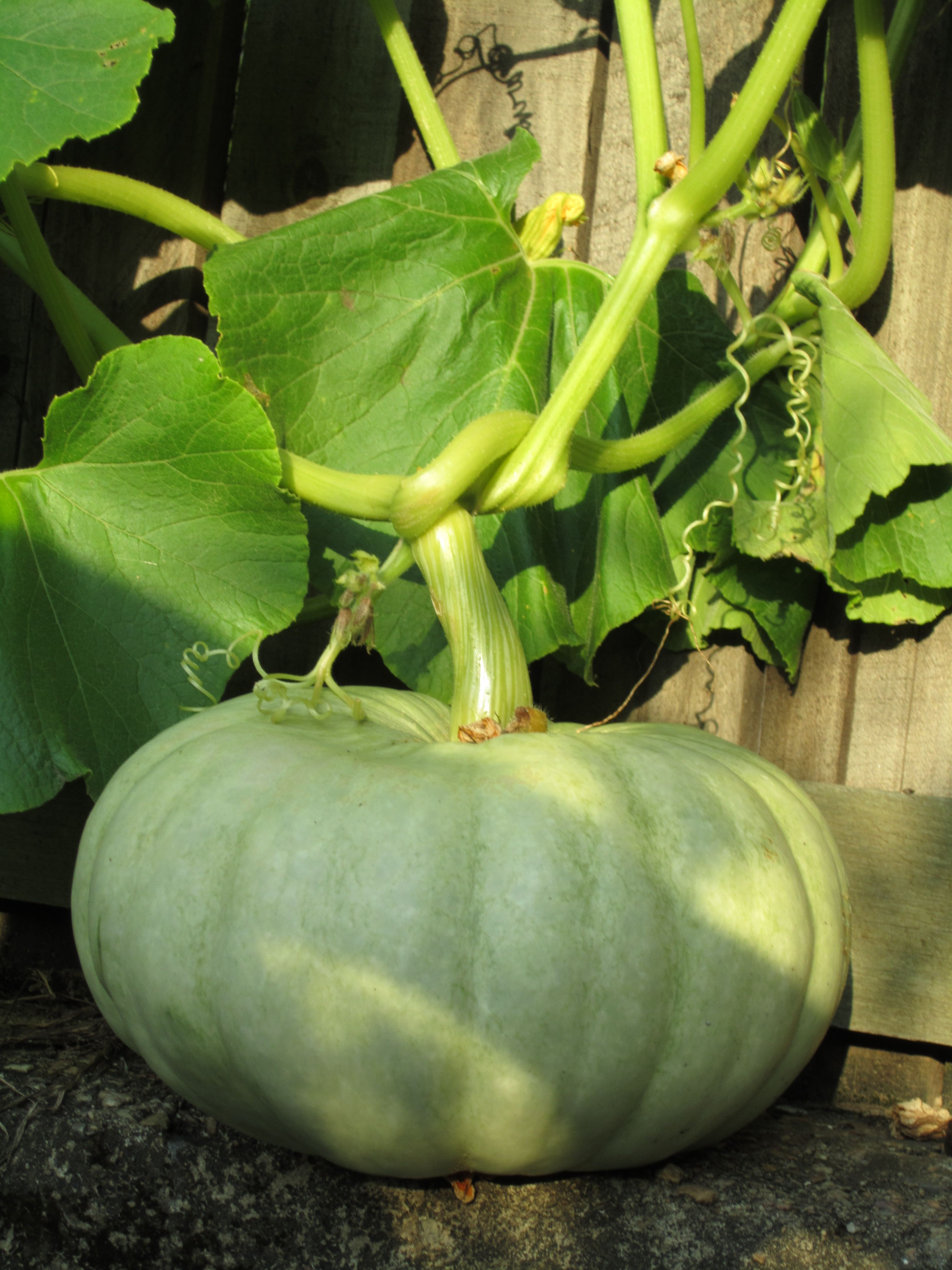
Jarrahdale Pumpkin

The Jarrahdale pumpkin is an heirloom variety of winter pumpkin bred in Australia with a blue-gray skin, named after the Western Australian town of Jarrahdale. The Jarrahdale closely resembles the Queensland blue. It cuts easily, and has orange, sweet-tasting flesh.
