= Gourd Lake =

Lake of Otter Tail County, Minnesota, United States of America

- Location within Minnesota
- Location: Otter Tail County, Minnesota
- Coordinates: 46°22′57″N 95°33′9″W
- Type: lake

Gourd Lake is a lake in Otter Tail County, in the U.S. state of Minnesota.

Gourd Lake was so named on account of its round outline resembling a gourd.

== See also ==
- List of lakes in Minnesota
