= Gourde (disambiguation) =

The Haitian gourde is the currency of Haiti.

Gourde may also refer to:

- Gaston Gourde, a politician with the Liberal Party of Canada
- Jacques Gourde, a politician of the Conservative Party of Canada
- Yanni Gourde, a Canadian ice hockey player

== See also ==
- Gourd, a plant of the family Cucurbitaceae.
