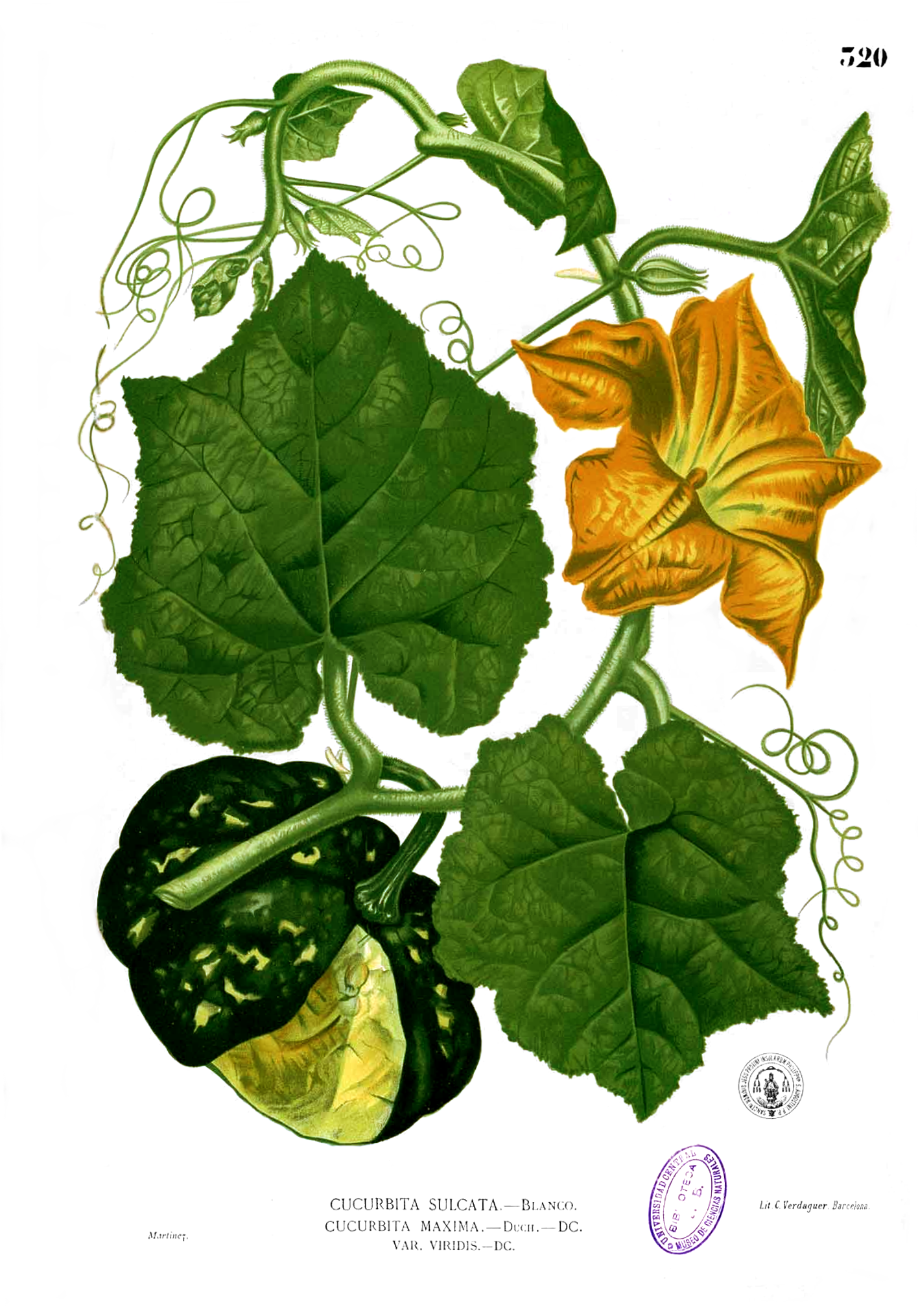

Scientific classification
- Kingdom: Plantae
- Clade: Tracheophytes
- Clade: Angiosperms
- Clade: Eudicots
- Clade: Rosids
- Order: Cucurbitales
- Family: Cucurbitaceae
- Genus: Cucurbita
- Species: C. maxima

Binomial name
- Cucurbita maxima Duchesne

Subspecies
- C. maxima subsp. andreana; C. maxima subsp. maxima

Synonyms
- Cucumis rapallito Carrière; Cucumis zapallito Carrière; Cucurbita farinae Mozz. ex Naudin; Cucurbita maxima var. triloba Millán; Cucurbita maxima var. turgida L.H.Bailey; Cucurbita maxima var. zapallito (Carrière) Millán; Cucurbita maxima var. zipinka Millán; Cucurbita pileiformis M.Roem.; Cucurbita rapallito Carrière; Cucurbita sulcata Blanco; Cucurbita turbaniformis M.Roem.; Cucurbita zapallito Carrière; Pepo maximus Peterm.; Pileocalyx elegans Gasp.

= Cucurbita maxima =

Species of flowering plant

Cucurbita maxima, one of at least five species of cultivated squash, is one of the most diverse domesticated species. This species originated in South America from the wild subspecies Cucurbita maxima subsp. andreana over 4,000 years ago. Cucurbita maxima, known for modern varieties as Hubbard, Delicious, Marblehead, Boston Marrow, and Turks Turban, originated in northern Argentina near the Andes or in certain Andean valleys. Secondary centers of diversity include India, Bangladesh, Myanmar, and the southern Appalachians.

Different squash types of this species were introduced into North America as early as the 16th century. By the American Revolution, the species was in cultivation by Native American tribes throughout the present-day United States. By the early 19th century, at least three varieties are known to have been commercially introduced in North America from seeds obtained from Native Americans.

== Types ==
=== Subspecies andreana ===
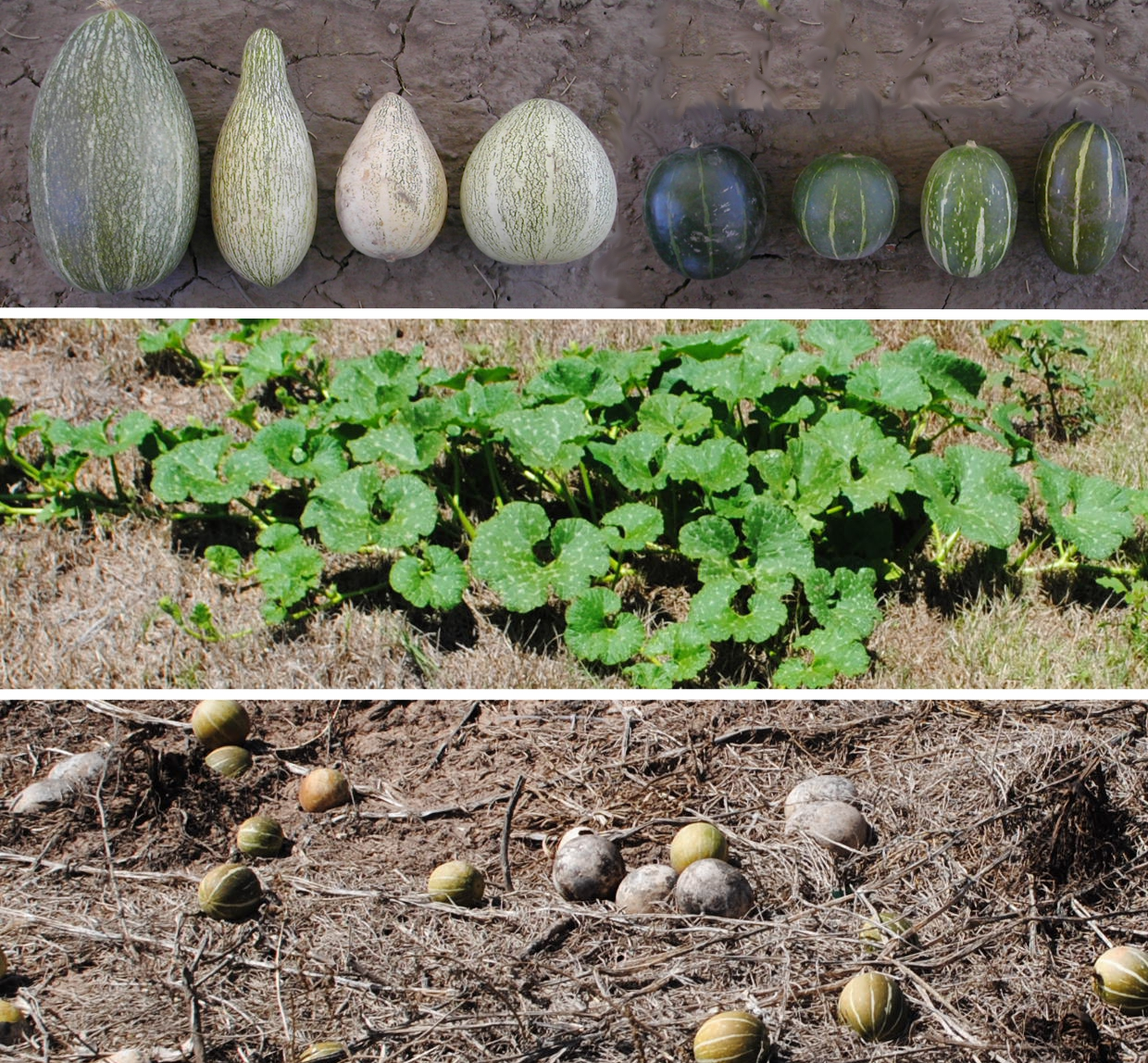
Cucurbita maxima subsp. andreana fruits (top), plant in the middle of the season (middle) and fruits left at the end of the season (bottom). The opaque ones are fruits left on earlier seasons from a different plant on the same place.

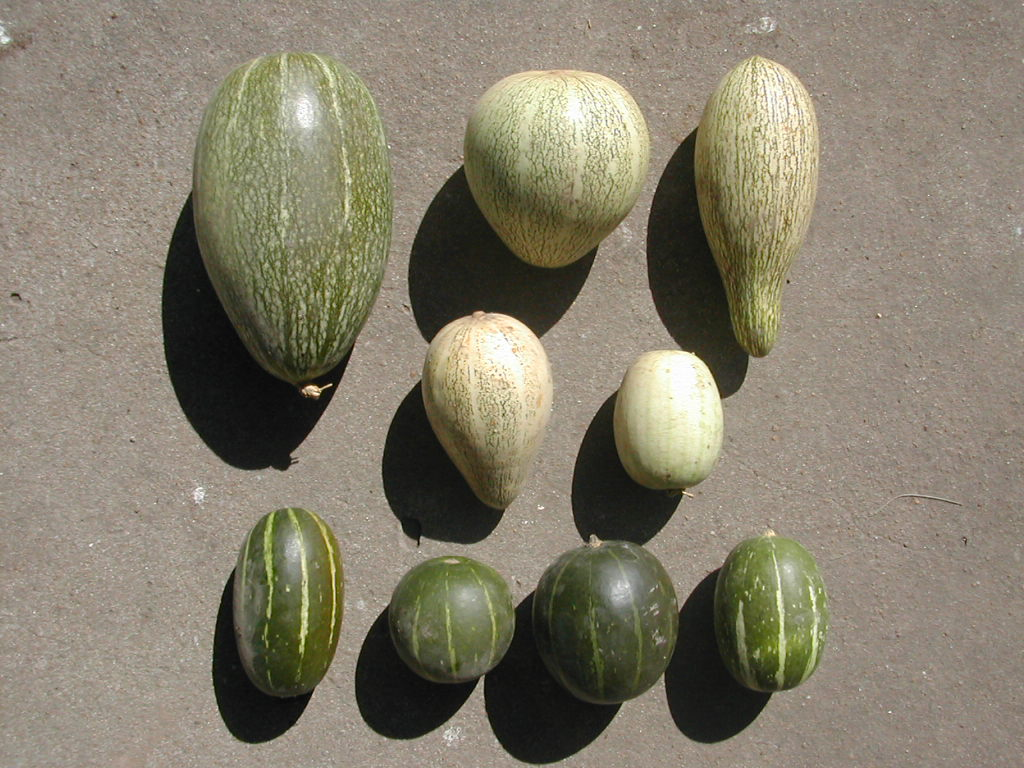
Different fruit types of C. maxima subsp. andreana from Argentina

As of October 2024, Cucurbita andreana is accepted as a separate species by some sources, and a subspecies of C. maxima by others. It was first formally described by Charles Victor Naudin in 1896, in Revue Horticole. It is native to Argentina and Uruguay and is the ancestor of the domesticated forms. C. andreana fruits are smaller and not palatable. It hybridizes readily with individuals of other C. maxima subspecies.

C. maxima subsp. andreana has notably different calcium levels from individuals of other C. maxima subspecies. C. andreana has yellow flowers and bright green striped fruit. Extrafloral nectaries are present in C. maxima but not necessarily in C. andreana.

=== Cultivars ===
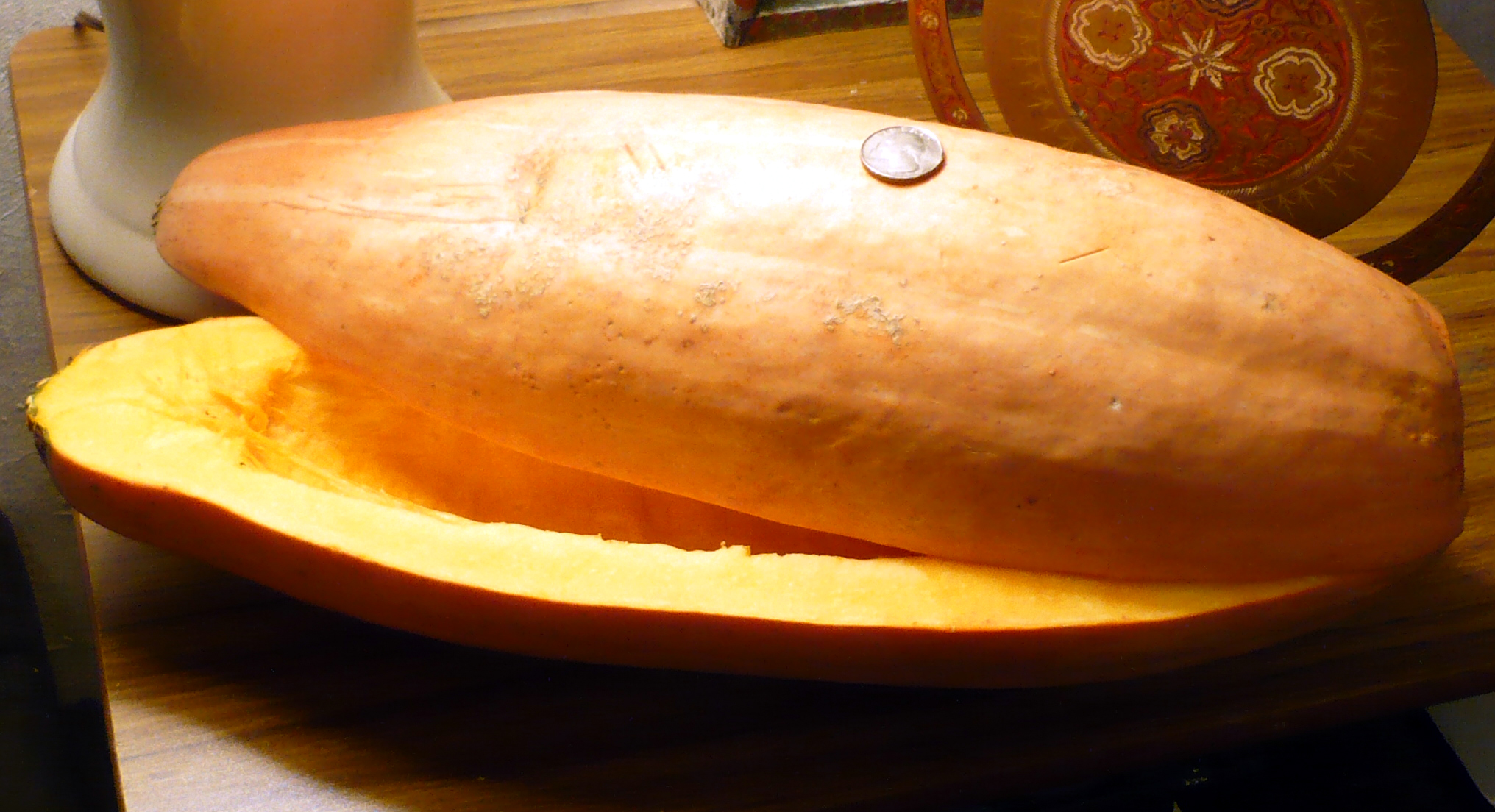
A Pink Banana squash, cut, with seeds removed, with a U.S. quarter for size comparison

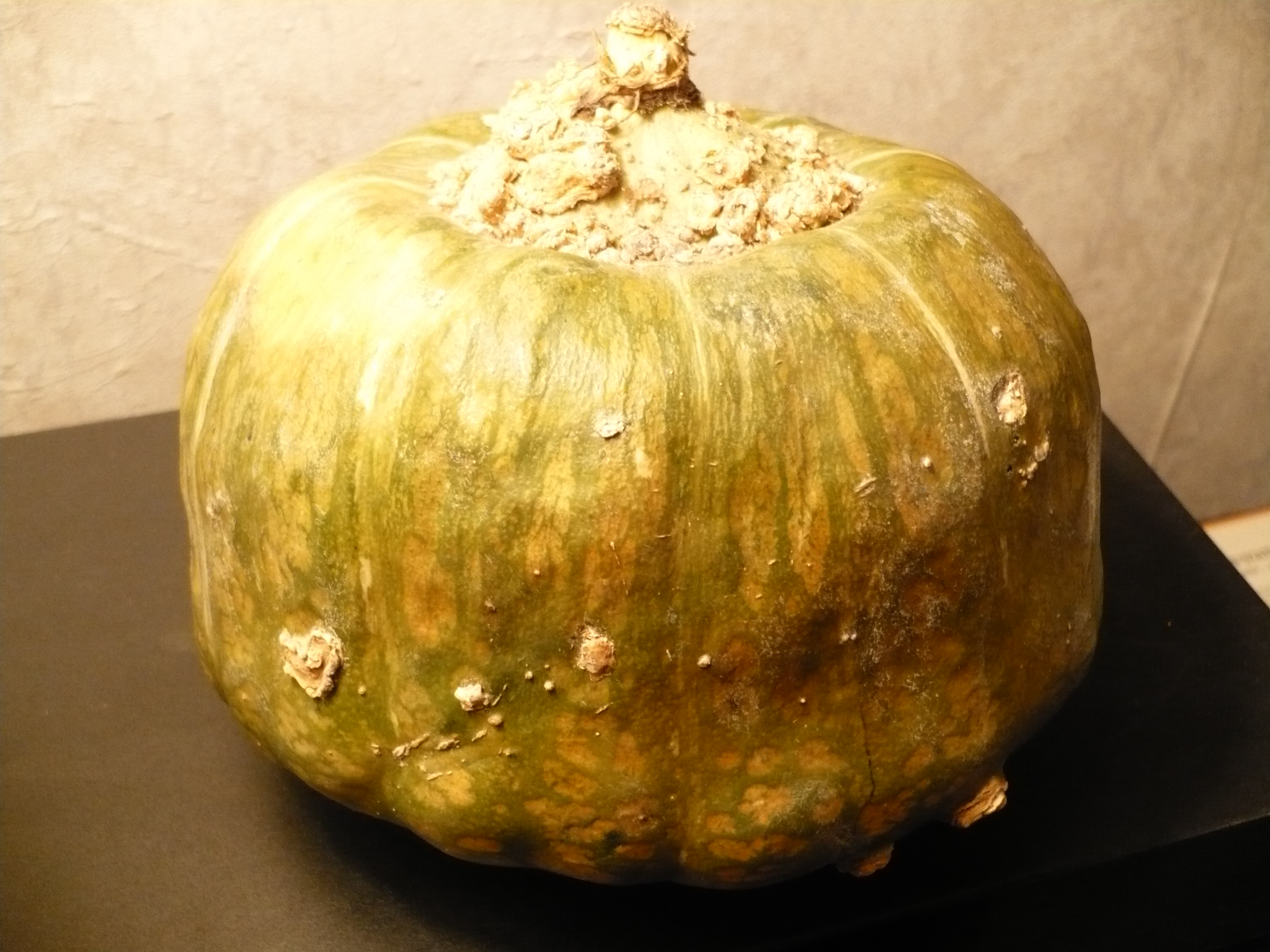
A buttercup squash

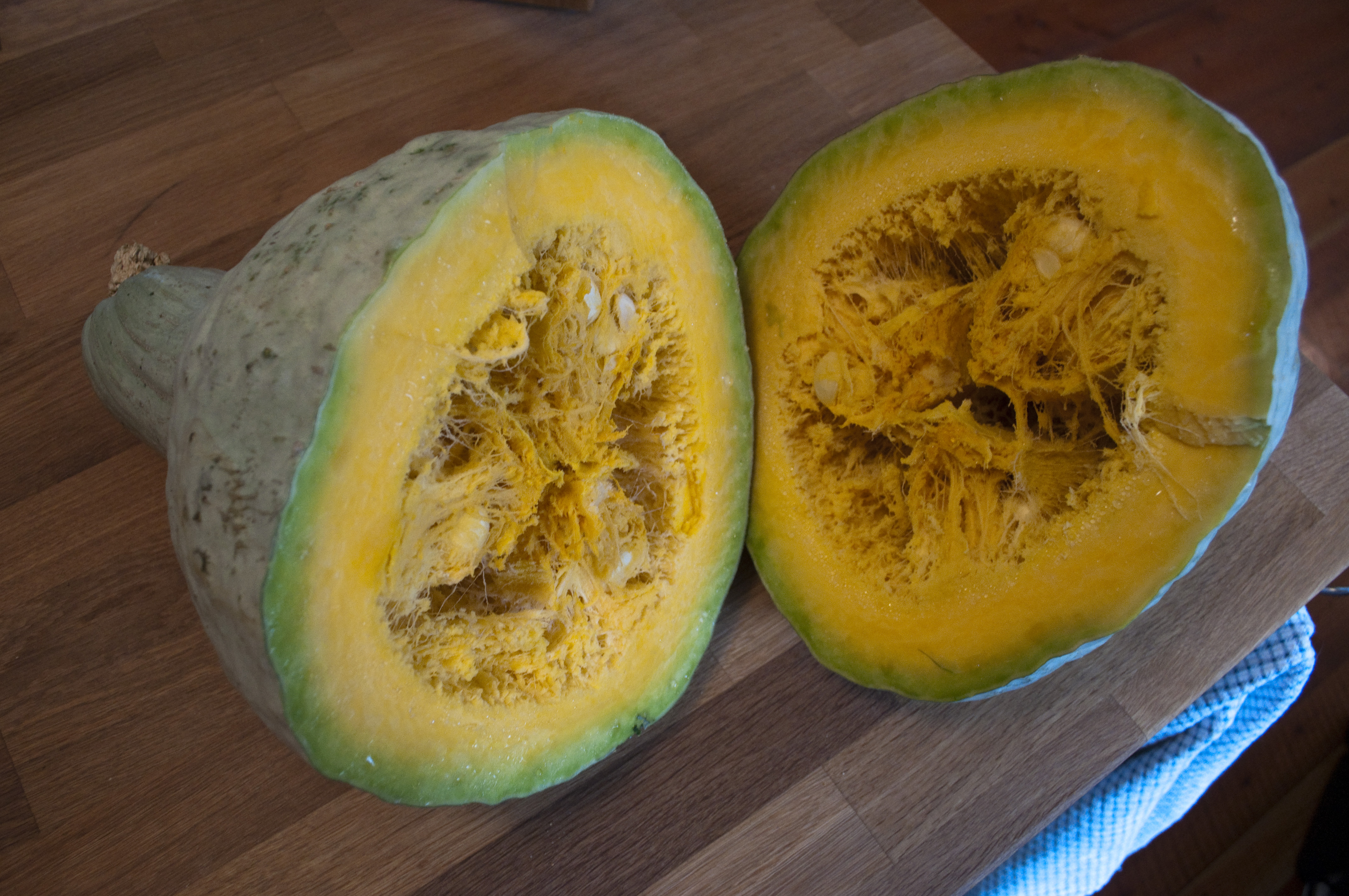
A cut open blue hubbard squash

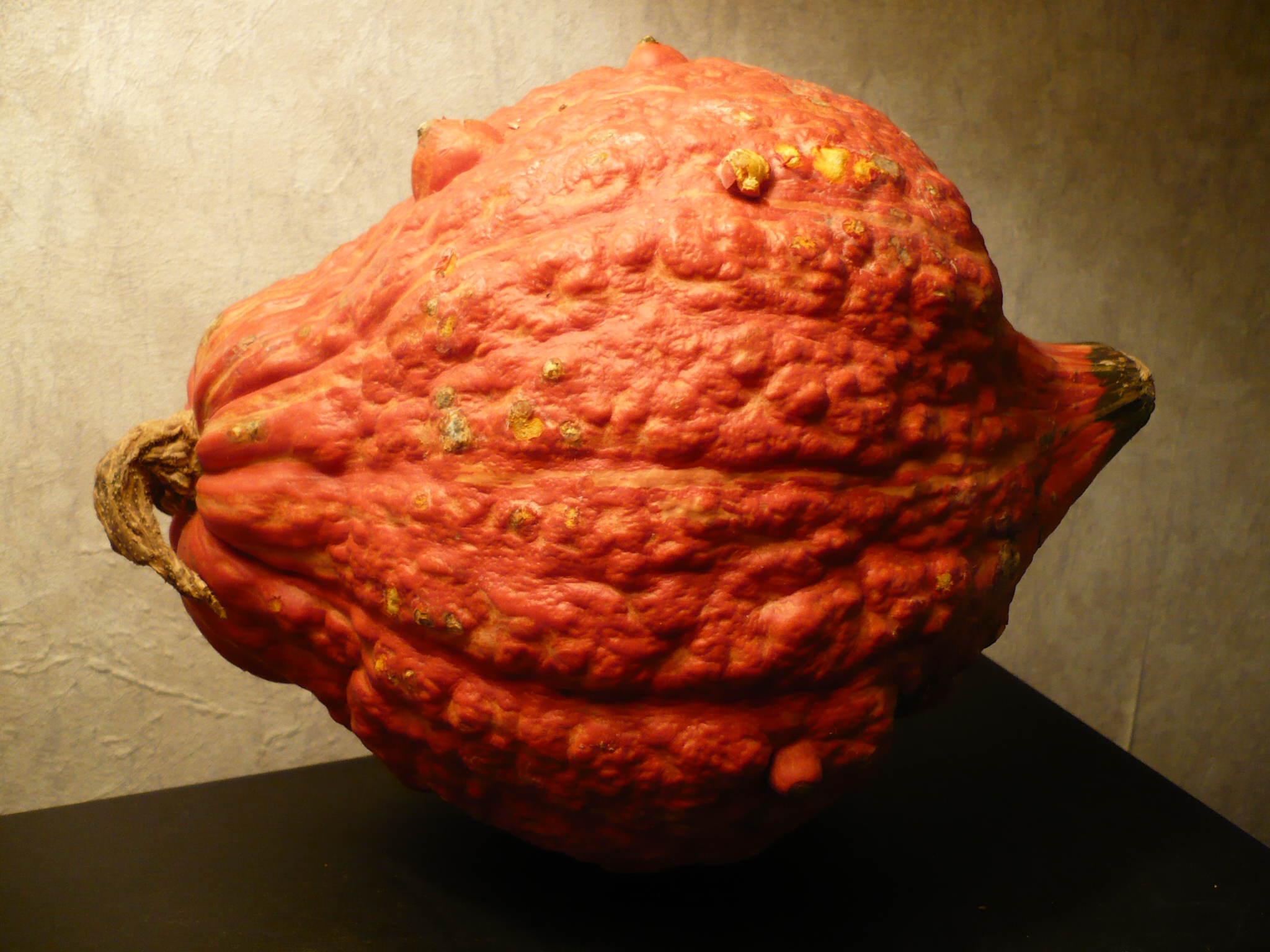
A golden Hubbard squash

- Arikara squash weighs from four to eleven pounds with a teardrop or round shape with a mottled orange and green color pattern. It is used both for its eating qualities and as decoration. This variety traces its ancestry to the Arikara tribe of the Dakotas, among whom its cultivation predates white settlement.
- Banana squash has an elongated shape, with light blue, pink, or orange skin and bright orange flesh.
- Boston marrow is sweet, narrow at one end, and bulbous at the other.
- Buttercup squash has a turban shape (a flattish top) and dark green skin, weighs three to five pounds, and features dense, yellow-orange flesh. Not to be confused with butternut squash.
- Candy roaster squash is a landrace developed by the Cherokee people in the southern Appalachians. A United States Department of Agriculture accession in 1960 notes that Candy Roasters had been grown for more than 100 years as of that date. It is variable in size and shape with more than 40 distinct forms according to one authority. Candy roasters consistently feature fine-textured orange flesh, while varying in size (from 5 kg (10 lb) to more than 113 kg (250 lb); shape (including round, cylindrical, teardrop, and blocky); and color (pink, tan, green, blue, gray, and orange). An article in the 1925 Charlotte Observer newspaper of Charlotte, North Carolina, provides an account of two candy roaster varieties at a Cherokee fair that were both of similar shape and size to a Catawba watermelon, one being colored like a citron melon and the other "pumpkin color".
- Hubbard squash usually has a tear-drop shape and is often used as a replacement for pumpkins in cooking. According to one source, the name comes from Bela Hubbard, settler of Randolph Township, Ohio, in the Connecticut Western Reserve. Other sources conclude that this variety came to Marblehead, Massachusetts, via Captain Knott Martin where Elizabeth Hubbard brought it to the attention of her neighbor, a seed trader named James J. H. Gregory. Gregory subsequently introduced it to the market using Hubbard as the eponym. Gregory later bred and released the Blue Hubbard, a variety with bluish-gray skin. Another variety, the Golden Hubbard, has a bright orange skin. Gregory advertisements for Hubbard squash had begun by 1859. The Hubbard squash, including questions regarding the name, is the subject of a children's ditty, "Raising Hubbard Squash in Vermont".
- Jarrahdale pumpkin is a pumpkin with gray skin that is nearly identical to Queensland Blue (though has more water content when roasted) and Sweet Meat varieties.
- JAP (or Kent) Pumpkin is the most common "pumpkin" eaten in Australia (known in other countries as a winter squash) it has a mottled/stripy dark green and cream skin. The flesh is a bright orange and the vines have been known to grow up to 15 fruit on them of at least 2 kg (4 lb) each. Known to grow in a wide variety of climates, it is favoured by backyard growers. Is as its best when roasted, the skin, flesh, and seeds are all edible.
- Kabocha is a Japanese variety with dark green skin and bright golden-orange flesh.
- Lakota squash is an American variety.
- Nanticoke squash was grown by the Nanticoke people of Delaware and Eastern Maryland. It is one of only a few surviving Native American winter squashes from the Eastern woodlands.
- Turban squash, also known as "French turban", predates 1820 and is closely related to the buttercup squash.

== Uses ==
Buttercup squash, a common cultivar, can be roasted, baked, and mashed into soups, among a variety of filler uses, much like pumpkin. It is extremely popular, especially as a soup, in Brazil, Colombia, and Africa.

All giant pumpkins are of this species, including the largest pumpkins ever documented, which attained a size of 1,247 kilograms (2,749 lb) as of 2023.

The seed of C. maxima is used in treating parasites in animals.

== Cultivation ==
Since this plant requires a fair amount of hot weather for best growth, it had not become very well established in northern Europe, the British Isles, or in similar areas with short or cool summers as of 1949. A strain of the squash (Cucurbita maxima Duchesne ex Lam.) known as a pumpkin is now cultivated in the British Isles.

The ideal soil pH range for cultivation ranges from 6.0 to 6.8.

Recommended spacing varies depending on the variety, generally, plants are spaced around 90–150 cm (3–5 ft) apart in rows that are approximately 180–300 cm (6–10 ft) apart. Planting depth of around 3–5 cm (1–2 in).

Fertilization should be carried out based on soil test results and specific crop nutrient requirements.

Many cultivars of Cucurbita maxima have been developed. Only long-vining plants are known in this species. As in C. pepo, plants exist with a "bush habit" that is particularly evident in young plants, but older plants grow in the wild-type vining manner.

== Gallery ==
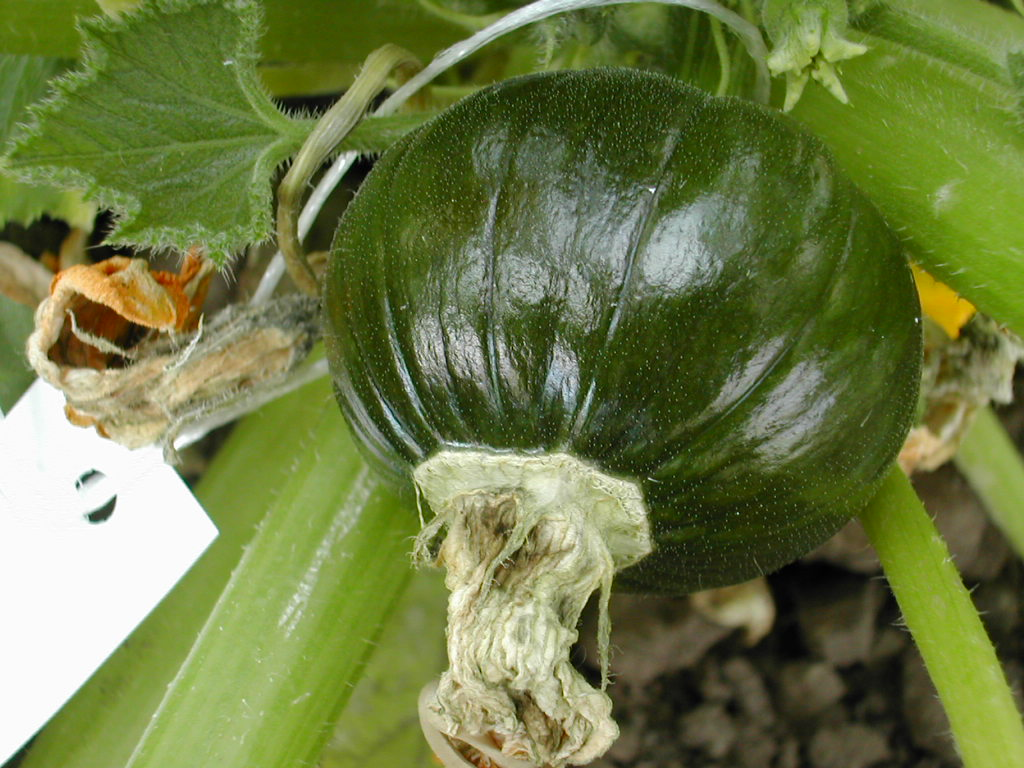
Typical "Zapallito" summer squash fruit

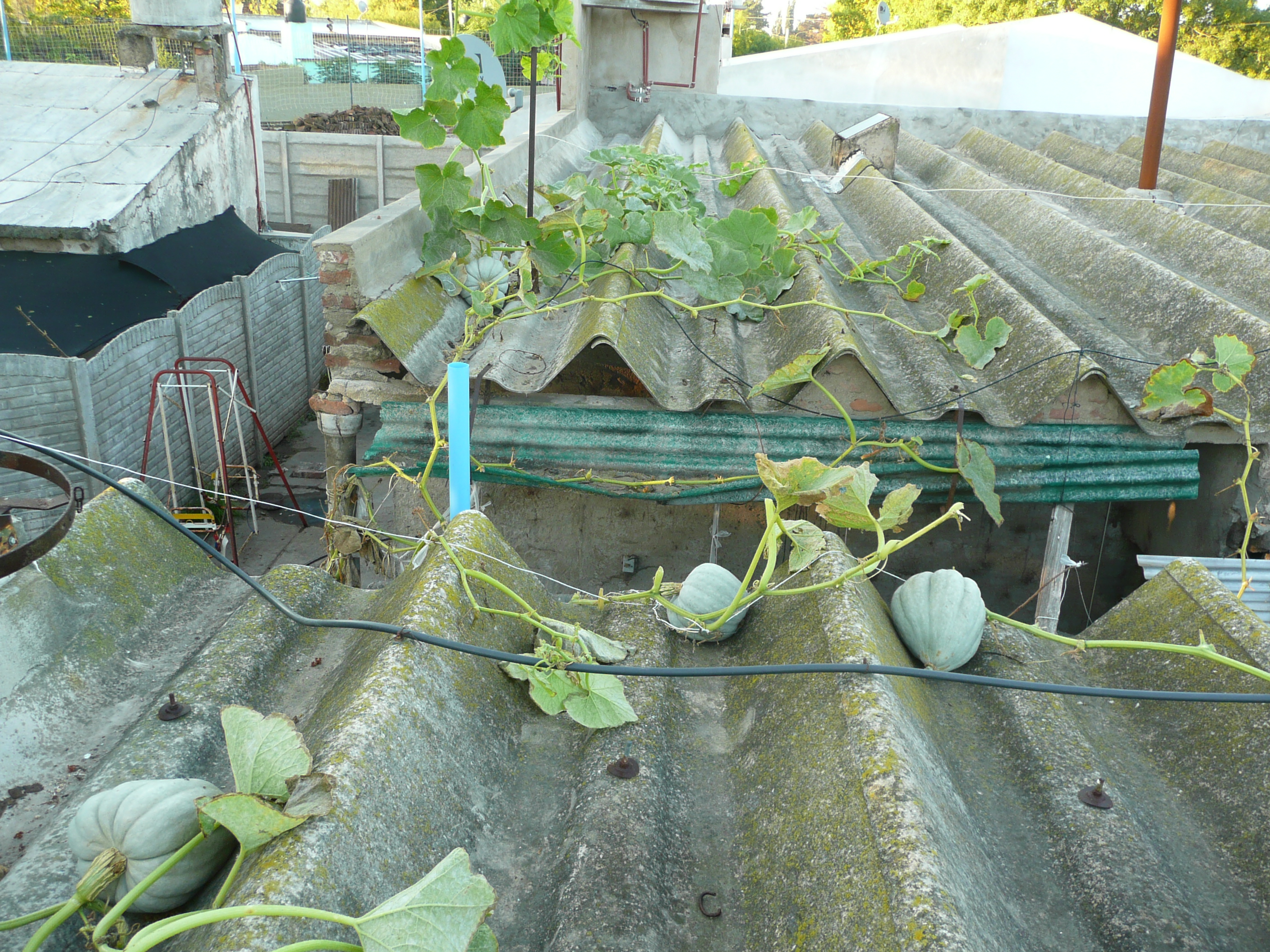
A vining cultivar growing up to a roof
