= Giant pumpkin =

Unusually large pumpkins

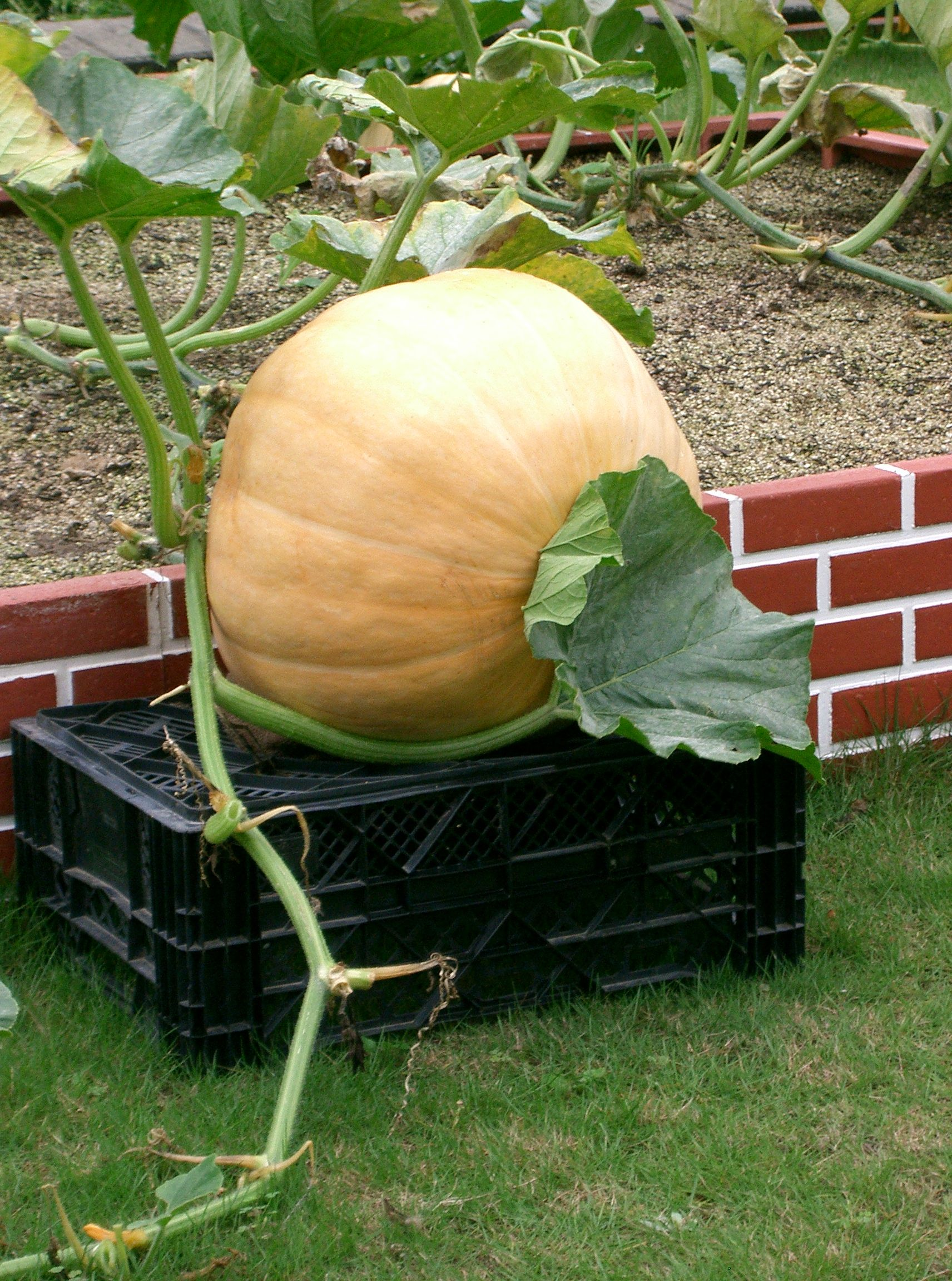
A giant pumpkin being grown in Japan

A giant pumpkin is a cultivar of the squash Cucurbita maxima grown for its prodigious size, commonly weighing from 68 kilograms (150 lb) to over 910 kilograms (2,010 lb). The practice of growing giant pumpkins dates to the 1800s, and world records were set beginning at the 1893 Chicago World's Fair. The practice experienced a revival in the 1970s, and records have since routinely been broken. As of 2026, the largest weighed 3,156 lb (1,432 kg). Giant pumpkins are grown more for their novelty than their utility, as large pumpkins are not particularly tasty—although they have been turned into boats and used for pumpkin chucking. Some 10,000 growers a year attempt giant pumpkins. Growing them is mostly a hobby, but record breaking pumpkins are valuable for their seeds and the prize money they can win.

== History ==
Growing giant pumpkins emerged from the North American agricultural tradition. The Smithsonian notes that "improbably", giant pumpkins trace themselves to Henry David Thoreau, who in 1857 grew a pumpkin weighing 123 lb (56 kg), which he detailed in his unfinished work Wild Fruits. The first competition giant pumpkins were grown by William Warnock of Ontario, Canada. His first record was 365 lb (166 kg), measured at the 1893 Chicago World's Fair. In 1900, Warnock's 400 lb (180 kg) pumpkin was exhibited at the Paris World's Fair, and won a bronze medal. He beat his own record four years later, and began to provide advice to other growers on how to achieve large pumpkin yields. Warnock's record stood for some 70 years before a pumpkin growing renaissance emerged, and records were quickly shattered. Growing giant pumpkins remains a mostly North American pursuit, especially in the Northeastern United States, although several recent record holders have been European.

Giant pumpkin growing has inspired numerous related activities, including giant pumpkin boat races, and pumpkin chucking. Giant pumpkins are often exhibited at county fairs and related exhibitions.

== Cultivation ==
Giant pumpkins are Cucurbita maxima, a different species from the pumpkins used for jack-o'-lanterns or pumpkin pies, which are usually C. pepo. C. maxima likely emerged from wild squash in South America near Buenos Aires. The fruits of wild Cucurbita maxima are around the size of a softball.

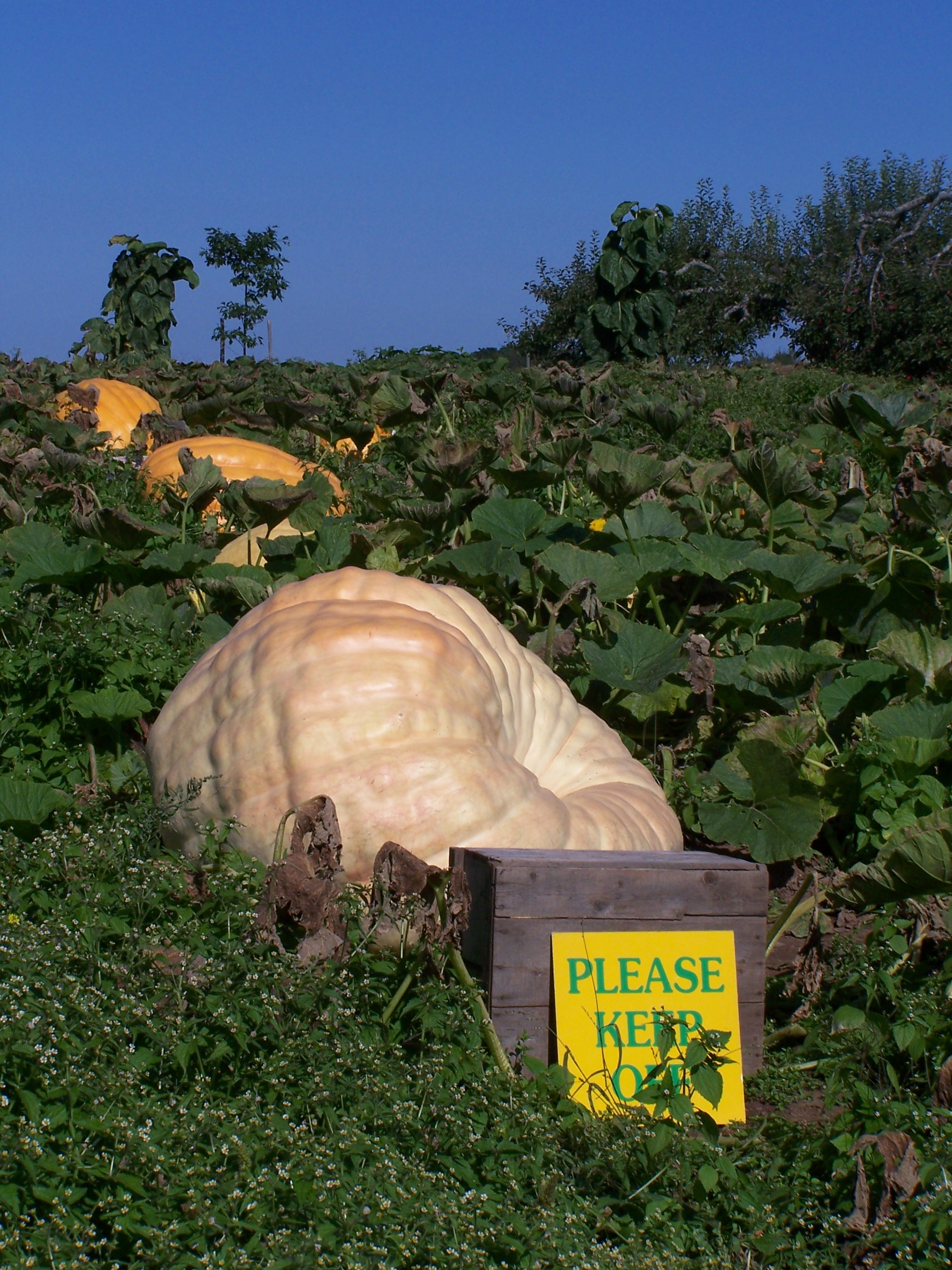
Giant pumpkins in Howard Dill's patch in Nova Scotia, Canada, 2004

Unusually large pumpkin cultivars have been sold since at least 1834, when the 'Mammoth' variety was first offered. Little formal scientific effort has gone into finding giant pumpkins, instead increasing yields have been selected by mostly ordinary growers. Many recent pumpkins have been of the 'Dill's Atlantic Giant' cultivar selected by Howard Dill and likely descended from 'Mammoth'. Seeds of prize winning giant pumpkins are extremely valuable, with single seeds selling for up to US$850. Pedigrees similar to ones used in horse racing have been adopted for use with giant pumpkins. Despite their enormous size, they are not generally eaten, as they are not particularly tasty, and may be inedible.

Giant pumpkins may expand by up to 50 lb (23 kg) a day. This is made possible by several genetic adaptions. Giant pumpkin cells grow larger than regular pumpkins, and are composed of more water (up to 94%). They also lack genes that stop fruit growth, resulting in continuous expansion. Once pumpkins grow so large, they tend to no longer be round but will flatten out under their own intense weight. They will often form an arch shape on the bottom of the pumpkin for additional support as they "pancake" out. Some pumpkins may even collapse under their own weight, and transporting them is a significant challenge due to their fragility. Champion growers often grow many pumpkins, as pumpkins that crack under their own weight will be disqualified from competition.

Genetics are only part of the enormous size growers can achieve. Improved agricultural techniques, including pruning so that there is only one fruit per vine, maximizing soil tilth, and modern pest control, are important factors. Pumpkins grown at high latitudes tend to be larger, as they have longer daylight hours and cooler, but shorter, summer seasons. However, seasons can be extended in the north by using cloches or other coverings. The time from seeding to harvest is usually 130 to 140 days, compared to 90 to 120 days for non giants. Folk wisdom in the early 20th century held that feeding milk to the pumpkins would help them grow, but that does not likely affect size. Modern growers may use professional soil laboratory analysis to ensure ideal soil nutrition. Giant pumpkins are heavy feeders, and some farmers may use large quantities of chicken manure to fertilize pumpkins, following in the footsteps of Warnock, whose first champion fruits were fertilized by chicken manure. Fungal mycorrhizal and Azospirillum bacterial soil amendments have gained popularity in recent years.

== World record giant pumpkins by year ==
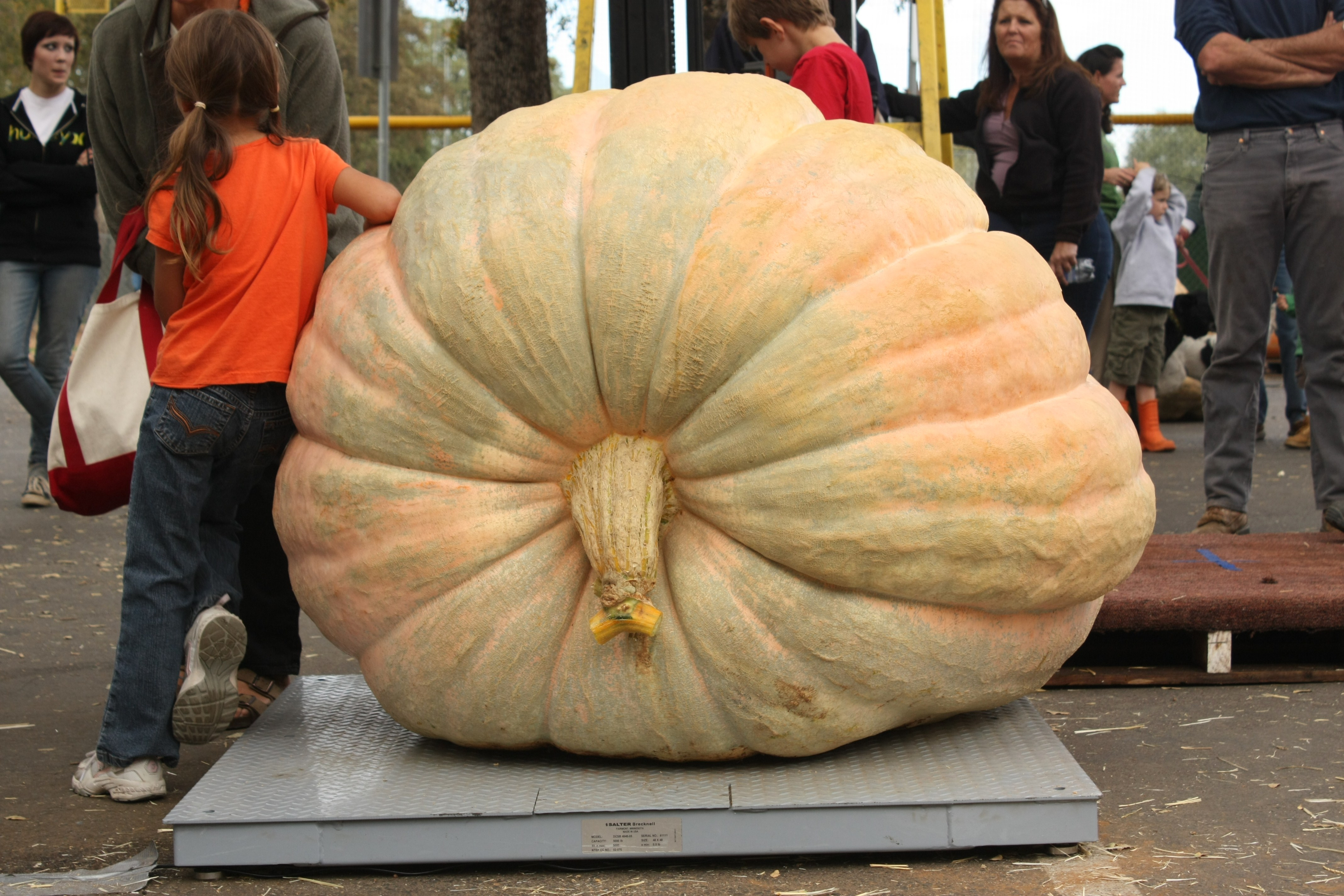
Pumpkin at the Auburn Community Festival

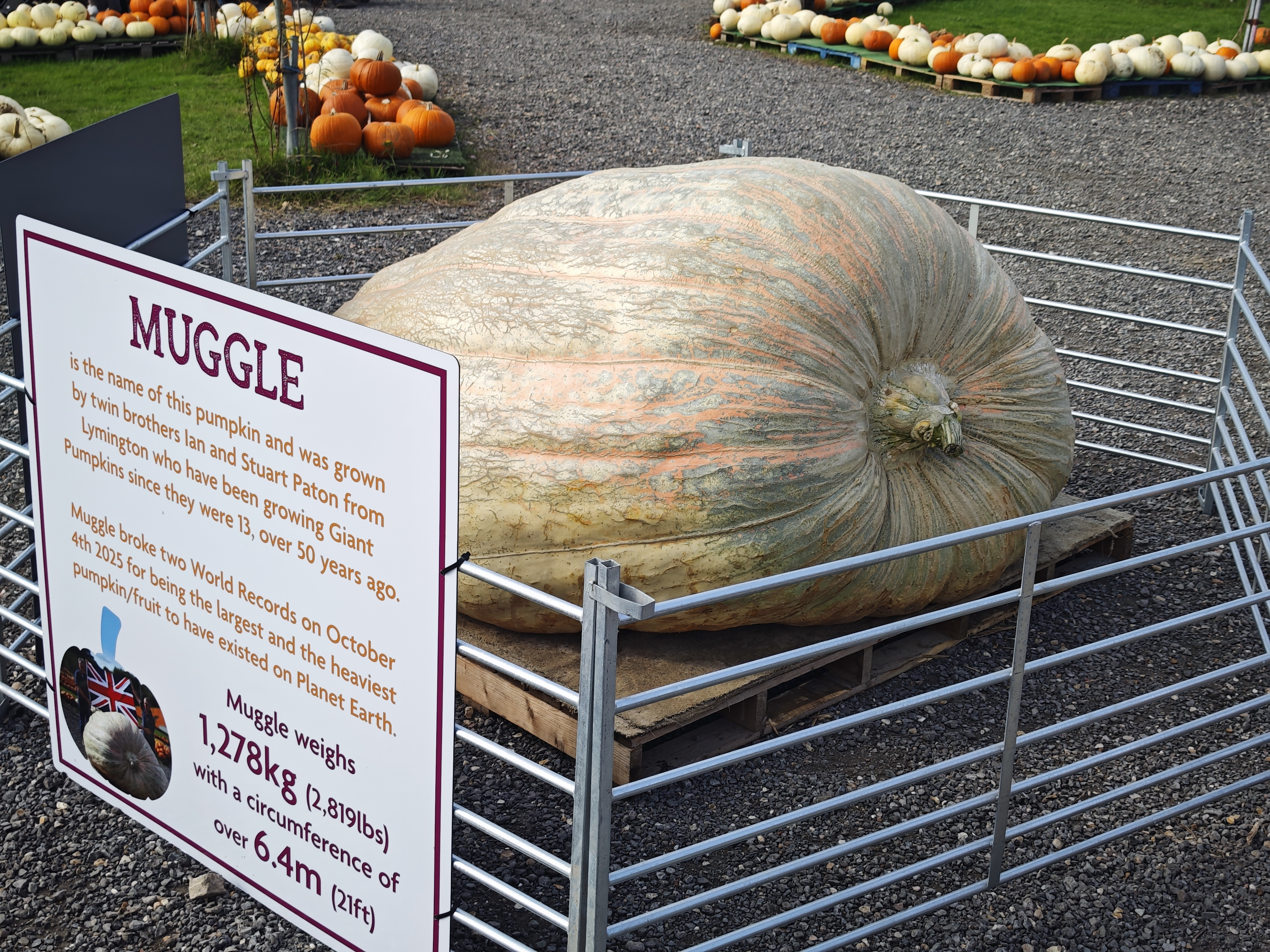
"Muggle": former world record size pumpkin weighing 2,819.3 lb (1,278.8 kg), grown by Ian and Stuart Paton from Lymington, England. Photographed in October 2025 while on public display at Sunnyfields Farm in Totton as part of its annual "Pumpkin Time" event.

Since the 1970s, the largest-pumpkin record has regularly been beaten. Given this regularity and the overall rate of increase, there appear to still be substantial genetic and cultural improvements to be made in giant pumpkin growing. Structurally, calculations by David Hu of Georgia Tech estimate that a perfect pumpkin could grow up to 20,000 lb (9,100 kg) without breaking. Other factors, such as overly rapid hydration, can still cause fruit to crack. This occurs when the volume of delivered fluids outpaces the growth rate and flexibility of the skin, much like a bursting balloon. The true upper limit regardless of structural stability and cracks is likely determined by other factors. For example, the number of sieve tube elements in the sugar-conducting phloem in a stem limits the amount of resources available to grow the fruit. There are also limitations imposed by the climate, diseases, pests, and growing season duration. Every year, about 10,000 growers attempt to grow champion pumpkins, and several thousand make it to official weigh-offs. Though mostly a hobby activity, pumpkin growing may be lucrative at the top end; the 2026 world championship of pumpkin growing was offering $30,000 to the next world record breaking pumpkin.

World record holders
Year	Grower	Country	Weight	Reference
2026 (10 Oct.)	Ron Wallace	United States	3,156.0 lb (1,431.5 kg)	
2026 (3 Oct.)	Ian Paton	United Kingdom	2,856.8 lb (1,295.8 kg)	
2025	Ian and Stuart Paton	United Kingdom	2,819.3 lb (1,278.8 kg)	
2023	Travis Gienger	United States	2,749 lb (1,247 kg)	
2021	Stefano Cutrupi	Italy	2,703 lb (1,226 kg)	
2016	Mathias Willemijns	Belgium	2,624.6 lb (1,190.5 kg)	
2014	Beni Meier	Switzerland	2,323.7 lb (1,054.0 kg)	
2013	Tim Mathison	United States	2,032 lb (922 kg)	
2012	Ron Wallace	United States	2,009 lb (911 kg)	
2011	Jim and Kelsey Bryson	Canada	1,818.5 lb (824.9 kg)	
2010	Chris Stevens	United States	1,810.5 lb (821.2 kg)	
2009	Christy Harp	United States	1,725 lb (782 kg)	
2007	Joe Jutras	United States	1,689 lb (766 kg)	
2006	Ron Wallace	United States	1,502 lb (681 kg)	^{[a]}
2005	Larry Checkon	United States	1,469 lb (666 kg)	^{[a]}
2004	Al Eaton	Canada	1,446 lb (656 kg)	^{[a]}
2003	Steve Daletas	United States	1,385 lb (628 kg)	^{[a]}
2002	Charlie Houghton	United States	1,337.6 lb (607 kg)	^{[a]}
2001	Geneva Emmons	United States	1,262 lb (572 kg)	^{[a]}
2000	Dave Stelts	United States	1,140 lb (517 kg)	^{[a]}
1999	Gerry Checkon	United States	1,131 lb (513 kg)	^{[a]}
1998	Gary Burke	Canada	1,092 lb (495 kg)	^{[a]}
1996	Nathan and Paula Zehr	United States	1,061 lb (481 kg)	^{[a]}
1994	Herman Bax	Canada	990 lb (449 kg)	^{[a]}
1993	Donald Black	United States	884 lb (401 kg)	^{[a]}
1992	Joel Holland	United States	827 lb (375 kg)	^{[a]}
1990	Ed Gancarz	United States	816.5 lb (370 kg)	^{[a]}
1989	Gordon Thomson	Canada	755 lb (342 kg)	^{[a]}
1984	Norm Gallagher	United States	612 lb (276 kg)	^{[a]}
1981	Howard Dill	Canada	493.5 lb (224 kg)	^{[a]}
1980	Howard Dill	Canada	459 lb (208 kg)	^{[a]}
1976	Edgar Van Wyck	Canada	453 lb (206 kg)	
1976	Bob Ford	United States	451 lb (205 kg)	^{[a]}
1904	William Warnock	Canada	403 lb (183 kg)	^{[a]}
1900	William Warnock	Canada	400 lb (181 kg)	

Additionally, in 2022 Ian and Stuart Paton grew a pumpkin weighing 2,907.85 lb (1,318.98 kg)—the heaviest ever measured at the time—but it was disqualified due to being damaged.

== See also ==
- Half Moon Bay Art and Pumpkin Festival
