= Chumash traditional medicine =

Traditional medicine practiced by the Chumash people

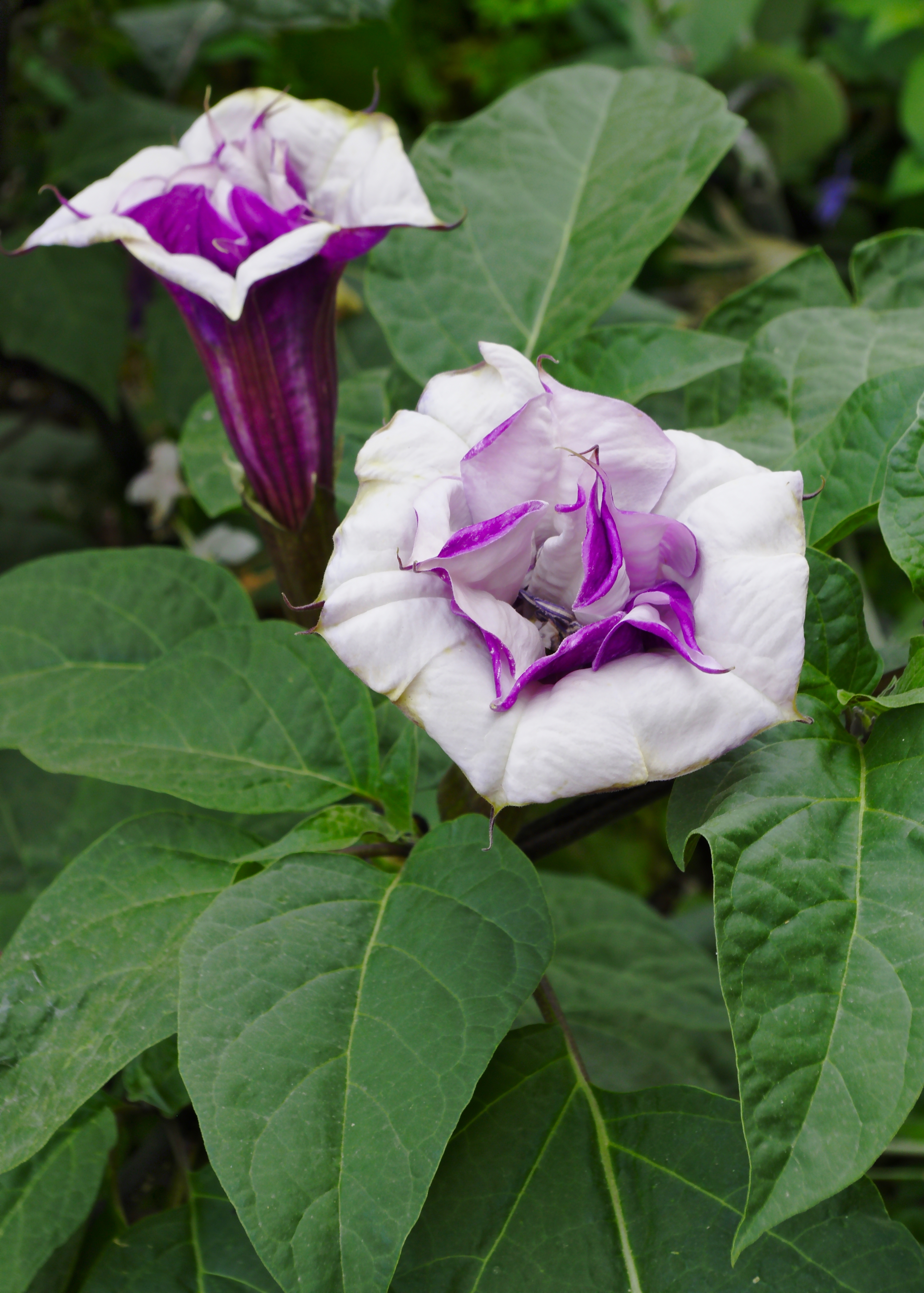
Datura plant, commonly used in traditional Chumash spirituality

Chumash traditional medicine is a type of traditional medicine practiced by the Chumash people of the southern coastal regions of California.

Chumash medicine focused on treating mind, spirit, and body alike to promote the wellness of both the individual and the larger community. Healing practices included a knowledge of local plants, as well as a mix of spiritual practices including prayer, singing, and dancing. Post-European contact, Chumash healers adapted these methods to treat changes in environment and the introduction of deadly diseases. Prevention was key in promoting health, and healers took responsibility for ensuring all people worked and felt valued in the community.

In the modern day, certain medicinal practices are viewed as controversial, including the treatment of menstruating women, the use of poisonous datura plant, and the consumption of dangerous polycyclic aromatic hydrocarbons.

== Herbalism ==
=== List of Chumash medicinal herbs ===
The climate of the Chumash territory supported a variety of plant species, many of which were used in medicine. The following list provides a sampling of commonly used plants in Chumash healing practices, but cannot be considered complete.

Chumash Medicinal Herbs
| Plant | Uses |
|---|---|
| Common yarrow | Toothache, cuts, excessive bleeding |
| Sacapellote | Cough, cold, lung congestion, asthma, constipation |
| Chamise | Childbirth and menstrual complications |
| Ribbonwood (Red shanks) | Toothache, gangrene, cold, tetanus, spasms, lockjaw, paralysis, ulcers, sore throats |
| Maidenhair fern | Blood disorders, regulation of menstruation, bleeding, internal injuries, kidney and liver problems |
| Coffee fern | See maidenhair fern |
| Agave | Boils |
| Wild onion | Appetite stimulant, sores, insect repellant, snake and insect bites |
| Scarlet pimpernel | Disinfectant, eczema, ringworm |
| Yerba mansa | Cuts, sores, rheumatism, venereal disease, cough, cold, asthma, kidney problems |
| Coastal sagebrush | Headache, paralysis, poison oak rash, disinfectant |
| Mugwort | Cauterizing wounds, skin lesions, blisters, rheumatism, headache, toothache, asthma, measles, burns, infections |
| California croton | Colds |
| Coyote brush (Chaparral broom) | Poison oak rash |
| Spurge | Fever, snakebite and spider bites |
| Pineapple weed | Gastrointestinal disorders, regulation of menstruation, dysentery, inflammation, fever |
| Soap plant | Consumption |
| Spineflower | Fever, warts, skin diseases |
| Creek clematis | Ringworm, skin disruptions, venereal disease, colds, sore throat |
| Wild gourd | Purgative, rheumatism, nosebleed, |
| Durango root | Sore throat |
| Toloache (Jimsonweed) | Pain relief, divination |
| Rattlesnake weed | Rattlesnake bite |
| Coastal wood fern | Wounds, sprains, bruises |
| California fuchsia | Cuts, sores, sprains |
| Yerba santa | Colds, chest pain, cough, fever |
| California buckwheat | Rheumatism, irregular menstruation, respiratory problems |
| California poppy | Lice, colic, toothache, stomachache, analgesic |
| Sneezeweed | Colds, flu, scurvy |
| Sticky cinquefoil | Fever, stomach problems, Spanish flu |
| Wedge-leaved horkelia | See stick cinquefoil |
| California juniper | Rheumatism, genito-urinary disorders |
| Peppergrass | Diarrhea, dysentery |
| Giant rye | Gonnorhea |
| Chuchupate | pain relief, stomachache, flatulence, headache, rheumatism |
| Climbing penstemon | Runny nose, sore throats, wounds |
| Laurel sumac | Dysentery |
| Bull mallow | Colds, cough, fever, stomach problems |
| Cheeseweed | See Bull mallow |

=== Similarity to Chinese herbalism ===
Certain aspects of Chumash healing practices have been compared to those used in Chinese healing. The use of certain healing touches, as well as spiritual practices in healing are well-documented in both cultures. Notably, plants of the same genus were often used to achieve the same healing effect. For example, the poppies Papaver californicum in California and Papaver somniferum were used to treat pain. Both species contain morphine and papaverine, powerful opiates. Several other medicinal parallels between the two cultures exist, including the use of diterpenoids and flavones to treat skin irritations and flavonols and tannins for diarrhea.

==== Spiritual foundations ====
Both medical philosophies rely on maintaining the balance between two forces; Yin and Yang for the Chinese, a similar Chumash concept being “the Sun and Sky Coyote“. In Chinese practice, Yin is the inhibiting force, while Yang is the activating. The Sun and Sky Coyote personify the dualistic philosophy of the Chumash, the hot sun and cool sky.

As with traditional Chinese medicine treatment principles, balance must be maintained to achieve good health, and treatment for illness usually looks to fortify whichever side is lacking, as determined by a trained healer. This duality is represented in divisions of day and night, male and female, and hot and cold, etc. For example, treatment of diseases caused by excess “cold” would include plant remedies which “warm” the patient, such as those with adrenergic properties that increase heart rate and blood flow. This principle was behind the Chumash practices of bathing daily in cold water, as well as using sweat lodges and hot springs to harness the healing properties of heat.

==== Cross-cultural contact ====
Some historians argue that Chinese explorers landed in California in the early 15th century, as well as other Pre-Columbian transoceanic contact theories, but the validity of such claims remain in dispute. However, it is likely that Polynesian peoples had contact with both the Chinese and Indigenous peoples of California, potentially facilitating the transfer of herbology.

Still some maintain that humans innately look to plants as potential medicines, and only those groups which successfully utilize plants are able to survive.

== Spiritualism in healing ==
For the Chumash people, spiritual practices played an equally important role as medicinal plants in the healing process.

Body, mind, and spirit were seen as indistinguishable, so treatments had to account for all aspects of the self to be effective. The first remedies focused on the spiritual to open the mind and body to healing.

In Chumash culture, the most important work of the healer was thought to occur before anyone fell ill by helping foster a balance of tribal values.

Obesity was virtually non-existent, largely due to diet and a culture which did not tolerate laziness, seen to lead to excessive weight gain. By working all day, the Chumash kept physically fit, reducing the prevalence of cardiovascular disease and hypertension. The value of being an essential part of the community was thought to help strengthen the spirit. Additionally, it was common for the Chumash to bathe regularly, promoting good hygiene habits and as a preventative against disease.

Healers regularly encouraged these practices, and they themselves practiced routine fasting and prayer in order to strengthen their spirits.

Before treating a patient, the healer would begin with prayer to invite the participation of God (Xoy in Chumash) in the healing process. A patient would often lie beside a fire to benefit from the therapeutic warmth and sound of the flames. As healing was also seen as a communal process, the patient was often joined by family and friends who might offer support by participation in dancing, singing, fasting, and praying.

Generally, white sage was burned in a seashell to strengthen the spirit and help calm the patient, keeping them in a rational, coherent state. The shell was moved so as to allow the smoke to touch all parts of the patient. Small amounts of "momoy" could be given to those who did not listen well, or had domineering personalities, to help them relax. Humor was another valuable tool for the healer to relieve anxieties and allow the patient's spirit a chance to heal.

== Women's health ==
Chumash women were respected as life-bringers and nurturers of family and community. As such, there was a variety of practices and treatments to help them through menstruation, childbirth, lactation, and menopause.

=== Menstruation ===
Women were kept isolated during menstruation and prohibited from eating meat or drinking cold water for three days. They also could not bathe, despite daily bathing being common in Chumash culture. Instead, they used the leaves of Wooly Bluecurls as douches. White sage was used to control heavy bleeding. Dysmenorrhea and premenstrual syndrome were treated with mugwort or Paeonia californica. Many treatments could be harmful in large doses and required careful ministrations.

=== Urinary tract infection ===
Urinary tract infections were treated with medicinal herbal teas meant to increase urination and raise the pH of the urine, creating a hostile environment for bacteria. Teas could be made from Ephedra viridis or Ephedra californica, as well as corn silk.

=== Childbirth ===
If possible, childbirth took place in a special hut under the guidance of a midwife, though it was not uncommon for pregnant women to give birth on their own if they were too far from the village.

Mugwort was burned as aromatherapy to ease labor pains. Trichostema lanatum and Trichostema lanceolatum also relieved pain and was used to facilitate delivery of the afterbirth. These plants could then be used as a douche. The umbilical cord was cut with a knife made from carrizo cane and ash was spread on the infant's navel to stop the bleeding. After giving birth, women bathed in cold water.

Husbands were prohibited from touching their wives after childbirth until the child could walk on its own.

=== Venereal diseases ===
Gonorrhea afflicted the Chumash people pre-European contact, but cases of the disease increased with the rise of Spanish missions, decreasing fertility. Rock powder was believed to increase fertility. Yerba mansa was believed to cure gonorrhea, as well as many other afflictions. Seawater as a source of saline and other healing minerals was used to treat sores from venereal diseases, as well as medicinal tea made from carrizo cane.

== European colonization and Chumash health ==
=== Chumash and alcohol ===
In contrast to the Chumash use of psychotropic substances such as peyote and datura (jimsonweed) in ritualistic practices, there is no indication that the Chumash used any form of fermented alcohol, similarly to other indigenous peoples throughout North and South America prior to European contact.

As explored by cross-cultural study, the Chumash predisposition to alcohol abuse does not seem to stem from biological factors, but rather is a product of many societal factors.

One major contributor to Chumash alcohol use appears to be the spiritual relationship of the Chumash to altered states of consciousness from botanical substances, such as datura. In addition, the absence of fermented beverages in pre-colonial Chumash society meant an absence of societal norms for dealing with alcohol use, contrary to the methods of prohibition or moderation practiced in most European societies. Thus, when the moderate to heavy drinking found in European frontier communities was introduced to the Chumash and other Native peoples, they were at a much higher risk for abuse.

This high rate of abuse has led to a number of modern methods of alleviation, including non-native ones such as Alcoholics Anonymous (AA) and Native practices involving spiritual and communal efforts to break addiction.

Research on levels of alcohol dehydrogenase (ADH) and aldehyde dehydrogenase (ALDH), enzymes responsible for alcohol breakdown and clearance, also indicates no biological predisposition to alcoholism for Southwest California Native Americans (such as the Chumash). There is evidence of genetic protective elements against alcohol dependence in many Native Americans, which has further discredited theories of its biological inevitability.

=== Spanish colonization ===
1769 marked the beginning of Spanish military and religious missions to assimilate Chumash in the Alta region of California, roughly around modern-day Santa Barbara. This date also coincides with apparent changes to the Chumash environment and way of life that invoked declines in Chumash health.

Prior to colonization, the Chumash enjoyed ecological abundance and diversity even during cyclical droughts and El Niño events, indicating a millennia-long period of acclimatization to their environment. However, this stability was significantly altered by European contact.

Traditionally, historical narratives have attributed declines in Chumash health to European oppression. However, this narrative has been replaced by a more nuanced perspective consisting of exacerbated environmental fluctuations from overpopulation and over-utilization of natural resources due to Spanish colonization. This effect was in conjunction with the devastating effects of European diseases on Chumash people, which likely began impacting the Chumash in the late 16th century.

The effect of Spanish overpopulation and resource depletion is documented by Catholic missionary Fr. Gregorio Fernandez in 1803. His letter documents the increasing number of Chumash migrants to Spanish missions, not because of increasing conversions but because of the devastation of Chumash agriculture and plants (particularly their staple of the acorn) caused primarily by overexploitation of Spanish cattle-grazing. The religious conversion of Chumash also corresponds to documented disease increases and poorer health post-colonization recorded by even the early Spanish conquistadors.

== Controversial practices ==
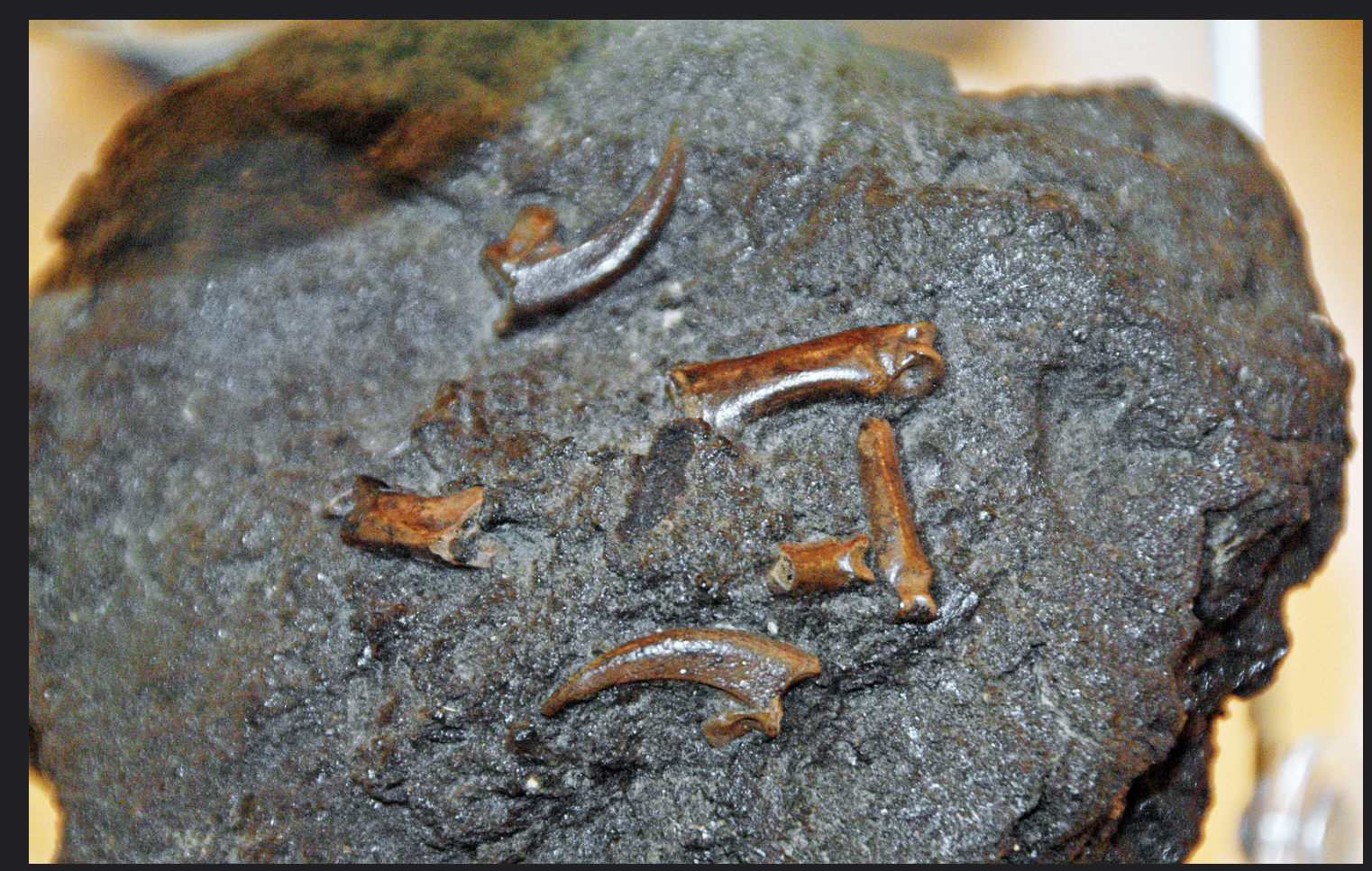
Fossil bird bones and talons in tar, found in Kern County, California, similar to that encountered by Chumash Indians

=== Polycyclic aromatic hydrocarbon consumption ===
Polycyclic aromatic hydrocarbons (PAHs), a chemical product of fossil fuels found in substances such as gasoline, tar, and cigarettes, cause adverse health effects such as neurological disorders, hormonal disruptions, and fetal abnormalities.

Before the industrial era, the predominant form of PAHs was found in natural bitumen from fossils, and the Chumash ancestral homeland was of the most concentrated regions of bitumen in the world. They utilized it in myriad materials, including the waterproofing of tomol canoes and water-carrying baskets.

Thus, the Chumash have been a target of interest for research on PAH exposure, owing to their prolific use of PAH-containing bitumen over the previous millennia (with evidence of use in objects as far back as 10,000 years ago).

Wärmländer et al. have studied the skeletons of Chumash between 6500 BCE and the beginning of significant European contact (mid-1700s) and found a number of consistent decreases in Chumash health over the time of bitumen use. Among these markers was systematic decreases in skull size for both males and females over the studied timescale, indicating both decreased birthweight and neurological development over millennia.

While such adverse health outcomes are consistent with PAH exposure, some researchers dispute that there is a direct link between bitumen use and decreased Chumash health over millennia. Chumash expert Patricia Lambert of Utah State University has questioned this hypothesis, citing the need for increased research on the controversial topic.

=== Cancer prevention and remedy ===
Cancer is another controversial topic among Chumash researchers and medical professionals, as PAH exposure increases the incidence of cancers.

Chumash methods were developed to deal with cancer management. Spiritual practices, integral to Chumash medicinal practices, sometimes included the use of hallucinogenic substances, along with techniques such as hypnosis though chanting.

It is also hypothesized that a number of plants consumed by the Chumash may have alleviated the harmful effects of PAH exposure, leading to modern theories about botanical and nutritive cancer-prevention substances.

=== Sacred datura ===
Datura (also called momoy by the Chumash) is a hallucinogenic plant commonly consumed as a liquid in traditional Chumash spiritual practice. Early anthropological records indicate adolescent males and females would receive datura from a "giver" when seemed ready for its rite of passage. Typically, Chumash restrictions on diet and sex would be observed by individuals before ingestion.

The effects of datura often would consist of up to a day of incapacitation, the length of which was viewed to indicate the spiritual strength of the individual. Hallucinations or dreams of animals such as hawks or coyotes were viewed as marks of a successful datura experience. The effects of datura, however, vary greatly by dosage, and current understanding indicates lasting adverse physiological effects from days or even months after ingestion.

The most significant side-effect of datura can be death, as the lethal dose of the drug is slightly more than the necessary dose to produce hallucinations. Deaths from datura in Chumash communities were often seen as the fault of the drinker, who was assumed to have deviated from the necessary dietary or sexual restrictions, or have chosen to not come back from the experience. For this reason, the use of datura has been criticized as being too dangerous, especially as its use is often begun in adolescence.

== See also ==
- Pharmacognosy
