= Turpentine weed =

Turpentine weed is a common name for several plants and may refer to:

- Gutierrezia sarothrae
- Silphium perfoliatum, native to eastern and central North America
- Silphium terebinthinaceum
- Trichostema lanceolatum, native to western North America
- Trichostema laxum
