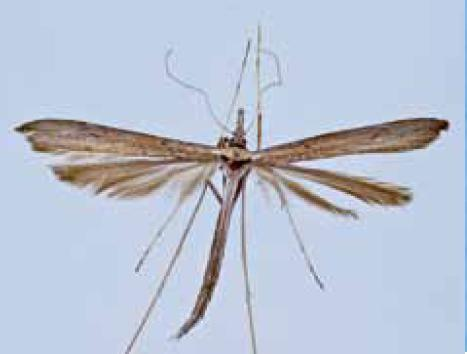

Scientific classification
- Kingdom: Animalia
- Phylum: Arthropoda
- Class: Insecta
- Order: Lepidoptera
- Family: Pterophoridae
- Genus: Hellinsia
- Species: H. longifrons

Binomial name
- Hellinsia longifrons (Walsingham, 1915)

Synonyms
- Pterophorus longifrons Walsingham, 1915; Stenoptilia philocremna Meyrick, 1930; Stenoptilia philocremma; Oidaematophorus longifrons

= Hellinsia longifrons =

Species of plume moth

Hellinsia longifrons is a moth of the family Pterophoridae. It is found in Mexico, Texas, Arizona and California.

The wingspan is 25–28 mm. The head is clothed with white tipped grey scales. The antennae are whitish. The thorax is anteriorly clothed with white tipped, very pale greyish scales, posteriorly with a heavy Y-shaped mark outlined in white, the intermediate space is grey-brown. The abdomen is brownish grey with the white margins of the Y continued as a broad whitish dorsal stripe containing three grey brown lines, the central one with blackish dots in the posterior margins of the segments. The forewings are greyish on the costa, becoming brownish on the inner margin, with scattered black and a few white scales. Continuing from the pale front part of the thorax there is a whitish basal streak. The hindwings and all fringes are grey-brown. Adults are on wing in July and September.

The larvae feed on Acourtia microcephala.
