= C. radicans =

C. radicans may refer to:

- Campsis radicans, the trumpet vine or trumpet creeper, a plant species
- Cucurbita radicans, the Calabacilla or Calabaza de Coyote, a plant species found growing wild, but also cultivated, in southern Mexico
