= Potentilla cuneata =

Potentilla cuneata may refer to two different species of plants:

- Potentilla cuneata (Lindl.) Baill. ex Munz & I.M.Johnst., a taxonomic synonym for wedgeleaf horkelia (Potentilla lindleyi)
- Potentilla cuneata Wall. ex Lehm., a taxonomic synonym for cuneate cinquefoil (Sibbaldia cuneata)
