= Buffalo gourd oil =

Seed oil extracted from the seeds of the Cucurbita foetidissima

Buffalo gourd oil is a seed oil, extracted from the seeds of the Cucurbita foetidissima, which is native to southwest North America. As the Latin name of the plant indicates, the vine has a foul smell. The seeds of the Buffalo gourd are rich in oil and protein. The oil's fatty acid composition is dominated by linoleic acid (64.5%) and oleic acid (17.1%). It has been used by American Indians to make soap.
