= Deep ocean water =

Cold, salty water deep below the surface of Earth's oceans

Deep ocean water (DOW) is the name for cold, salty water found in the deep sea, starting at 200 m (660 ft) below the surface of Earth's oceans. Ocean water differs in temperature and salinity. Warm surface water is generally saltier than the cooler deep or polar waters; in polar regions, the upper layers of ocean water are cold and fresh. Deep ocean water makes up about 90% of the volume of the oceans. Deep ocean water has a very uniform temperature, around 0–3 °C (32–37 °F), and a salinity of about 3.5% or, as oceanographers state, 35‰ (parts per thousand).

In specialized locations, such as the Natural Energy Laboratory of Hawaii, ocean water is pumped to the surface from approximately 900 m (3,000 ft) deep for applications in research, commercial and pre-commercial activities. DOW is typically used to describe ocean water at sub-thermal depths sufficient to provide a measurable difference in water temperature.

== Cold-bed agriculture ==
A potential indirect use of cold ocean water is "cold-bed agriculture". During condensation or ocean thermal energy conversion operations, the water does not reach ambient temperature, because a certain temperature gradient is required to make these processes viable. The water leaving those operations is therefore still colder than the surroundings, and a further benefit can be extracted by passing this water through underground pipes, thereby cooling agricultural soil. This reduces evaporation, and even causes water to condense from the atmosphere. This allows agricultural production where crops would normally not be able to grow. This technique is sometimes referred to as "cold agriculture" or "cold-bed agriculture".

== See also ==
- Deep sea fish
- Deep ocean minerals
