= Cucurbita pedatifolia =

- Pubescent vine of Cucurbita pedatifolia showing a forming fruit with ridges and a semi rough texture

Conservation status
- Data Deficient (IUCN 3.1)

Scientific classification
- Kingdom: Plantae
- Clade: Tracheophytes
- Clade: Angiosperms
- Clade: Eudicots
- Clade: Rosids
- Order: Cucurbitales
- Family: Cucurbitaceae
- Genus: Cucurbita
- Species: C. pedatifolia

Binomial name
- Cucurbita pedatifolia L.H.Bailey

Synonyms
- Cucurbita moorei L.H.Bailey

Species of flowering plant

Cucurbita pedatifolia is a xerophyte plant species of the genus Cucurbita. It is native to Querétaro, Mexico. It has not been domesticated. While C. pedatifolia has been cross bred, results have met with limited success. It does not cross well with other species of Cucurbita. It is a close relative of Cucurbita radicans. Geographic location and genetics make it highly likely that Cucurbita scabridifolia is a naturally occurring hybrid of Cucurbita foetidissima and C. pedatifolia. It also has some mesophyte traits may represent a transitional state between the mesophytic Cucurbita and the xerophytic Cucurbita.

The species was formally described by Liberty Hyde Bailey in 1943, in Gentes Herbarum. Cucurbita moorei was at one time described as a separate species native to the vicinity of Ixmiquilpan, Mexico within Cucurbita, but now is considered a synonym for C. pedatifolia.

Cucurbita pedatifolia was first formally described by Liberty Hyde Bailey in 1948, in Gentes Herbarum.
