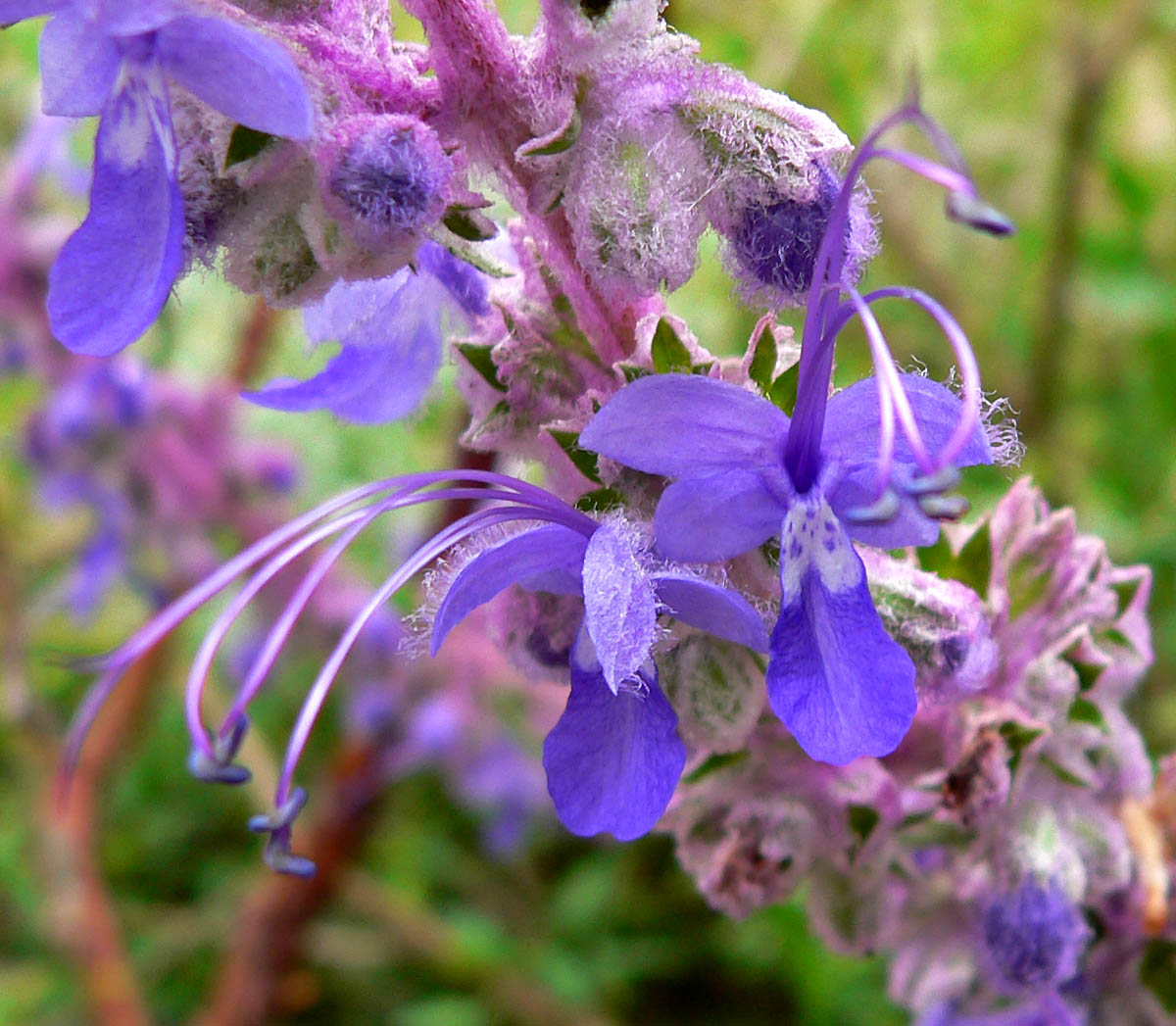

Conservation status
- Apparently Secure (NatureServe)

Scientific classification
- Kingdom: Plantae
- Clade: Tracheophytes
- Clade: Angiosperms
- Clade: Eudicots
- Clade: Asterids
- Order: Lamiales
- Family: Lamiaceae
- Genus: Trichostema
- Species: T. lanatum

Binomial name
- Trichostema lanatum Benth.

= Trichostema lanatum =

Species of shrub

Trichostema lanatum, also known as woolly bluecurls, is a small evergreen shrub or sub-shrub native to arid coastal chaparral regions of California down to the northern tip of Baja California, Mexico.

== Description ==
Trichostema lanatum is many-branched and grows to 1.5 m (5 ft) tall, with narrow, pointed green leaves. The smooth-petaled blue flowers are borne in dense clusters, with the stem and calyces covered in woolly hairs of blue, pink, or white. Flowers are present from March to June.

Spanish explorers in California called the plant romero, the Spanish term for rosemary, and that common name is still sometimes used in Mexico.

== Uses ==
Trichostema lanatum is cultivated as an ornamental plant, and several cultivars have been developed. It attracts hummingbirds and bumblebees.

Native Americans used it for a variety of medicinal and other purposes.

Its leaves and flowers make a flavorful tea.

=== Indigenous medicinal use ===
Trichostema lanatum was incorporated by the Chumash to help facilitate the healing process of menstruation and birth, as well as a general disinfectant and treatment for rheumatism. When tested against an E.Coli ▵tolC mutant, the plant exhibited anti-bacterial properties. Studies have also shown anti-inflammatory properties against pro-inflammatory cytokine TNF-ɑ and anti-bacterial properties against macrophages and gram-postivie bacteria.

This species and Trichostema lanceolatum, a related species, were both also used by other California Indigenous tribes in the form of tea or crushed leaves to treat a range of ailments including common colds, body aches, skin disorders, digestive problems, and malaria. The two species differ in smell, anatomy, and location found. Indigenous tribes used T. lanatum to treat the same ailments as T. lanceolatum. Woolly bluecurls and other native plants have historically been used by Indigenous peoples in a holistic approach to medical care, which typically considers patient health and well-being at the intersection of biology, psychology, and culture, and manipulating the biochemical properties of native plants to treat the ailment.

Future studies of woolly bluecurls and other plants used by Indigenous peoples for medicinal purposes will need to focus on the use of such plants in a broader cultural system of care. Such work can be challenging, given the historical, systematic erasure of Indigenous wisdom that has been a primary function of settler colonialism.
