= Cucurbita scabridifolia =

Scientific classification
- Kingdom: Plantae
- Clade: Tracheophytes
- Clade: Angiosperms
- Clade: Eudicots
- Clade: Rosids
- Order: Cucurbitales
- Family: Cucurbitaceae
- Genus: Cucurbita
- Species: C. scabridifolia

Binomial name
- Cucurbita scabridifolia L.H.Bailey

Species of flowering plant

Cucurbita scabridifolia is a plant species of the genus Cucurbita native to Mexico. It is a xerophyte and has not been domesticated. Very little is known about this species. Geographic location and genetics make it highly likely that C. scabridifolia is a naturally occurring hybrid of C. foetidissima and C. pedatifolia.

The species was formally described by Liberty Hyde Bailey in 1943, in Gentes Herbarum.
