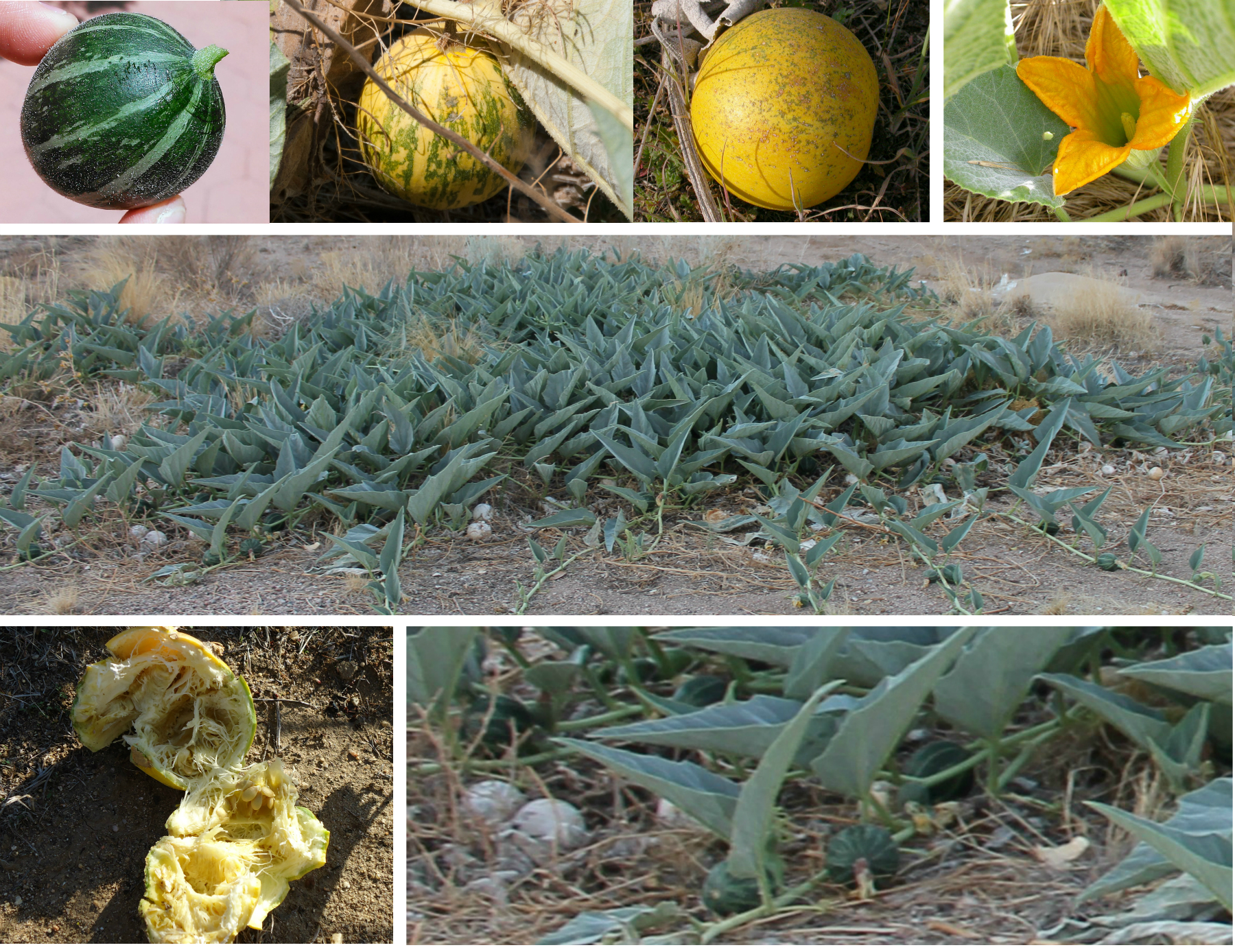
- Buffalo gourd plant, male flower and fruits.

Conservation status
- Least Concern (IUCN 3.1)

- Secure (NatureServe)

Scientific classification
- Kingdom: Plantae
- Clade: Tracheophytes
- Clade: Angiosperms
- Clade: Eudicots
- Clade: Rosids
- Order: Cucurbitales
- Family: Cucurbitaceae
- Genus: Cucurbita
- Species: C. foetidissima

Binomial name
- Cucurbita foetidissima Kunth

Synonyms
- Cucumis foetidissimus Hemsl. (1880); Cucumis perennis E.James (1823); Cucurbita perennis (E.James) A.Gray (1850); Ozodycus perennis (E.James) Raf. (1832); Pepo foetidissimus (Kunth) Britton (1913)

= Cucurbita foetidissima =

North American species of gourd

Cucurbita foetidissima is a tuberous xerophytic plant found in the central and southwestern United States and northern Mexico. It has numerous common names, but is most commonly called the buffalo gourd in English. The type specimen was collected from Mexico by Alexander von Humboldt and Aimé Bonpland sometime before 1817. In Latin, foetidissima means most unpleasant smell.

The buffalo gourd has evolved in the semiarid regions and is well-adapted to desert environments. It contains high amounts of protein and carbohydrates and yields abundant oil. The carbohydrates that are formed in the tap root have led to the idea of growing the plant for biofuel.

The fruit is consumed by both humans and animals. When mature, a stage marked by increasing desiccation of vine, leaves, fruit-stem, and fruit, the fruit begins its final gourd stage.

Geographic location and genetics make it highly likely that Cucurbita scabridifolia originated as a naturally occurring hybrid of C. foetidissima and Cucurbita pedatifolia.

== Morphology and cultivation ==
Cucurbita foetidissima requires little water and grows best in semiarid and arid environments. Warm weather is required during the five- to eight-month vegetation period. This perennial is well adapted to marginal agricultural lands such as sandy loam soils which have to be well-drained. Germination temperature range is between 15 °C and 37 °C with an optimum at 25 °C.

The maximum depth for a successful germination is 12 cm. The germination is possible in a pH range from 2.2 (germination rate 15%) up to pH 8 (germination rate 90%). Asexual propagation is possible from nodal roots.

The leaves of the buffalo gourd are typically entire and heart-shaped with a base of 10–13 cm (4–5 in) and length of 20–25 cm (8–10 in). The flowers are borne singly at the nodes of the vines after a certain amount of annual vegetative growth has taken place.

The fruit has a diameter of 7–10 cm (3–4 in). The fruit weighs 120 g to 150 g, with 292 to 315 seeds per fruit. The seeds, which are 12 mm (0.5 in) long and 7 mm (0.3 in) wide, weigh about 4 g per 100 seeds, with the seed coat accounting for about 30% of the seed weight. The seeds often remain viable for months or even years within an undamaged gourd. One hectare of plants can produce 2.5 tons of seed.

The plant forms a fleshy tap root that is used as a storage and overwintering structure. The central tap root can weigh up to 72 kg (159 lb). A four-year-old root grown under cultivation can reach a fresh weight of 45 kg (99 lb) and a length of 2.5 m (8.2 ft).

== Taxonomy ==
Cucurbita foetidissima was scientifically described and named by the botanist Carl Sigismund Kunth in 1817.

=== Names ===
Common Names for Cucurbita foetidissima
Language of Origin	Common name
English	buffalo gourd,
Spanish	calabazilla
Spanish	chilicote
English	coyote gourd
English	prairie gourd
English	fetid gourd
English	fetid wild pumpkin
English	Missouri gourd
English	stinking gourd
English	wild gourd
English	wild pumpkin

== Distribution ==
Cucurbita foetidissima is native to North America. It is found in the central and southwestern United States, in: Arizona, Arkansas, southern California, Colorado, Kansas, Missouri, southern Nebraska, southern Nevada, New Mexico, Oklahoma, Texas, and southern Utah. In Mexico, it can be found in Aguascalientes, Chihuahua, Coahuila, Guanajuato, Guerrero, Hidalgo; northern Jalisco, Mexico; Nuevo León, Querétaro, San Luis Potosí, Sonora, Tamaulipas, and Zacatecas.

== Uses ==
The buffalo gourd has the potential of being a crop adapted to arid to semiarid lands. It is also used as a durable groundcover for hiding and protecting banks from erosion.

=== Food ===
The fresh young gourd can be eaten like squash. The mature fruit is no longer edible, due to bitter compounds. Seeds may be eaten after being prepared by roasting or boiling.

The extractable oil content in whole seeds reaches from 24.3% to 50%. Linoleic acid, an essential polyunsaturated fatty acid, comprises 38% to 65% of the oil. A characterization of the oils from buffalo gourd indicates that this oil is similar to other common edible oils. Whole buffalo gourd seeds contain approximately 31% crude protein, which is usable for human consumption and for feed.

Starches are mainly located in the tap root, which forms after the first year of growth. The starch content in the dried root is between 47.5% and 56%. Fresh leaves or the whole plants can be used as animal food.

=== Traditional use ===
The Zuni people use a medicinal poultice of powdered seeds, flowers and saliva for swellings.

C. foetidissima contains a saponin that can be obtained from the fruit and root. In the Cahuilla Native American culture, the fruit and other parts of the plant have been used for their saponin content as laundry soap by rubbing plant parts against dirty clothing. However, prolonged contact can cause skin irritation.

=== Industrial use ===
Besides food, the protein can be used for industrial purposes (water paints, paper coating, adhesives and textile sizing). Biodiesel can be produced from the oil in the seeds. But the main interest to produce renewable fuels is to produce biofuel with the carbohydrates which are located in the tap root.

== Pests ==
Various insects may penetrate the hard skin of the gourd. External structures appear to prevent damage by most insects and the plant is highly resistant to cucumber beetle and squash bug. White molds seem to result in smooth surface areas and black molds often form circular patterns.

== Gallery ==
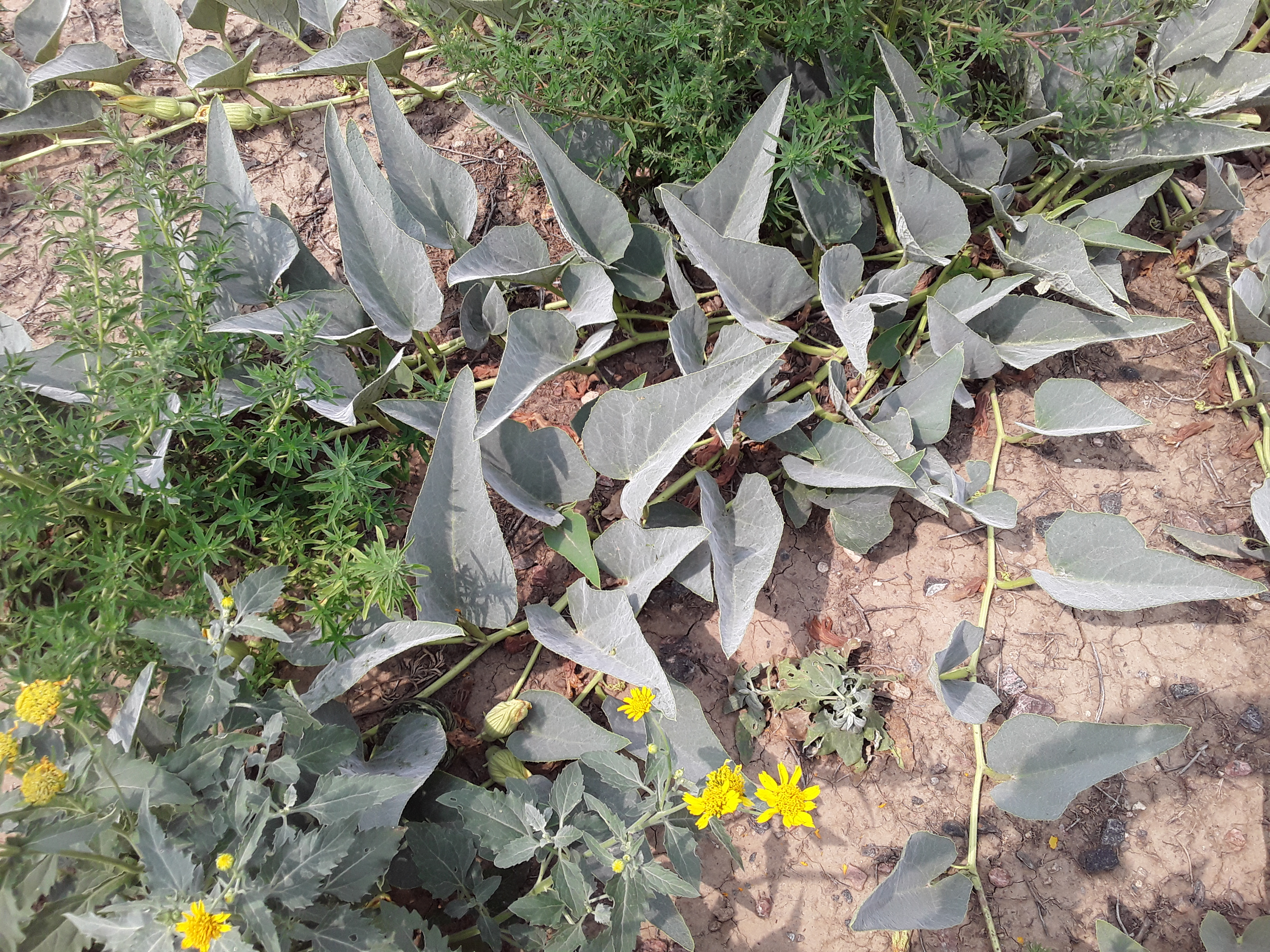
Cucurbita foetidissima in Aurora, Colorado

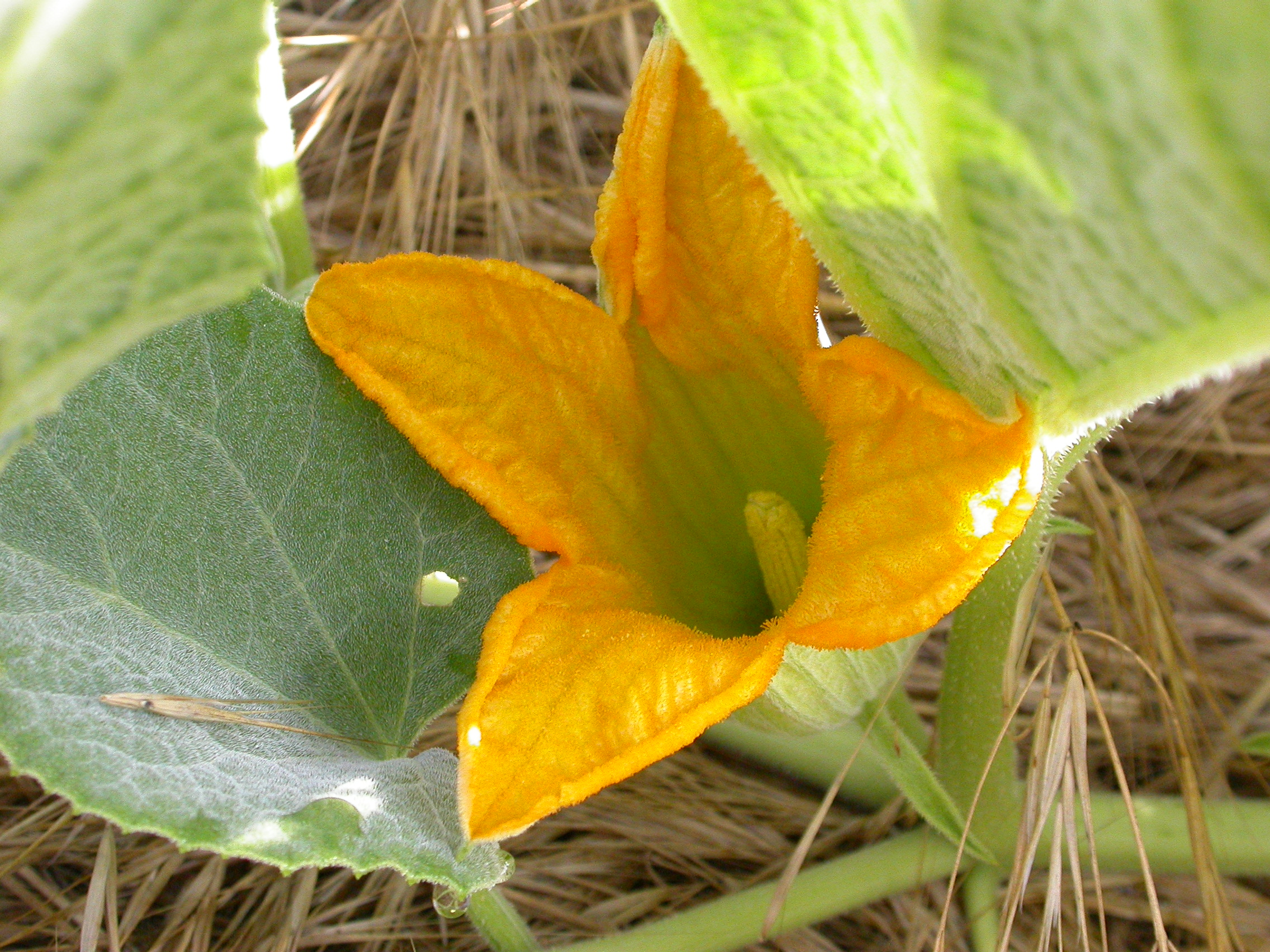
Staminate (male) flower, Pomona, California

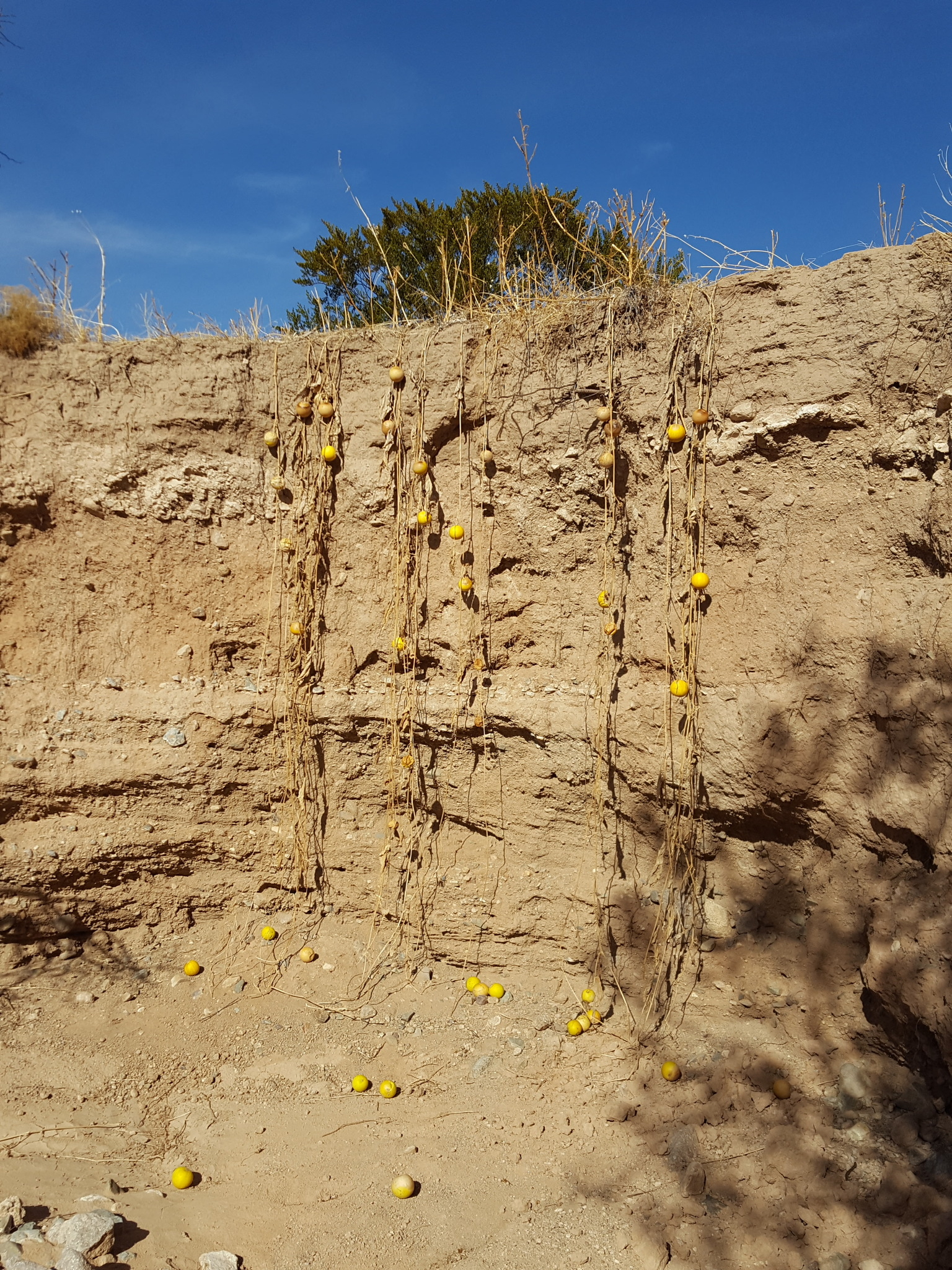
Vines with fruits hanging over a cliff

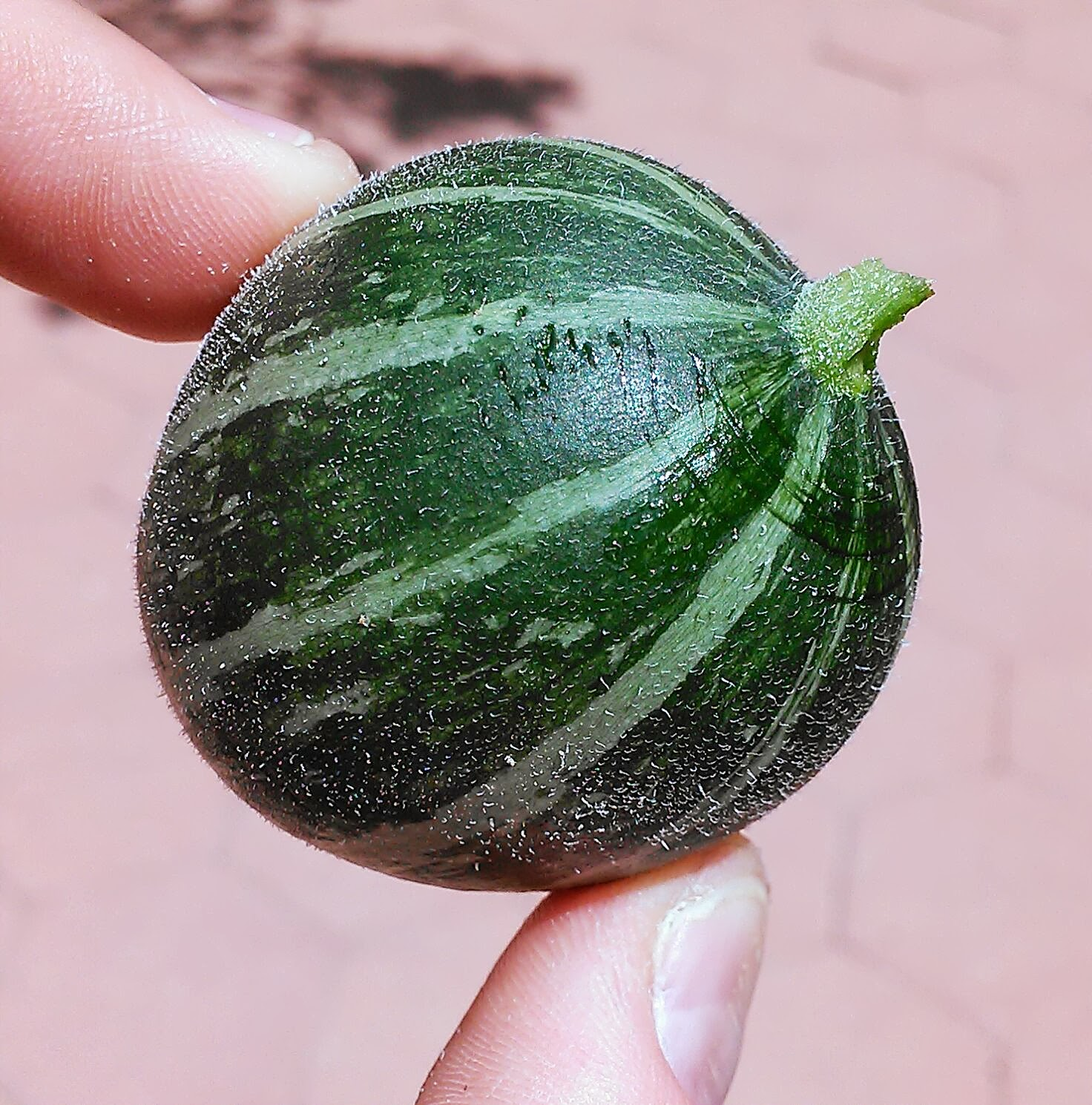
Immature buffalo gourd, close up photo, Albuquerque, New Mexico

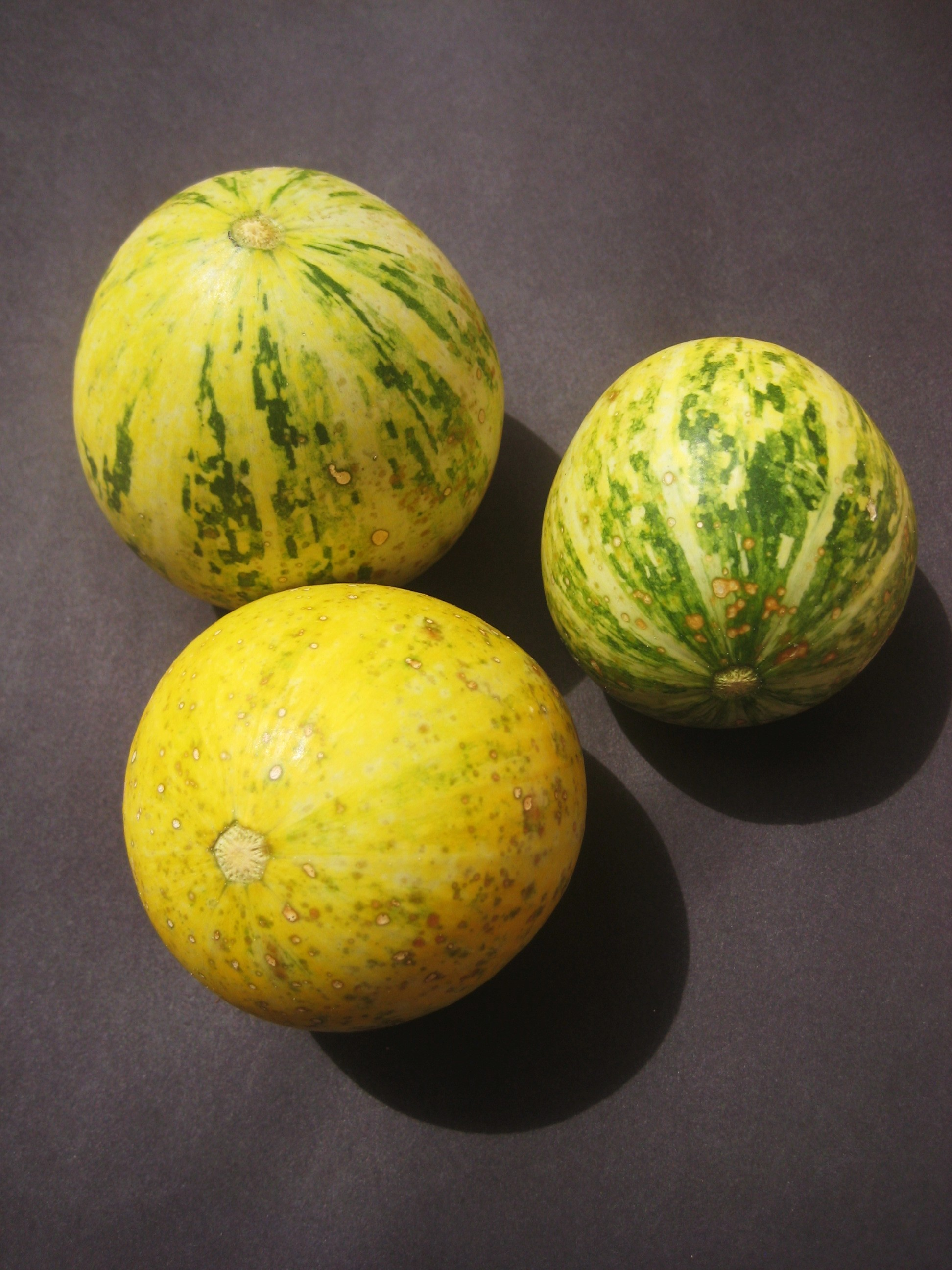
Mature fruit, Austin, Texas

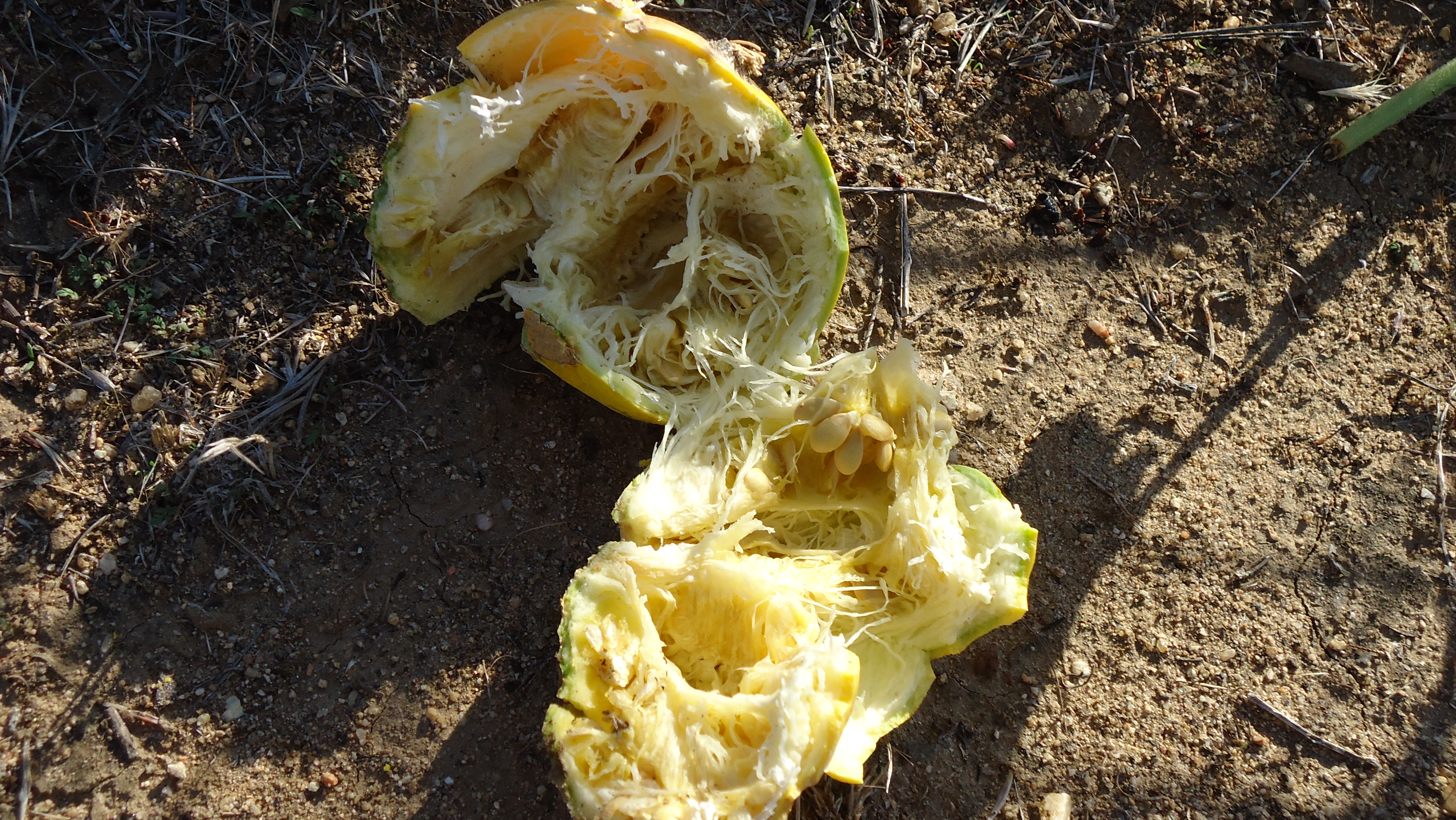
Interior view, Newport Beach Back Bay, California

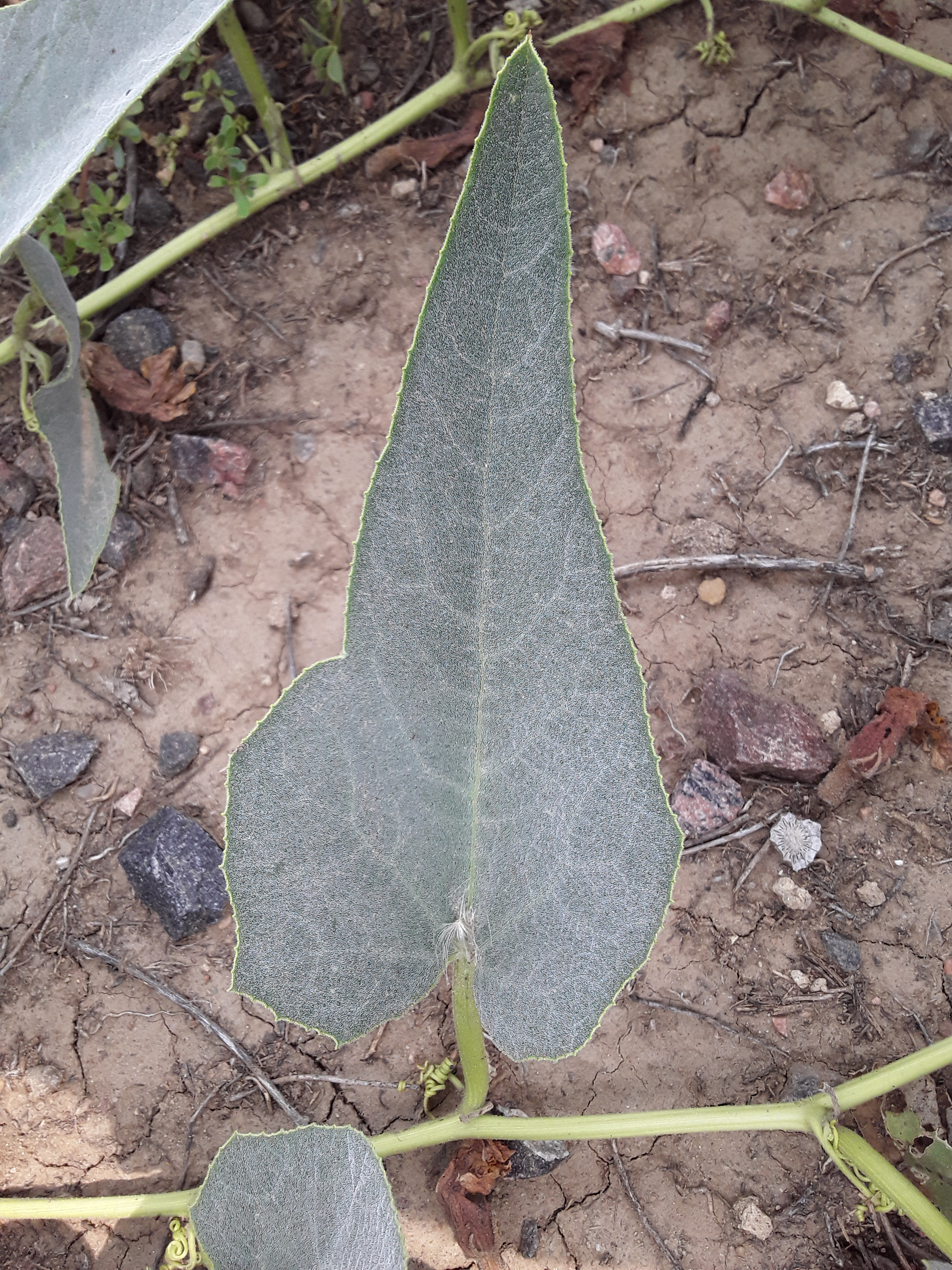
Leaf of C. foetidissima in Aurora, Colorado
