= Cucurbita radicans =

Conservation status
- Endangered (IUCN 3.1)

Scientific classification
- Kingdom: Plantae
- Clade: Embryophytes
- Clade: Tracheophytes
- Clade: Spermatophytes
- Clade: Angiosperms
- Clade: Eudicots
- Clade: Rosids
- Order: Cucurbitales
- Family: Cucurbitaceae
- Genus: Cucurbita
- Species: C. radicans

Binomial name
- Cucurbita radicans Naudin

Synonyms
- Cucurbita gracilior L.H.Bailey

Species of flowering plant

Cucurbita radicans, commonly known in Mexico as calabacilla (little pumpkin/gourd) or calabaza de coyote (coyote gourd), is a species of gourd found growing wild, but also cultivated, in southern Mexico (specifically in the Federal Districts of Jalisco, Mexico and Michoacán). The type specimen was collected growing in rocks below a mountain near Guadalupe in the vicinity of Mexico City (the exact location is unclear); other specimens were also ubiquitous in the area; in corn fields and gardens, either being cultivated, or as invaders. It is a close relative of Cucurbita pedatifolia.
