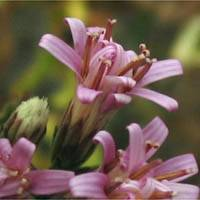

Conservation status
- Vulnerable (NatureServe)

Scientific classification
- Kingdom: Plantae
- Clade: Tracheophytes
- Clade: Angiosperms
- Clade: Eudicots
- Clade: Asterids
- Order: Asterales
- Family: Asteraceae
- Genus: Acourtia
- Species: A. microcephala

Binomial name
- Acourtia microcephala DC.

Synonyms
- Perezia microcephala (DC.) A.Gray

= Acourtia microcephala =

Species of flowering plant

Acourtia microcephala is a species of flowering plant in the family Asteraceae known by the common name sacapellote. It is native to southern California and Baja California, where it grows in woodland and chaparral, especially in the coastal mountain ranges.

Acourtia microcephala is a bushy perennial herb producing several erect stems from a woody caudex up to about 1.5 metres (4 ft 11 in) in maximum height. The stems branch toward the ends and are densely foliated in toothed, wavy-edged, glandular leaves 2 to 15 centimetres (0.79 to 5.91 in) long. The stems and leaves are sticky with exudate. The inflorescences contain clusters of many flower heads, each cylindrical head wrapped in long, flat glandular phyllaries. The flower heads are discoid, containing only disc florets and no ray florets. Each disc floret has two lips, the outer of which is long, flat, and usually bright pink, and easily mistaken for a ligule. The fruit is a glandular achene a few millimetres long which has a pappus of bristles up to a centimetre in length.

== Uses ==
=== Traditional medicine ===
This plant had a traditional medicinal use as a laxative. Cahuilla people took decoctions of the plants as a treatment for constipation. Californios adopted the use of the plant as a herbal remedy from indigenous Californians, using decoctions as a diuretic to treat kidney and bladder problems.

In Chumash medicine, sacapellote roots were boiled into a decoction which was drunk to treat severe or chronic coughs, lung congestion, asthma and other pulmonary ailments; this remedy was recorded to have been used by Chumash people into the 1950s. The root decoction was also reportedly applied externally onto sores.
