= Deep ocean minerals =

Deep ocean minerals are mineral nutrients (chemical elements) extracted from deep ocean water found at ocean depths between 250 and 1500 meters. Deep ocean water contains over 70 mineral nutrients and trace trace elements, including magnesium, calcium, and potassium in their bio ionic form. To extract these products, deep ocean water is treated with microfiltration and reverse osmosis to desalinate and concentrate magnesium, other minerals, and trace elements whilst eliminating the salt.

Although research about deep ocean minerals is in its early stages, they are a source of electrolytes that can help to metabolize carbohydrates, proteins, and fat and maintain bone, teeth, and muscle function. Some other health benefits are also possible.

The abundance of minerals and trace elements is also of importance, as deficiencies in macro minerals and micronutrients can lead to premature aging, immune dysfunction, and susceptibility to cardiovascular-related diseases.

The minerals and trace elements present in deep ocean water have three important functions:

1. Provide the structure to our organs, tissues, and bones – calcium, phosphorus, magnesium, fluorine, and sulfur.
2. The electrolyte form facilitates body fluid activity in tissues to maintain fluid balance, acid-base balance, membrane permeability, and tissue irritability (including nerve transmission and muscle contraction) - sodium, potassium, chloride, calcium, and magnesium in blood, all are present in deep ocean minerals.
3. Magnesium alone potentially catalyzes up to 600 enzyme and hormone reactions within the body.

== Seawater and holistic nutrition ==
Seawater has a long history of therapeutic use, referred to as "thalassotherapy". Both Greeks and Romans used the therapeutic effects of seawater for relaxation, regeneration, and stimulation.

In 1897, René Quinton published the first comprehensive scientific thesis advocating the medical use of seawater in his book, Seawater Organic Matrix, 1904. He discovered the similarity between the nutrient profile in microalgae ocean water and our blood nutrient profile. He noted that the ratios of minerals in both fluids were similar, with the exception of sodium chloride, which he adjusted. Quinton selected seawater from regions that also contained microalgae.

== Ocean water profile ==
Ocean water can be characterized into three categories - surface sea water, deep ocean water, and very deep ocean water. Each layer remains separate and autonomous from the others, moving at different speeds and directions from different kinetic forces and having different temperatures, densities, and life-form statuses.

The surface seawater layer is influenced by sunlight penetration and circulates rapidly in unison with the seasons and wind patterns to a depth of 250 meters. It supports micro and animal life.

The middle layer is deep ocean water, where the water is free of sunlight and life forms. It is characterized not only by its mineral density but cold temperature, cleanliness, and trace elements. Deep ocean water is present at depths of between 250 and 1500 meters. This deep ocean current moves very slowly under the influence of density and temperature gradients. The high mineral density is attributed to the depth-related pressure and the change in temperature from 20 °C+ at the surface to 8 °C at 600 meters depth generates the movement of this layer.

Very deep ocean water has been discovered in a number of troughs in the Atlantic and Pacific Oceans. Depths can range from 1500 meters to 15 kilometers and life forms are supported where volcanic processes bring heat and minerals to the seabed floor.

Deep ocean mineral creation begins when the summer ice melts from both Greenland and the Sub-Arctic region. The melting water collects minerals and trace elements during its journey to the ocean.

The minerals make the water heavier, so the water naturally sinks to the ocean floor where it commences a 2000-year journey. It flows southwards down the Atlantic Ocean, moves around the African Cape, and then inches north through the Indian Ocean and also into the western Pacific Ocean, first coming close to land in Taiwan, then Okinawa and Hawaii. Here it starts arching back south, towards the Antarctica where the changing seawater temperatures from the summer sun force the deep ocean water to the surface to feed the largest micro and macro food chain on our planet.

The east coast of Taiwan is directly adjacent to one of the largest reservoirs of accessible deep ocean water. The southern islands of Japan and Hawaii also have land access to deep ocean water.

Taiwan's east coast is ideally located to siphon deep ocean water directly to the surface from the coast. It is then micro-filtered, followed by reverse osmosis to desalinate and concentrate the magnesium and other minerals and trace elements at the expense of sodium chloride.

== Research ==
Over the past 15 years, there have been over 40 new publications establishing deep ocean minerals as statistically significant with regard to improved cardiovascular and metabolic function. Recent clinical research from Taiwan, Japan, and Korea also shows statistically significant therapeutic health benefits from either topical or oral consumption of deep ocean minerals.

In 2009, scientists at the National Taiwan Ocean University published the first notable Wistar rat treadmill fatigue study. Researchers used desalinated deep ocean water processed with ultra-filtration and reverse osmosis to increase magnesium levels and hardness. The water was sourced from the east coast of Taiwan. The study showed that the deep ocean mineral experimental groups were significantly better than the control group with regard to exhausting time and the ratio of lactic acid elimination to lactic acid increment. Summarizing the results, the researchers suggested that endurance, adaptation to exercising load and accelerating the elimination of fatigue in rats could be improved when fed with deep ocean minerals of higher hardness and quantity.

In 2014, scientists at Hungkuang University published a gerbil animal trial, endorsing the findings of the Wistar rat trial and again demonstrating that profiled deep ocean water significantly improved exercise performance in gerbils subjected to treadmill exercise.

In 2013, researchers at the Department of Sports Sciences, Taipei University conducted a randomized double-blind placebo-controlled cross-over human study to evaluate the effect of deep ocean water on-time recovery from a fatiguing exercise conducted at 30 °C. deep ocean mineral supplementation resulted in the complete recovery of aerobic power within four hours. Muscle power was also elevated above placebo levels within 24 hours of recovery. Increased circulating creatine kinase (CK) and myoglobin, indicators of exercise-induced muscle damage, were eliminated by deep ocean minerals in parallel with attenuated oxidative damage. Researchers concluded that the results provide compelling evidence that deep ocean minerals contain soluble elements, which can increase human recovery following an exhaustive physical challenge.

Over the last 11 years, studies show the potential application of deep ocean minerals for use as a dietary therapy for the prevention and complementary treatment of cardiovascular disease. In 2003, Japanese researchers published their findings regarding the pharmacological activity of deep ocean mineral directly influencing the serum lipid values of cholesterol-fed rabbits.

In 2008, a Japanese research group used hypercholesterolemic rabbits to examine changes due to the deep ocean water diet on cardiovascular hemodynamics. Systolic, diastolic, pulse and mean arterial pressures, and total peripheral resistance were significantly lower in the deep ocean water group than in the control group.

The first human trial of deep ocean minerals was conducted in Japan in 2008 with 16 male volunteers examining the effect of bitterns standardized on magnesium in a two-way, randomized cross-over study. The healthy subjects were given a fat load test prior to measuring the effect of postprandial (after meal) hyperlipidemia. They found that magnesium supplementation reduced and delayed the postprandial serum and chylomicron TAG responses after fat loading. The data indicates that Mg supplementation may contribute to preventing the atherogenic process in healthy subjects.

In addition, a series of research papers from Taichung University was published. In 2011, mice trials confirmed similar results to the Japanese findings and concluded that electro-dialyzed deep ocean water benefited high-cholesterol dietary mice and recommended that standardized deep ocean minerals should be pursued as a dietary food ingredient for cardiovascular health. Similar results at the Taichung Medical University were also published in 2011 for hamsters.

In 2012, in Taipei, a major human trial with 42 hypercholesterolemic volunteers were randomly divided into three groups: reverse osmotic water, deep ocean minerals (Mg: 395 mg/L, hardness 1410ppm), and magnesium-chloride fortified water (Mg: 386 mg/L, hardness 1430ppm). Serum low-density lipoprotein-cholesterol (LDL-C) was also decreased by deep ocean minerals. Further, the total cholesterol levels of subjects in the deep ocean mineral group were significantly lower than those in the magnesium-chloride fortified water or reverse osmotic water groups.

In 2013, Taichung University researchers published an extended rat trial. The study indicated that deep ocean minerals decreased the systolic and diastolic pressures in spontaneously hypertensive rats in an eight-week experiment. Deep ocean minerals have been shown to reduce serum lipids and prevent atherogenesis in a hypercholesterolemic rabbit model. The results demonstrated that deep ocean water significantly suppressed serum cholesterol levels, reduced lipid accumulation in liver tissues, and limited aortic fatty streaks.

In 2014, Qingdao Ocean University published a paper showing that when deep ocean minerals were added to HepG2 cells, it decreased the lipid contents of hepatocytes through the activation of AMP-activated protein kinase, thus inhibiting the synthesis of cholesterol and fatty acid and recommended further investigation for treatment and prevention of hypolipidemic and other lifestyle-related diseases.

The research on deep ocean minerals points to a possible, positive impact on cardiovascular health. However, research findings from the Biomedical Research Institute of Kyungpook National University Hospital also extend the possible dietary use of deep ocean minerals as a treatment for metabolic syndrome. In 2008, Korean researchers reported deep ocean minerals could potentially be used as an anti-obesity agent by inhibiting adipocyte differentiation, mediated through the down-regulated expression of adipogenic transcription factors and adipocyte-specific proteins.

In 2009, the same Korean researchers published a further study on the anti-obesity and anti-diabetic effects of deep ocean minerals in obese mice. The control group received tap water and the experimental group received deep ocean minerals of hardness 1000 ppm for 84 days. The deep ocean mineral-fed group compared to the control group reported a 7% body weight decrease, reduced plasma glucose levels, and a significant increase in glucose disposal. The research suggests that the anti-diabetic and anti-obesity activities of DOM were mediated by modulating the expression of diabetes and obesity-specific molecules. Taken together, these results provide a possibility that continuous intake of deep ocean minerals can be of dietary therapeutic value for the treatment of obesity and diabetes. In 2013, further diabetes-induced mice study was conducted to establish dosage regimes. The researchers concluded that deep ocean minerals provided a novel activator for glucose uptake.
