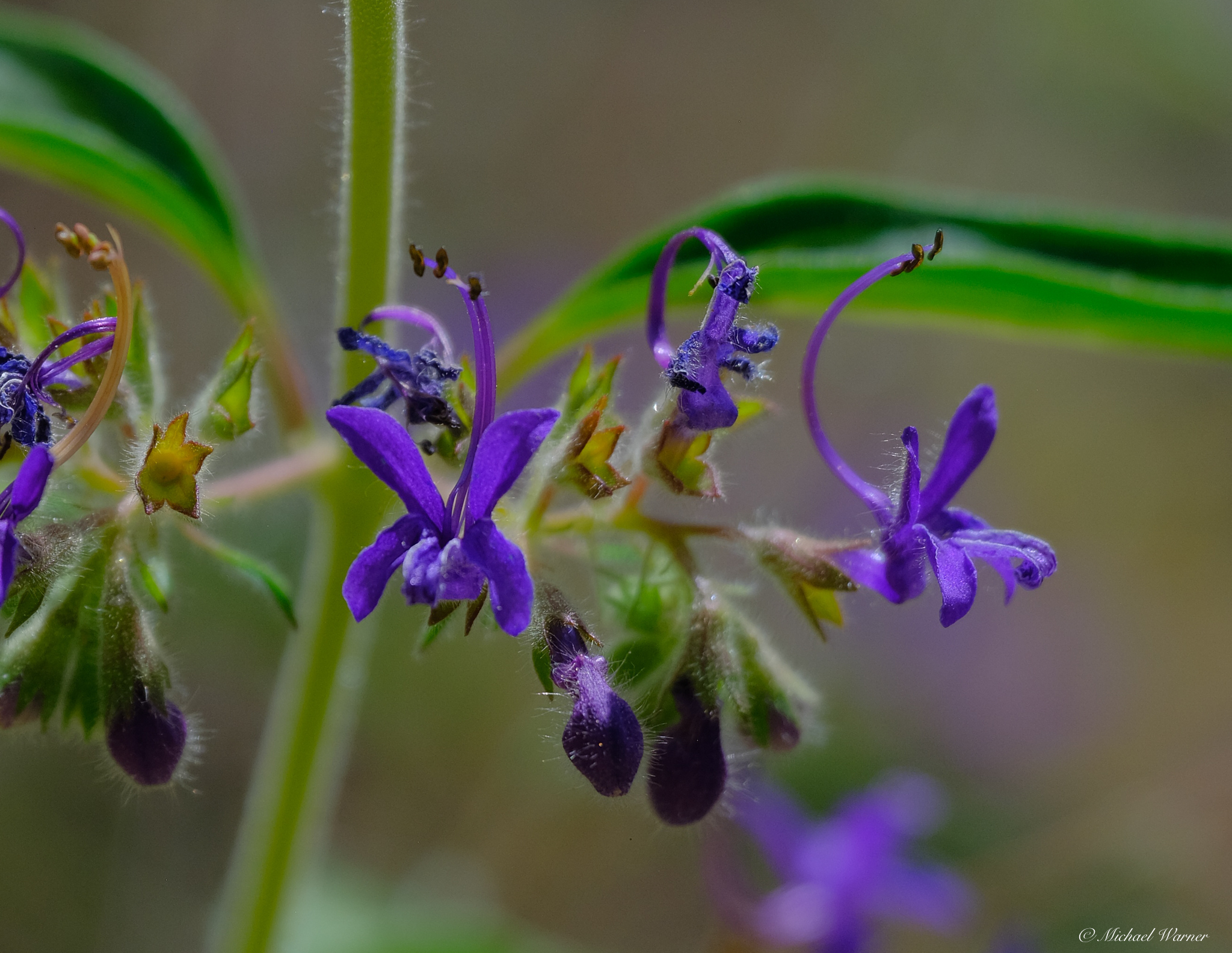

Conservation status
- Apparently Secure (NatureServe)

Scientific classification
- Kingdom: Plantae
- Clade: Tracheophytes
- Clade: Angiosperms
- Clade: Eudicots
- Clade: Asterids
- Order: Lamiales
- Family: Lamiaceae
- Genus: Trichostema
- Species: T. laxum

Binomial name
- Trichostema laxum A.Gray

= Trichostema laxum =

Species of flowering plant

Trichostema laxum is a species of flowering plant in the mint family, known by the common name turpentine weed from the foliage's scent.

== Distribution ==
The annual plant is native to northern California and Oregon, at elevations below 1,700 metres (5,600 ft). It is found primarily in the Inner Northern California Coast Ranges, including the subranges of the Klamath Mountains and the Mayacamas Mountains.

It grows in gravelly streambanks or sandy soil, of the mountains and foothills in chaparral, Foothill oak woodland, and Yellow pine forest habitats. The species has an affinity for serpentine soils.

== Description ==
Trichostema laxum is an annual herb approaching 5 decimetres (1.6 ft) in maximum height.

Its aromatic foliage, with a strong turpentine odor, is coated in glandular and nonglandular hairs. The lanceolate to narrowly ovate leaves are up to 7 centimeters long.

The inflorescence is a series of clusters of flowers located at each leaf pair. Each flower has a hairy calyx of green or reddish sepals and a tubular, lipped purple corolla. The four stamens are long and curved, measuring up to 1.6 centimeters in length.

Its bloom period is from June to October.
