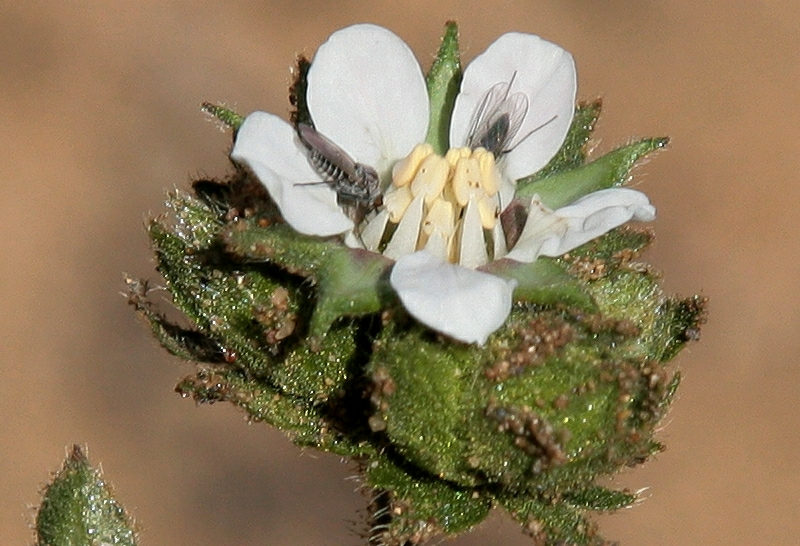

Scientific classification
- Kingdom: Plantae
- Clade: Tracheophytes
- Clade: Angiosperms
- Clade: Eudicots
- Clade: Rosids
- Order: Rosales
- Family: Rosaceae
- Genus: Potentilla
- Species: P. lindleyi

Binomial name
- Potentilla lindleyi Greene

Synonyms
- Horkelia cuneata Lindl.; Potentilla cuneata (Lindl.) Baill. ex Munz & I.M.Johnst.; Potentilla kelloggii var. cuneata (Lindl.) Hoover

= Potentilla lindleyi =

Species of flowering plant

Potentilla lindleyi, commonly known as wedgeleaf horkelia, is a species of flowering plant in the rose family. It is endemic to California, where it grows in coastal chaparral communities and sandy areas.

== Description ==
This is a matting or clumping perennial herb producing erect green or red stems up to 70 centimeters tall. The fernlike green leaves are up to 30 centimeters long and are made up of toothed, oval-shaped leaflets each one or two centimeters long. The foliage and stems are often quite hairy. The inflorescence holds several flowers, each with narrow, pointed bractlets and wider, reflexed sepals. The sepals and five white petals may be tinted with bright pink. The center of the flower holds ten stamens and up to 60 small pistils.
