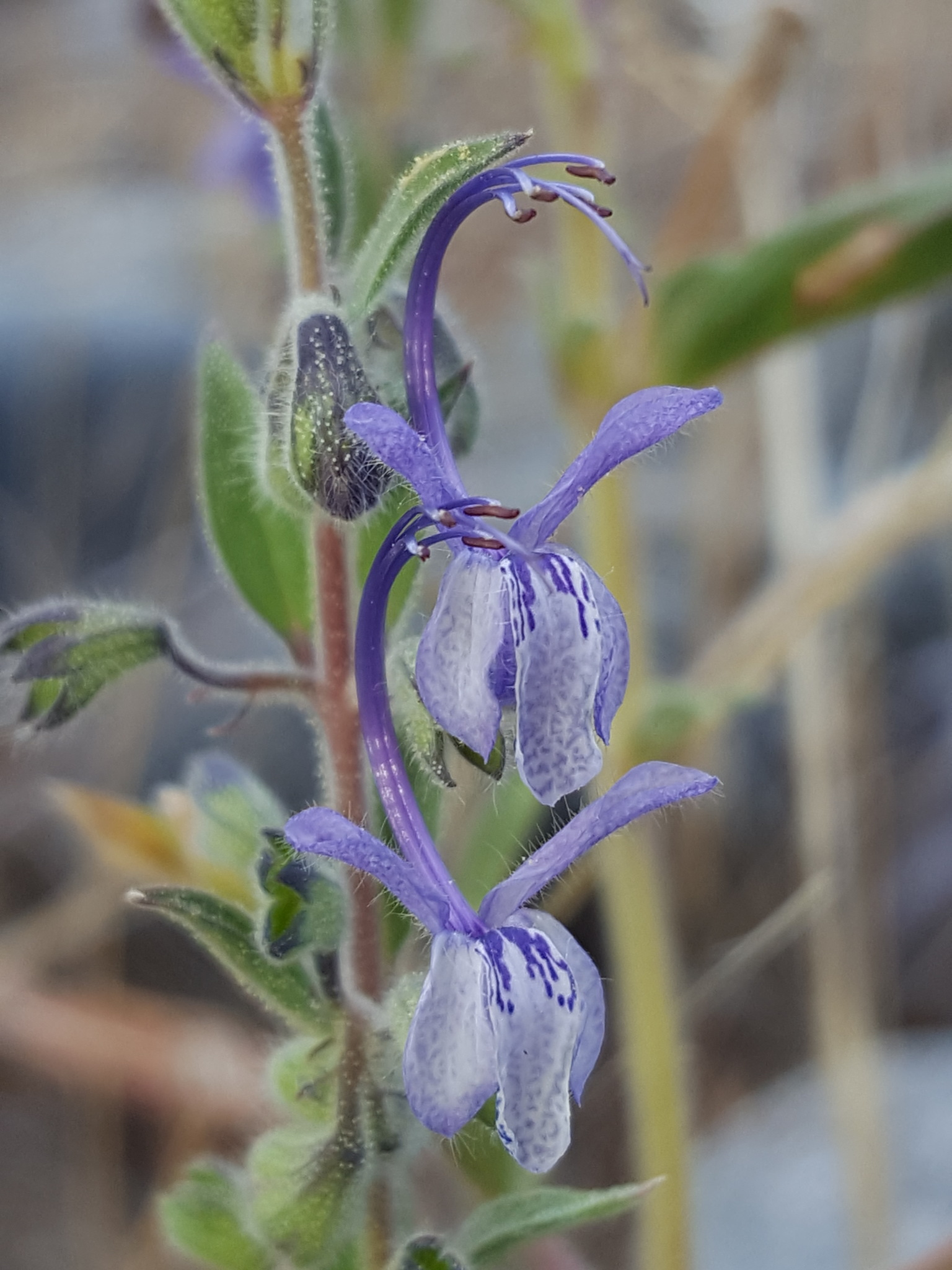

Conservation status
- Secure (NatureServe)

Scientific classification
- Kingdom: Plantae
- Clade: Tracheophytes
- Clade: Angiosperms
- Clade: Eudicots
- Clade: Asterids
- Order: Lamiales
- Family: Lamiaceae
- Genus: Trichostema
- Species: T. lanceolatum

Binomial name
- Trichostema lanceolatum Benth.

= Trichostema lanceolatum =

Species of flowering plant

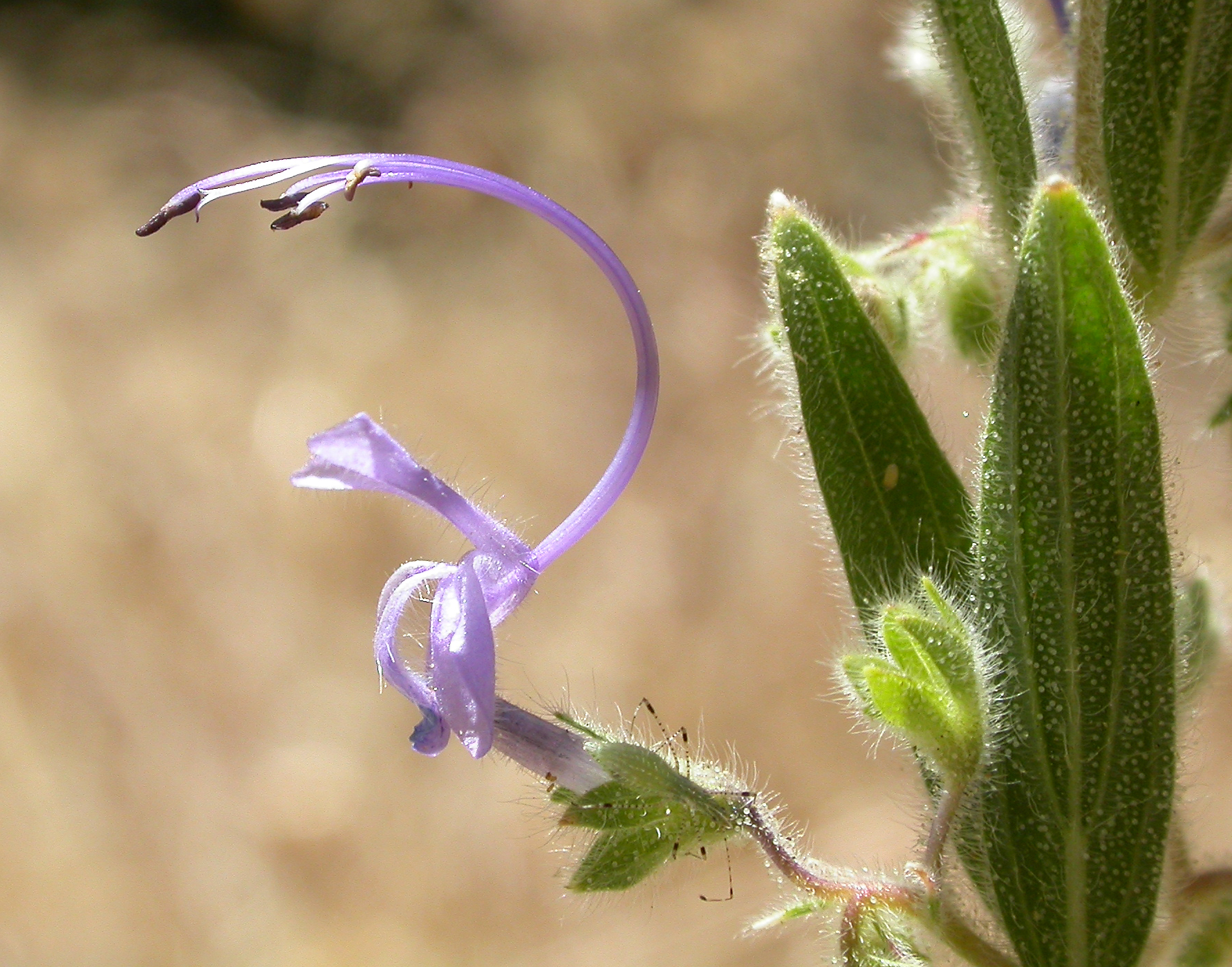
Trichostema lanceolatum closeup

Trichostema lanceolatum, with the common names vinegarweed and camphor weed, is an annual flowering herb of the mint family native to western North America.

The common name 'vinegarweed' originated due to its foliage containing volatile oils that have a strong vinegar odor. The oils have phytotoxic properties, which help the plant compete by killing or injuring other plant species.

== Distribution ==
The plant is native to the Western United States from the Pacific Coast Ranges in Washington and Oregon, through California, and to northern Baja California state in México. It is found from above sea level to 2,200 metres (7,200 ft) in elevation.

California habitats it grows in include: chaparral; coastal sage scrub; and Northern, Southern, and Foothill oak woodlands.

== Description ==
Trichostema lanceolatum is an annual herbaceous wildflower, growing under 1 metre (3.3 ft) in height.

The soft-hairy foliage has lanceolate leaves, 0.8–3 inches (2.0–7.6 cm) long. In hot weather the vinegar smell of the plant becomes intense as the oils in the tissues permeate the air.

The bilaterally symmetrical flowers, of pale blue to purple, are in long clusters in leaf axils on short green stems. The blooming period is from August to October.

Plants reproduce only by seed that are primarily dispersed by falling to the ground below the parent plant.

== Uses ==
The plant is an important a pollen source for native bees and other insects. When a pollinating insect alights on the lower lobes of the corolla, and inserts its mouth parts into the nectar-containing lower section of the same tube, the narrow corolla portion above is straightened and snaps rapidly downward brushing pollen onto the insect's back.

The volatile oils make it unpalatable to grazing and foraging animals.

=== Medical plant ===
The indigenous peoples of California used this as a traditional medicinal plant, as a cold and fever remedy, a pain reliever, and a flea insect repellent.
