= Milkfish congee =

Taiwanese congee

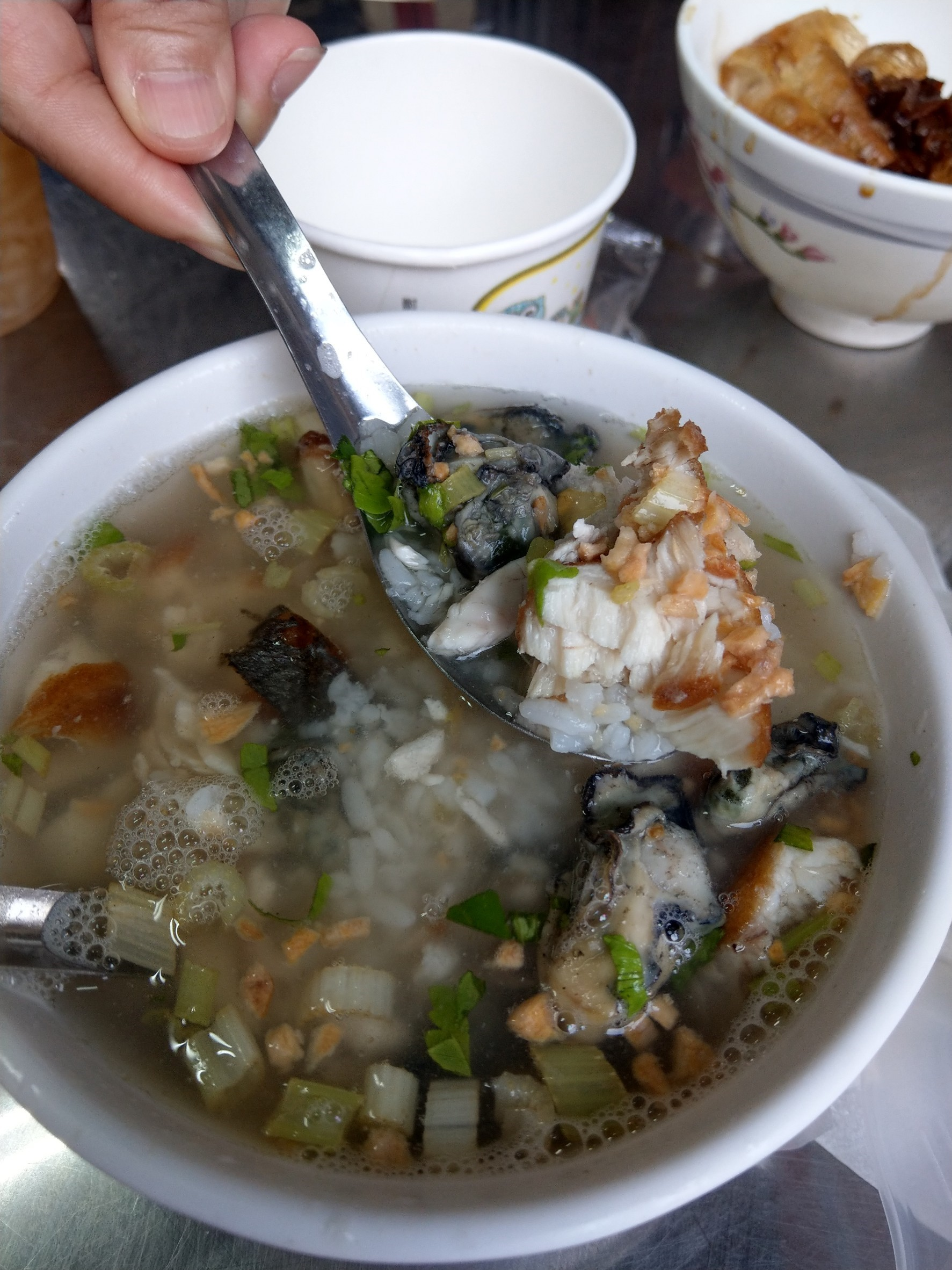
- Region or state: Tainan
- Associated cuisine: Taiwan
- Main ingredients: milkfish, rice

Milkfish congee (Chinese: 虱目魚肚粥; Tongyong Pinyin: Shīmùyúdù jhōu; Tâi-lô: sat-ba̍k-hî-tōo muê) is a Taiwanese breakfast dish consisting of a congee with milkfish belly. The dish is typically served with pepper and chopped spring onions and is often eaten at breakfast. Originating from Tainan, the dish is considered one of the national dishes of Taiwan. Recently, the dish is starting to gain popularity in the United States.

== Culinary method ==
Usually, milkfish bone is used to boil the broth, which is then used as a base for the congee. The congee soup is seasoned with pepper and chopped spring onions. One difficulty in preparing this dish is that milkfish has many tiny bones, making it hard to eat. Thus, milkfish farmers in southern Taiwan usually send them to processing plants to pick out the fish bones first, so the dish is also known as boneless milkfish belly congee.

== See also ==
- Eel noodles
- List of fish dishes
- Taiwanese cuisine
