= Piglet & Co =

Restaurant in San Francisco, California, U.S.

- Interactive map of Piglet & Co

Restaurant information
- Food type: Taiwanese
- Location: 2170 Mission Street, San Francisco, California, 94110, United States
- Coordinates: 37°45′44″N 122°25′11″W
- Website: pigletandco.com

Piglet & Co is a Taiwanese restaurant in San Francisco, California. It was named one of twelve best new restaurants in the U.S. by Eater in 2023.
