= Cuttlefish geng =

Taiwanese soup dish

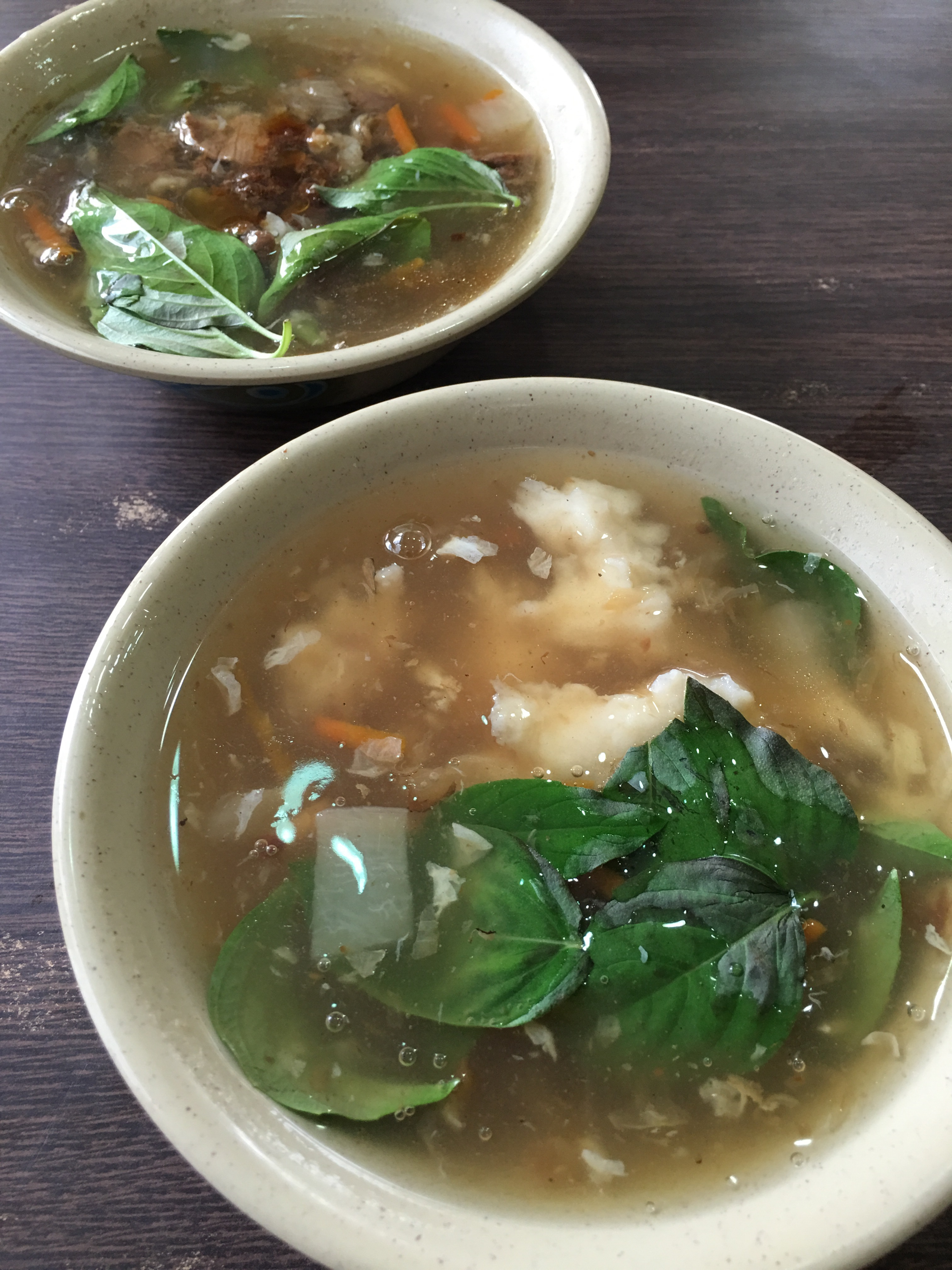
- Alternative names: hue-ki-kenn
- Region or state: Taiwan
- Associated cuisine: Taiwan
- Main ingredients: cuttlefish

Cuttlefish geng
- Traditional Chinese: 花枝羹
Transcriptions
Standard Mandarin
- Hanyu Pinyin: hūazhīgēng
Southern Min
- Hokkien POJ: hue-ki-kenn

Cuttlefish geng (Chinese: 花枝羹; pinyin: huāzhīgēng; Pe̍h-ōe-jī: hue-ki-kenn) comprise a signature Taiwanese geng soup dish that features cuttlefish as its main ingredient. The dish is popular in night markets in Taiwan. This dish is a type of Hakka soup known for its thick consistency, which is achieved by using starch such as cornstarch or potato starch.

== Culinary method ==
The preparation of cuttlefish geng involves cutting the cuttlefish into thin strips or forming them into balls coated with fish paste. These are then cooked in a thickened broth. The soup is typically enhanced with rice wine and katsuobushi. Common ingredients in the soup include bamboo shoots, carrots, wood ear mushrooms, and chopped daikon. The dish is usually served hot, with black vinegar, and seasoned with white pepper and freshly chopped basil or coriander.

== See also ==
- Taiwanese cuisine
- Geng (dish)
- Oyster vermicelli
