= Taiwanese cuisine =

Culinary traditions of Taiwan

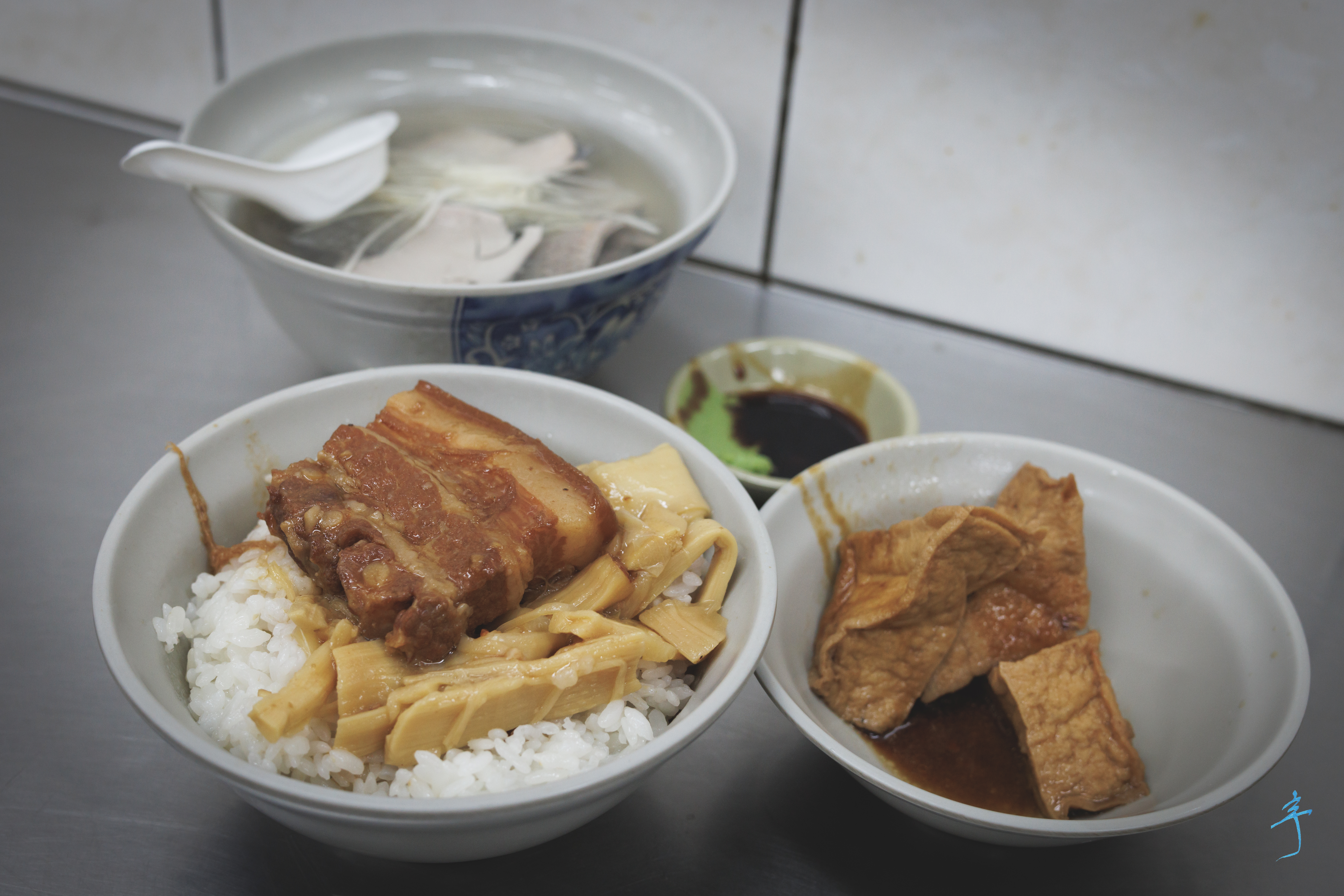
Taiwanese khòng-bah-pn̄g, tofu and milkfish skin soup

Taiwanese cuisine (Chinese: 臺灣料理; pinyin: Táiwān liàolǐ; Pe̍h-ōe-jī: Tâi-oân liāu-lí or 臺灣菜; Táiwāncài; Tâi-oân-chhài) is a popular style of food with several variations, including Chinese and that of Taiwanese indigenous peoples, with the earliest cuisines known of being the indigenous ones. With over a hundred years of historical development, southern Fujian cuisine has had the most profound impact on mainstream Taiwanese cuisine but it has also been influenced by Hakka cuisine, the cuisines of the waishengren (people of other provinces), and Japanese cuisine.

Taiwan's cuisine is tied to its history of colonization and modern politics makes the description of Taiwanese cuisine difficult. As Taiwan developed economically, fine dining became increasingly popular. Taiwanese cuisine has significant regional variations.

Night markets in Taiwan form a significant part of the food culture. Vegetarian and vegan food are very common. Taiwanese cuisine is popular around the world with some items like bubble tea and Taiwanese fried chicken becoming global phenomena.

== History ==
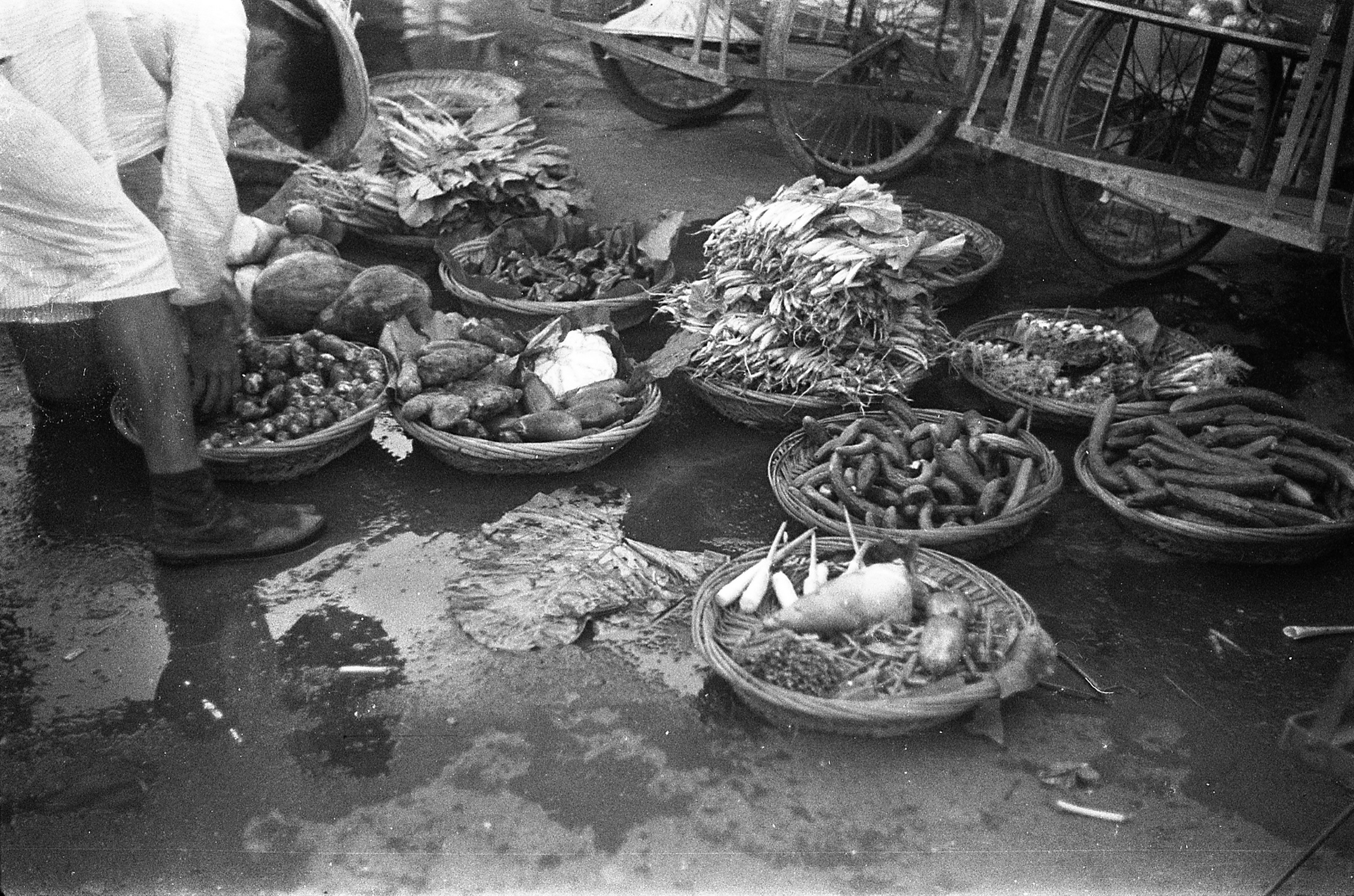
At a fruit and vegetable market in Taihoku Prefecture (now Taipei) 1938–1942.

According to Katy Hui-wen Hung, "Taiwanese food history is as murky as Taiwanese politics". This is because Taiwanese cuisine is intricately tied to patterns of migration and colonization. Local and international Taiwanese cuisine, including its history, is a politically contentious topic. Taiwan's complex and diverse identity makes Taiwanese cuisine difficult to define. Tense political relations between Taiwan and China also complicate the history.

The history of Taiwanese cuisine began with the cuisine of the aboriginal peoples of the islands of Taiwan. In the 16th century Hokkien and Hakka communities immigrated to Taiwan and brought their cuisines with them. Due to this part of its heritage Taiwanese cuisine is often considered as a part of regional Han cuisine. Early European influences came from the Dutch, Spanish, and Portuguese.

Due to the period of Japanese rule, Taiwanese cuisine was also strongly influenced by Japanese washoku and yōshoku. During Japanese rule Japanese dishes and foodways such as bento, sashimi, rice balls, and miso soup were introduced to Taiwanese cuisine.

After WWII, the Kuomintang retreat to Taiwan brought along many Han cuisines outside the province of Fujian or Southeast China. After that, the dishes from China especially Guangdong, Chaoshan, Shanghai, Sichuan and Beijing could be easily found in Taiwan.

According to Taiwanese chef Fu Pei-mei, authentic Chinese culinary traditions were properly preserved in Taiwan. This claim to authenticity, common among Fu's generation, was in part due to the Kuomintang's Chinese nationalist political messaging which extended well beyond cuisine. The authenticity of regional Han cuisine in Taiwan has been challenged. Some sources trace the origin of instant noodles to Taiwan's jisi noodles, in particular a variation deep-fried in pork fat to be later boiled in water before serving introduced by the Qingji Ice Dessert Parlor in 1951. Following the commercialization of instant noodles Taiwanese companies including Uni-President. In 1973 Wei Lih Food Industrial introduced the first packaged instant noodle meant to be consumed "dry" (without soup or with soup on the side).

The Tatung electric steamer was introduced in the 1960s and became a staple of Taiwanese home and restaurant kitchens. The widespread adoption of the food court during the 20th century formalized more traditional hawkers and vendors. Food courts also became an important part of the malls and shopping centers which proliferated across Taiwan.

In 2002, the accession of Taiwan to the World Trade Organization forced Taiwanese farmers to compete with global markets. Many responded by shifting from staple crops to high end and niche produce primarily for local consumption. Agrotourism was also more widely adopted, with visitors to farms often being served and/or taught how to prepare dishes with the products from the farms.

In the early 21st century, ideas about sustainability and local food became more prominent in Taiwanese culinary and agricultural circles. An increased emphasis has been placed on understanding the history of food as well as incorporating indigenous foodways into mainstream Taiwanese cuisine.

=== Ingredients and culture ===
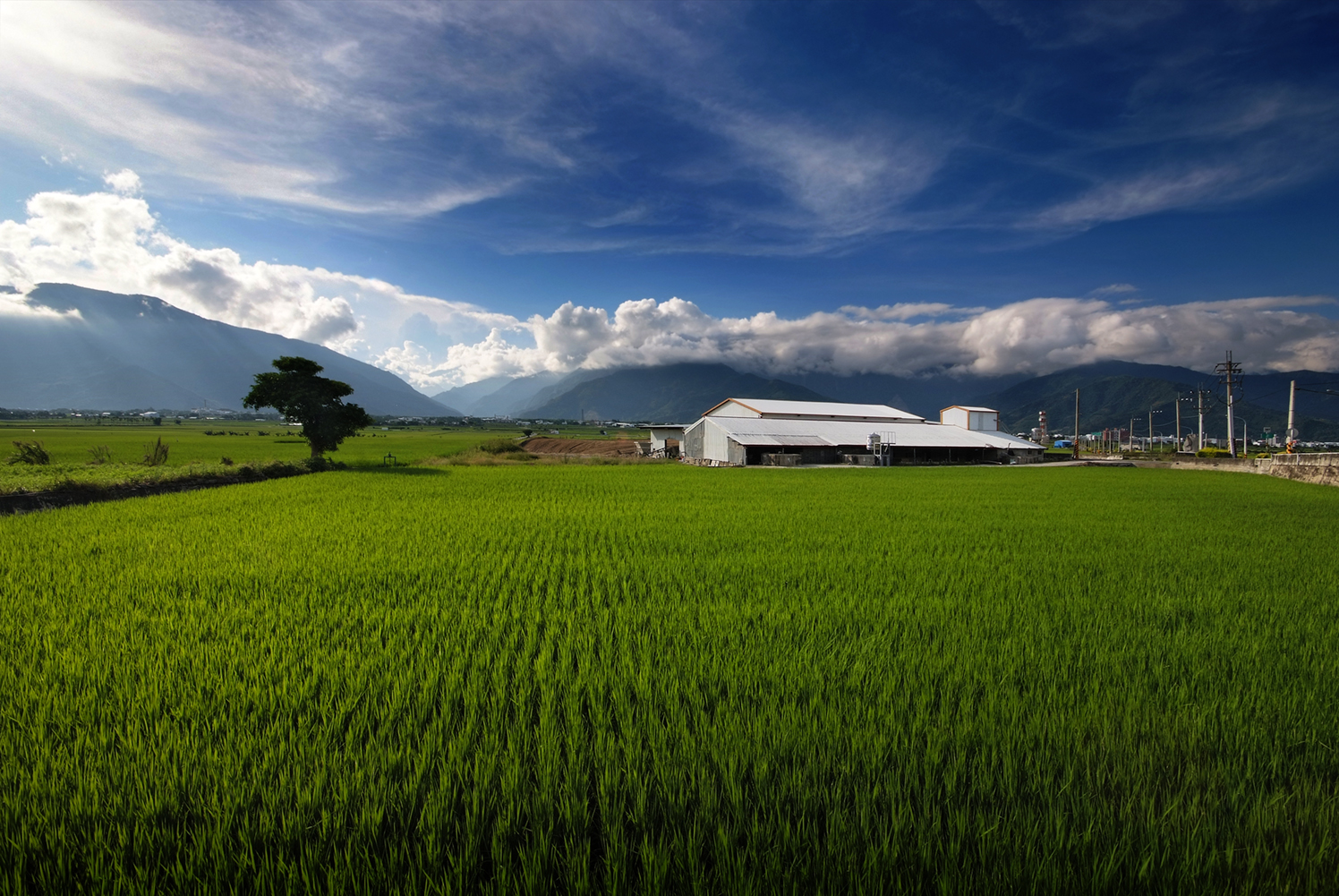
Paddy field in Hualien County

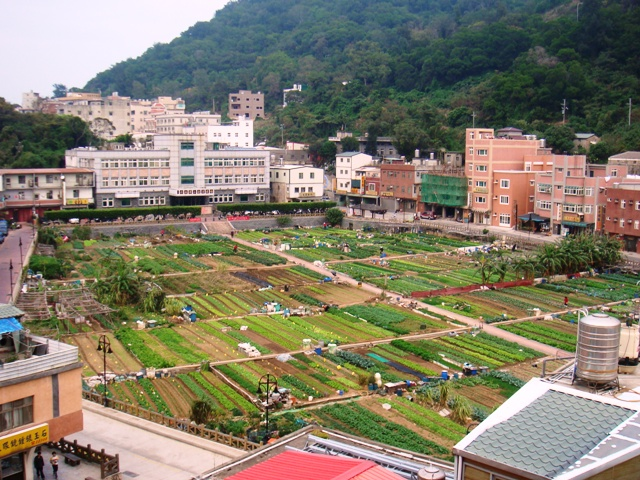
Vegetable farmland in Lienchiang County

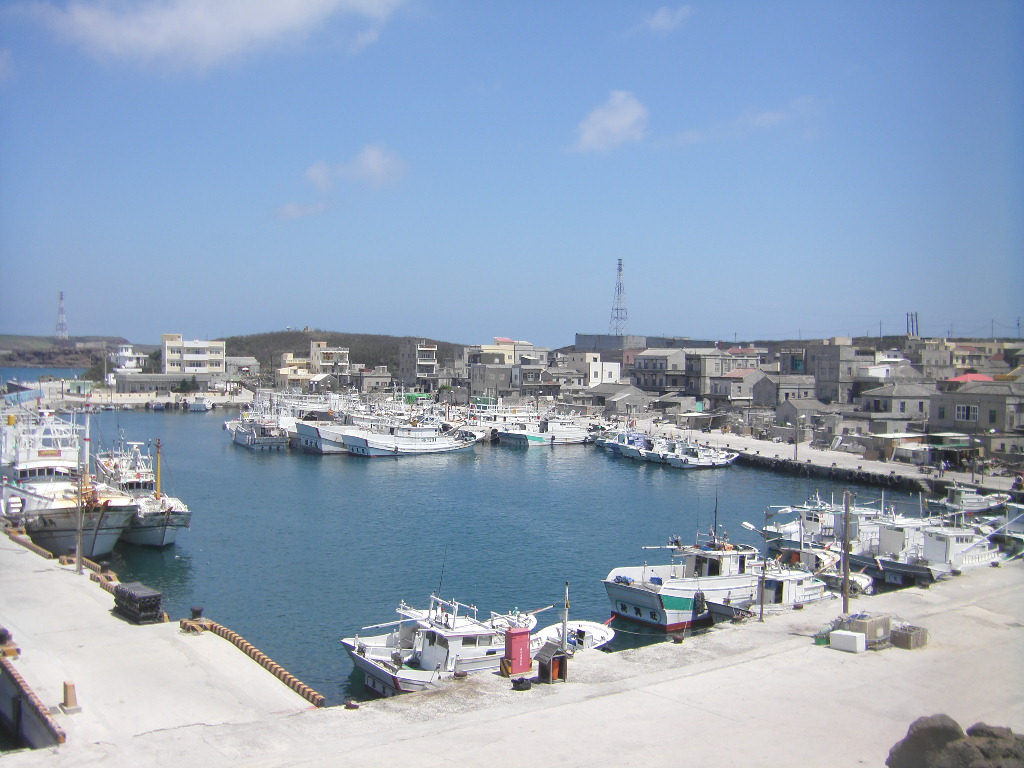
Fishing port in Penghu County

Common ingredients of Taiwanese cuisine are pork, seafood, chicken, rice, and soy. Traditionally, rice formed the basis of most Taiwanese diets. Before the Japanese colonial period, most rice grown in Taiwan was long-grained indica rice. The Japanese introduced short-grained japonica rice which quickly changed both the farming and eating patterns of the Taiwanese. Due to Japanese influence, the Taiwanese generally prefer rice that is plump, aromatic, slightly firm, and sweet. Differences between the Taiwanese and Japanese rice preferences are demonstrated by differences in their cuisine with Taiwan's more flavorful and aggressive cooking methods calling for highly aromatic rice while the Japanese prefer a more subtle and pure taste and smell. During the Japanese Colonial period, Taiwanese cuisine was divided. High-end restaurants, or wine houses, served Chinese cuisine such as Peking duck, shark fin with bird's nest soup, and braised turtle to the colonial elite. In the meantime, those without wealth or connections primarily ate rice, porridge, pickled vegetables, and sweet potato leaves. Cooking oil was considered a luxury and was only used for special occasions.

Taiwan's cuisine has also been influenced by its geographic location. Living on a crowded island, the Taiwanese had to look aside from the farmlands for sources of protein. As a result, seafood figures prominently in their cuisine. This seafood encompasses many different things, from large fish such as tuna and grouper, to sardines and even smaller fish such as anchovies. Crustaceans, squid, and cuttlefish are also eaten. Milkfish is the most popular fish in Taiwanese cuisine; it is valued for its versatility as well as its tender meat and economical price.

Beef is less common than other proteins, and some Taiwanese (particularly the elderly generation) still refrain from eating it. This stems from traditional reluctance toward slaughtering precious cattle needed for agriculture, and an emotional attachment and feeling of gratitude and thanks to the animals traditionally used for very hard labor. However, due to influences from the influx of Chinese in the 1900s, the Taiwanese version of beef noodle soup is now one of the most popular dishes in Taiwan. American food aid in the decades following WWII which primarily consisted of wheat, beef, and processed meats like Spam permanently changed the Taiwanese diet with wheat-based noodles, breads, and dumplings taking a more central role in the cuisine. Rice consumption in Taiwan reached a height of 80-90 kilograms per person per year in the 1960s and 1970s before falling as consumers shifted consumption to wheat-based foods. However, the Taiwanese still consume a large quantity of rice, particularly brown rice and exotic varieties like black, purple, and red rice. Recently rice consumption in Taiwan has enjoyed a renaissance with both growers and consumers devoting the level of care and attention to the rice that is given to high-value crops like tea.

Dumplings were a minor part of Taiwanese cuisine until the expansion in wheat consumption following WWII. Dumplings and dumpling like foods (such as xiaolongbao which is actually a small steamed bun because its wrapper contains yeast) are very popular in modern Taiwanese cuisine with most combining Chinese and Taiwanese influences. In Taiwan dumplings are often paired with hot and sour soup.

Because of the island's sub-tropical location, Taiwan has an abundant supply of various fruit, such as papayas, starfruit, melons, and citrus fruit. A wide variety of tropical fruits, imported and native, are also enjoyed in Taiwan. Other agricultural products in general are rice, corn, tea, pork, poultry, beef, fish, and other fruits and vegetables. Fresh ingredients in Taiwan are readily available from markets.

In many of their dishes, the Taiwanese have shown their creativity in their selection of spices. Typical spice mixes in Taiwanese cuisine are five-spice powder and hujiaoyan (literally pepper salt; a mixture of white pepper, salt, MSG, and sugar). A local variety of basil ("nine-pagoda") is used "lavishly in many dishes" after being heated. Widespread use of sugar is part of the legacy of Taiwan's commercial sugar industry. Taiwanese food, however, is not highly reliant on spices.

Taiwanese black vinegar has more in common with Worcestershire sauce than other black vinegars and is considered an outlier among black vinegars. Its base is sticky rice which is then aged with other ingredients in clay pots. It is used as a condiment and seasoning. Kong Yen is the largest producer of Taiwanese black vinegar. According to Bon Appetit, compared to Chinese black vinegars it is "simpler, fruitier, and cleaner." Taiwanese soy paste is a soy sauce based paste thickened with rice flour and sugar. Taiwanese mayonnaise is made with both egg whites and egg yolks and is sweetened.

An important part of Taiwanese cuisine is xiaochi (小吃), substantial snacks along the lines of Spanish tapas or Levantine meze. The Taiwanese xiaochi has gained much reputation internationally. Many travelers go to Taiwan just for xiǎochī. The most common place to enjoy xiǎochī in Taiwan is in a night market. Each night market also has its famous xiǎochī. Moreover, the Taiwanese xiǎochī has entered more "refined" eating environments. Nowadays, Taiwanese xiǎochī can be found in luxury and high-end restaurants. These restaurants use higher quality ingredients and creative presentations, reinventing dishes whilst keeping the robust flavors. The prices usually jump by twice the price or even higher in the restaurants. The Taiwanese government supports the Taiwanese xiǎochī and has held national xiǎochī events in Taiwan regularly.

Grilling is an important part of Taiwanese cuisine with many Taiwanese grilling at home and street side grills being a ubiquitous feature of night markets. Rechao (traditional Chinese: 熱炒; simplified Chinese: 热炒; lit. 'hot stir-frying') is a style of Taiwanese cuisine that uses a wok to stir-fry food. Rechao establishments create settings for numerous Taiwanese to connect with each other as they dine and converse.

Roadside banquet chefs are ubiquitous in Taiwan; these small (often single-person) catering firms provide on-location cooking for wedding banquets and other celebrations often held on the roadside. During the COVID-19 pandemic these chefs saw a significant downturn in business due to the lack of people hosting large traditional functions, especially those around the Lunar New Year. The banquet industry returned after the pandemic but have faced criticism for a lack of innovation and the repetition of traditional dishes.

=== Vegetarianism and veganism ===
Vegetarian restaurants are commonplace in Taiwan with a wide variety of dishes, mainly due to the influence of Buddhism and other syncretistic religions like I-Kuan Tao. These vegetarian restaurants vary in style from all-you-can-eat to pay-by-the-weight and the regular order-from-a-menu. Vegetarian restaurants and foods are often marked with a left-facing swastika.

In the 21st century, Taiwan has seen a rise in non-religious vegetarians, especially among the young. There has also been a rise in veganism with concerns about animal welfare, personal health, environmental sustainability, and climate change driving both trends. Taiwan's traditional vegetarian products companies have also expanded into the booming fake meat market. The traditional culinary use of fake meat in Taiwan has given Taiwanese companies an edge and Taiwan is now a market leader in the fake meat sector. Taiwanese companies do a significant amount of export business, particularly in the European, North American, and Southeast Asian markets. Hung Yang Foods, one of the largest producers of fake meat products, does 80% of their business overseas with their products being stocked in 90% of Australian supermarkets.

In 2010 the Ministry of Education (Taiwan) began encouraging educational institutions to go entirely vegetarian one day a week. By 2018 vegetarianism and veganism were widespread with 12-16% of Taiwan's population reporting that they did not eat meat. In 2023, there were approximately 6,000 vegetarian restaurants in Taiwan.

== Regional specialties ==
Defining dishes by region
| Region | Dish | Han characters | Taiwanese Hokkien (pe̍h-ōe-jī) | Description | Photo |
|---|---|---|---|---|---|
| Changhua | ba-wan | 肉圓 | bah-ôan | Literally meaning 'meat sphere'. They are a kind of large dumpling made from a gelatinous tapioca starch dough and stuffed with pork and vegetables, most commonly mushrooms and bamboo shoots. | |
| Chiayi | turkey rice | 火雞肉飯 | hoe-koe bah-pn̄g | Bowls of rice with shredded turkey layered on top, often accompanied by pickled radish. The rice is drizzled with a kind of gravy made from the turkey drippings and soy sauce. | |
| Chiayi/Tainan | Coffin bread | 棺材板 | koaⁿ-chhâ-pang | Similar to French toast or bread bowl soups, but filled with savory fillings, such as black pepper beef or curried chicken. Thick-cut bread is dipped in egg, deep fried, cut along three sides, opened and filled, and eaten. | |
| Daxi | Daxi dried tofu | 大溪豆乾 | Tāi-khe tāu-koaⁿ | Firm tofu fried and braised in a sweet soy-based sauce and then dried. | |
| Hsinchu | pork balls | 貢丸 | kòng-ôan | Often eaten in soup (湯; thng). | |
| Hsinchu | rice vermicelli | 米粉 | bí-hún | Thin al-dente rice noodles. Often eaten 'dry' (乾; ta/kan, without soup) with mushroom and ground pork. | |
| Keelung | Egg sausage | 蛋腸 | nn̄g-tn̂g | Almost exclusively found in Keelung, this distinctive hot-pot ingredient is crafted by filling pig intestine casings with seasoned egg liquid. When boiled, the egg expands inside the casing, creating plump, round ends that resemble tiny macarons | |
| Nantou | yi mein | 意麵 | ì-mī | Soft tender noodles in soup. | |
| Penghu | Pumpkin rice vermicelli | 金瓜米粉 | kim-kue bí-hún | Stir-fried noodle dish made with thin rice vermicelli and shredded pumpkin. | |
| Pingtung County | Wanluan pork knuckle | 萬巒豬腳 | Bān-bân-ti-kha | Ham hock dish wherein the meat is simmered in a broth flavored with dozens of spices and traditional Chinese medicinal herbs, including star anise and cinnamon. | |
| Taichung | suncake | 太陽餅 | | One of the most noted pastries of Taichung, suncake is a baked layered puff pastry with a sweet center often made with honey or molasses. | |
| Tainan | Milkfish congee | 虱目魚肚粥 | sat-ba̍k-hî tō͘ môe | Breakfast dish consisting of a congee with milkfish belly. | |
| Tainan | Nabeyaki egg noodles | 小卷米粉 | ko-sio ì-mī | Noodle soup dish consisting of fried egg noodles cooked in a small pot with broth, vegetables, meat, seafood, and a poached egg | |
| Tainan | Neritic squid rice noodles | 鍋燒意麵 | sió-kńg-bí-hún | Rice noodle dish consisting neritic squid and celery. | |
| Tainan | ta-a mi | 擔仔麵 | tàⁿ-á-mī | Also known as slack season noodles. Yellow "oily noodles" shown served with minced pork, shrimp, bean sprouts, cilantro, black vinegar, garlic, soy sauce and egg. | |
| Tainan | shrimp and pork meatballs | 蝦仁肉丸 | hê-jîn bah-ôan | Shrimp crackers/biscuits are among the most notable local dishes. Another popular dish originating in Tainan is "oily rice" (臺南油飯; Tâi-lâm iû-pn̄g), a rice dish containing savory oils and shredded pork meat, mushrooms and dried shrimp. | |
| Tamsui | a-gei | 阿給 | a-geh | Deep-fried tofu that have been stuffed with crystal noodles and sealed with fish paste and drizzled with spicy sauce on the outside. | |
| Tamsui | Tamsui fish ball | 魚丸 | hî-ôan | Tamsui is near the ocean and known for their fish balls of fish paste stuffed with meat and garlic cooked in light broth. | |
| Tamsui | iron eggs | 鐵蛋 | thih-nn̄g | Eggs that have been repeatedly stewed in a mix of spices and air-dried. The resulting eggs are dark brown, chewy and more flavorful than ordinary boiled eggs. Pictured with a regular boiled egg. | |
| Yilan | Peanut ice cream roll | 花生捲冰淇淋 | thôo-tāu-hu-kńg-ōo-ping | Thin crepe filled with pineapple, taro, or peanut ice cream and covered with shaved maltose peanut and cilantro. | |
| Yilan | Tāu-kuann-tshiám | 一串心 | Tāu-kuann-tshiám | Skewered food made by stuffing various cooked ingredients into hollow fried tofu and threading them onto a long bamboo skewer. | |
| Yilan | Se-lóo-bah | 西魯肉 | Se-lóo-bah | assorted thickened soup (什錦羹) or potage. | |

== Typical dishes ==
| Common English term | Han characters | Taiwanese Hokkien (Tâi-uân Lô-má-jī Phing-im Hong-àn) | Mandarin Pinyin | Influence | Description | Photo |
|---|---|---|---|---|---|---|
| Koah-pau | 刈包 | kuah-pau | guàbāo | Fujian | Flat, clam-shaped steamed white bun with soy sauce braised porkbelly, pickled mustard vegetables, peanut powder, sugar, and cilantro inside. | |
| Cuttlefish geng | 魷魚羹 | jiû-hî keⁿ | yóuyúgēng | Local | Clear thick soup with cuttlefish covered in fish paste. | Cuttlefish geng |
| Oyster omelette | 蚵仔煎 | ô-á-tsian | ézǐjiān | Fujian | Chewy omelette made with eggs, oysters, tapioca starch and Garland chrysanthemum leaves: soft, sticky texture, eaten with a sweet and mildly spicy sauce and topped with cilantro. Very common in night markets and the most popular snack in Taiwan. | |
| Oyster vermicelli | 蚵仔麵線 | ô-á mī-sòaⁿ | ézǐ miànxiàn | Local | Thickened soup containing small oysters and steamed misua (Chinese vermicelli). | |
| Bubble tea | 珍珠奶茶 | hún-înn ling-tê | zhēnzhū nǎichá | Local | The original milk tea uses black tea and milk as well as sugar. The pearls or boba are tapioca pearls that are chewy. It is a very popular drink and was invented in Taichung | 50_Lan_Bubble_Tea_20061226 |
| Ti-hueh-kué | 豬血糕 / 豬血粿 | ti-huih-ko / ti-hoeh-kóe | zhūxiěgāo/ zhūxiěguǒ | Fujian | A cake made from pork blood and rice. It is usually cut into a rectangular piece and served on a stick, dipped in soy sauce, with the option of adding hot sauce, then topped with powdered peanut and cilantro. | |
| Lo bah png (Minced pork rice) | 滷肉飯/魯肉飯 | lóo-bah-pn̄g | lǔròufàn | Fujian | Minced, cubed, or ground fatty pork, stewed in soy sauce and spices, then served on rice. | |
| Khong bah png (Braised pork rice) | 炕肉飯/爌肉飯 | khòng-bah-pn̄g | kàngròufàn | Fujian | Pork chunks, stewed in soy sauce and spices, then served on rice. | |
| Small sausage in large sausage | 大腸包小腸 | tōa-tn̂g pau sió-tn̂g | dàcháng bāo xiǎocháng | Local | A grilled Taiwanese pork sausage wrapped in a grilled, salty, sticky rice sausage. Usually wrapped with garlic and basil. Customer can also choose the flavor they want, such as black pepper, garlic, chili, butter and chocolate. A Taiwanese snack, common in night markets. | |
| Sanbeiji | 三杯雞 | sam-poe-koe | sānbēijī | Jiangxi | A chicken dish which literally translates as "three cups chicken", named because the sauce is made of a cup of rice wine, a cup of sesame oil, and a cup of soy sauce. Alternatively, the sauce can also be made of a cup each of rice wine, sugar and soy sauce. | |
| Dried radish omelet | 菜脯蛋 | tshài-póo-nn̄g | càifǔdàn | Fujian | Finely cut Taiwanese-style preserved white radish cooked into an omelet | Taiwanese preserved radish omelet |
| olen | 黑輪 | o͘-lián | Hēi lún | Japan | This is used fish cake, a fish sauce made with fish soup, than cooked in a pot with different ingredients, similar to oden. | |
| Cucumber pork | 瓜子肉 | koe-á bah | guāzǐròu | Guangdong | Steamed, minced pork with Taiwanese-style pickled cucumber. | |
| Spicy hotpot | 麻辣鍋 | | málàguō | Sichuan | It is increasingly popular, especially in Taipei. The soup of this hotpot is very spicy, inclusive of Chinese herbs and other special materials. People can cook what they want with this soup. | |
| Eel noodles | 鱔魚意麵 | siān-hî ì-mī | shànyú yìmiàn | Local | Rice eel with yi mein in a starch-thickened sweet and sour soup. | |
| Tamsui a-gei | 淡水阿給 | Tām-chúi a-geh | Dànshuǐ āgěi | Local | Steamed aburaage tofu stuffed with cooked cellophane noodles and covered with surimi | |
| Danbing | 蛋餅 | nn̄g-piáⁿ | Dàn bǐng | Local | A breakfast dish made by kneading flour, potato starch, glutinous rice flour and water into a thin dough, and an omelet is baked on top. | |
| Iron eggs | 鐵蛋 | thih-nn̄g | tiědàn | Local | Eggs stewed in soy sauce, usually with their shells still on but cracked throughout, until they are flavorful and chewy in texture. | |
| Chhau-a-koe | 草仔粿 | tsháu-á-kué/tsháu-á-ké | cǎozaǐguǒ | Fujian | A type of kuih made with glutinous rice flour, sugar, and a ground cooked paste of Jersey cudweed or Chinese mugwort. Often filled with dried shrimp, shiitake mushrooms, white radish (菜脯), and deep-fried shallots. | |
| Moon shrimp cake | 月亮蝦餅 | | yuèliàng xiābǐng | Thai/Southeast Asia | Commonly found in Taiwanese Thai restaurants. Shrimp, garlic, and pork fat are pounded then spread on a circular spring roll wrapper. Another wrapper is placed over top and the cake is pan-fried and served with sweet chili sauce. | |
| Pineapple shrimp balls | 鳳梨蝦球 | ông-lâi hê kiû | fènglí xiā qiú | Local | Commonly found in Taiwan rechao restaurants. Large shrimps are peeled, battered, and deep-fried until crisp, mixed with pineapple chunks, and coated with mayonnaise | |
| Taiwanese Beef Noodle Soup | 臺灣牛肉麵 | Tâi-oân gû-bah mī | táiwān niúròumiàn | Local | Red-braised version of beef noodle soup. | |
| Tsang Ying Tou | 蒼蠅頭 | | cāng yíng tóu | Sichuan | Dish consisting of a stir-fried garlic chives, minced pork, and fermented black beans. | |
| Tshik-á-mī | 摵仔麵 | tshi̍k-á-mī | qīezǐ miàn | Northern Taiwan | Yellow, lye water–treated egg noodles cooked by steeping in hot broth with a strainer, then lifted and shaken repeatedly to remove excess liquid and achieve the desired bite. | |
| Tube rice pudding | 筒仔米糕 | tâng-á-bí-ko | Tǒng zǐ mǐ gāo | Local | Dish consisting of a stir-fried glutinous rice mixture that is seasoned and steamed in a bamboo tube. | |
| Ginger duck | 薑母鴨 | kiunn-bó-ah | Jiāng mǔ yā | | Traditional Taiwanese hot pot dish prepared by simmering duck meat in a broth made from rice wine, ginger, and herbal ingredients. The dish is typically eaten hot and is widely believed in Taiwanese food culture to have warming, restorative and nourishing properties. | Ginger duck |
| Sio-tsiú-ke | 燒酒雞 | Sio-tsiú-ke | Shāo jiǒu jī | | Traditional Taiwanese chicken dish prepared by simmering chicken with rice wine and a variety of traditional medicinal herbs, and is generally regarded as a seasonal nourishing food in Taiwan. | |
| Mutton hot pot | 羊肉爐 | Iûnn-bah-lôo | yáng ròu lú | | Taiwanese traditional dish consisting of lamb or mutton simmered in a seasoned broth and served as a communal hot pot, often accompanied by vegetables, tofu, and mushrooms. | Mutton hot pot |
| Ribs stewed in medicinal herbs | 藥燉排骨 | Io̍h-thâu-á pâi-kut) | yào dùen páigǔ | | Taiwanese traditional dish consisting of lean pork ribs that are simmered for an extended period and blanched to remove impurities before being slowly stewed with a mixture of traditional Taiwanese herbal ingredients | Ribs stewed in medicinal herbs |

There is a type of outdoor barbecue called khòng-iô. To barbecue in this manner, one first builds a hollow pyramid up with dirt clods. Next, charcoal or wood is burnt inside until the temperature inside the pyramid is very high (the dirt clods should be glowing red). The ingredients to be cooked, such as taro, yam, or chicken, are placed in cans, and the cans are placed inside the pyramid. Finally, the pyramid is toppled over the food until cooked.

Many non-dessert dishes are usually considered snacks, not entrees; that is, they have a similar status to Cantonese dim sum or Spanish tapas. Such dishes are usually only slightly salted, with many vegetables accompanying the main meat or seafood item.

Taiwanese dishes

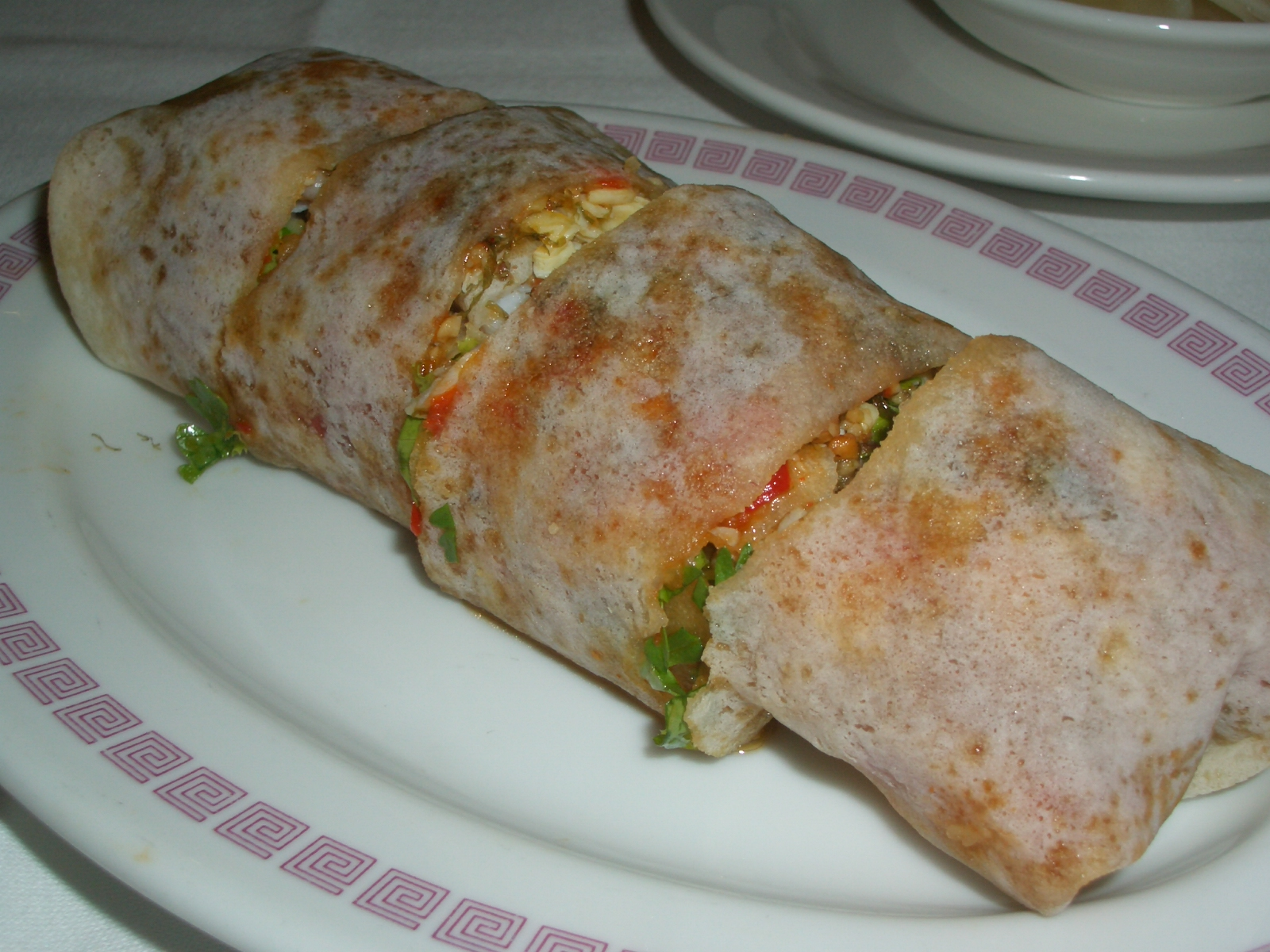
Lūn-piánn with vegetables and powdered peanuts as filling

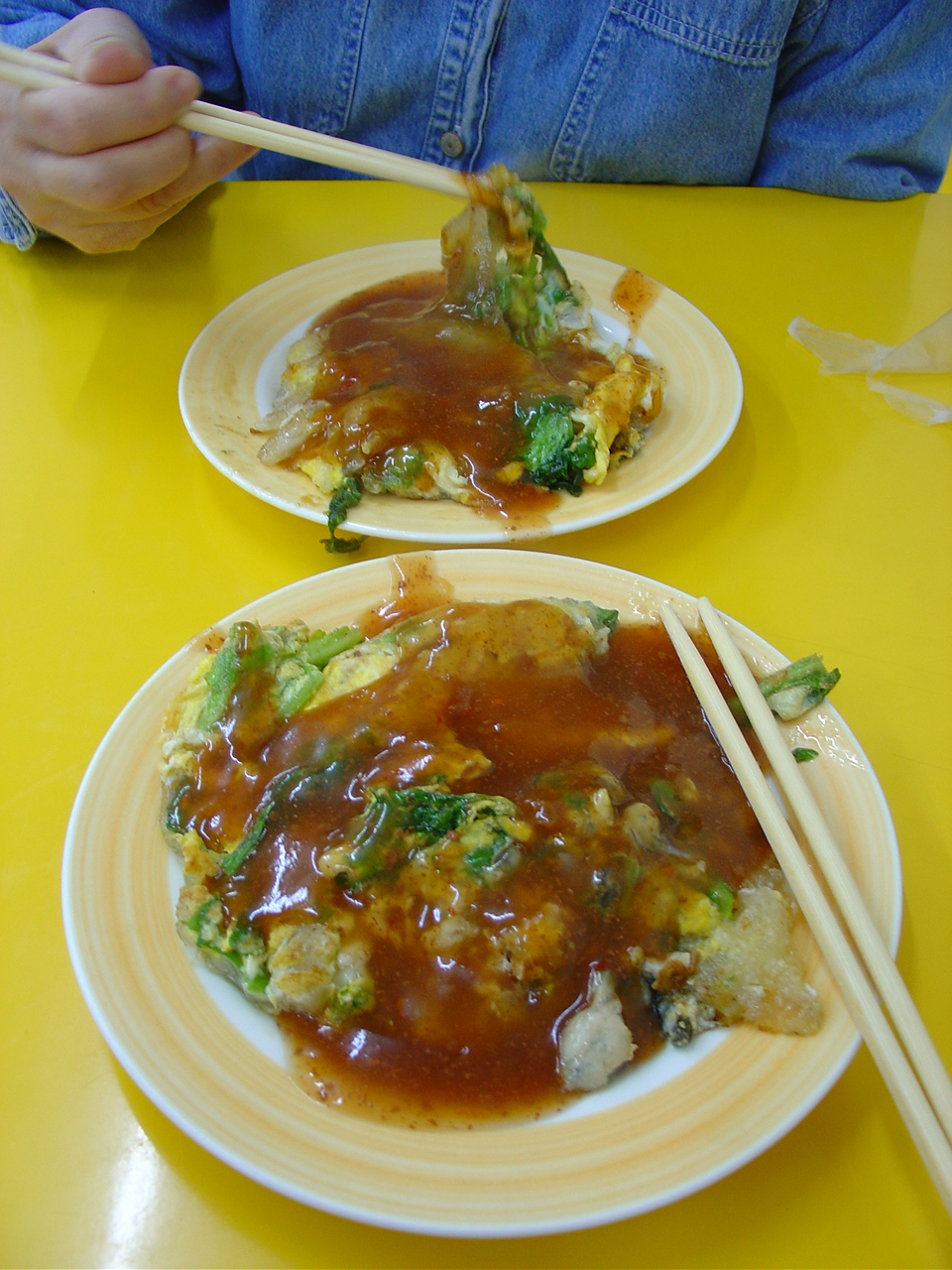
Oyster omelette from Chien-Cheng Circle, Datong District (Taipei).

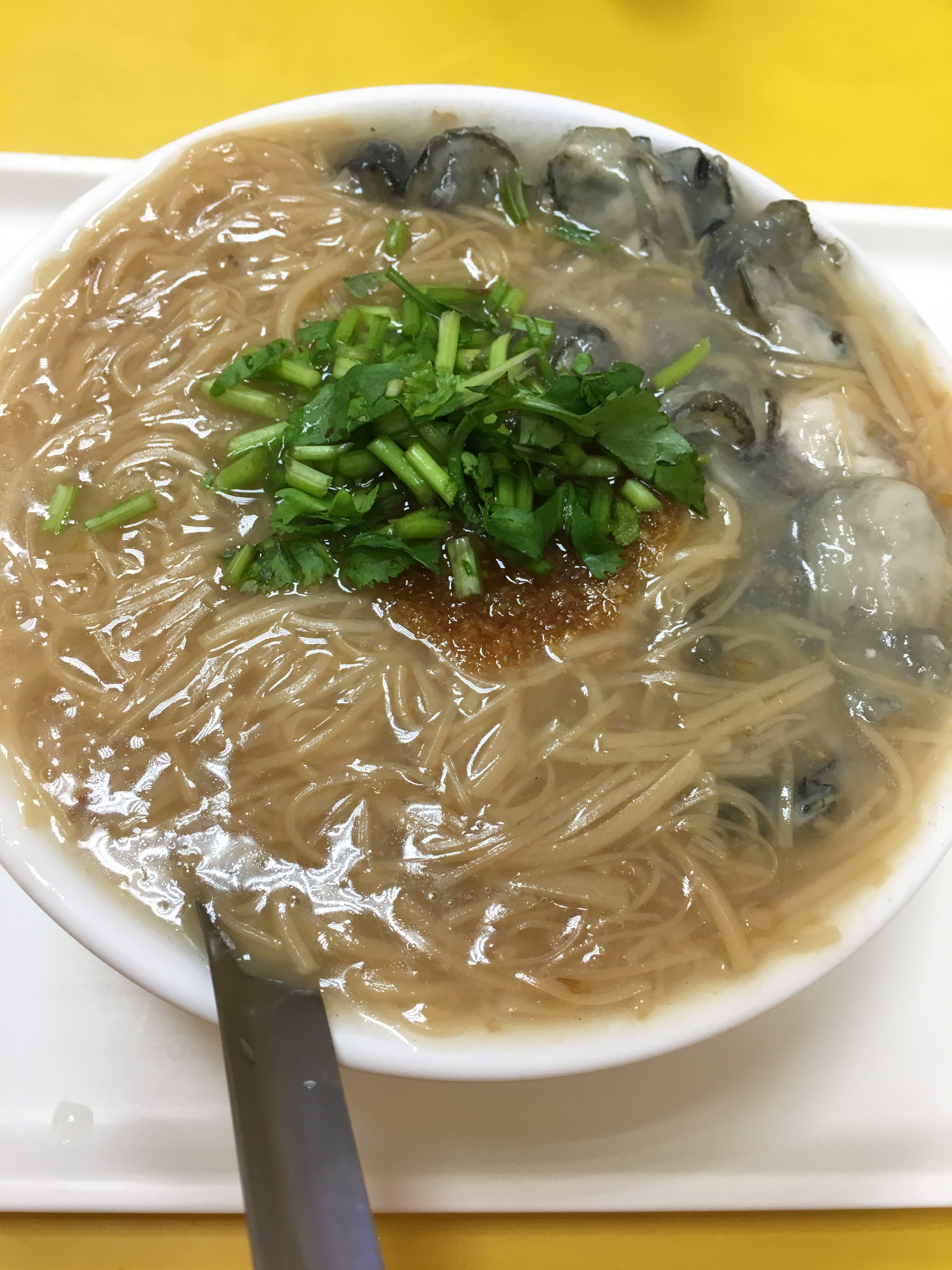
A bowl of oyster vermicelli

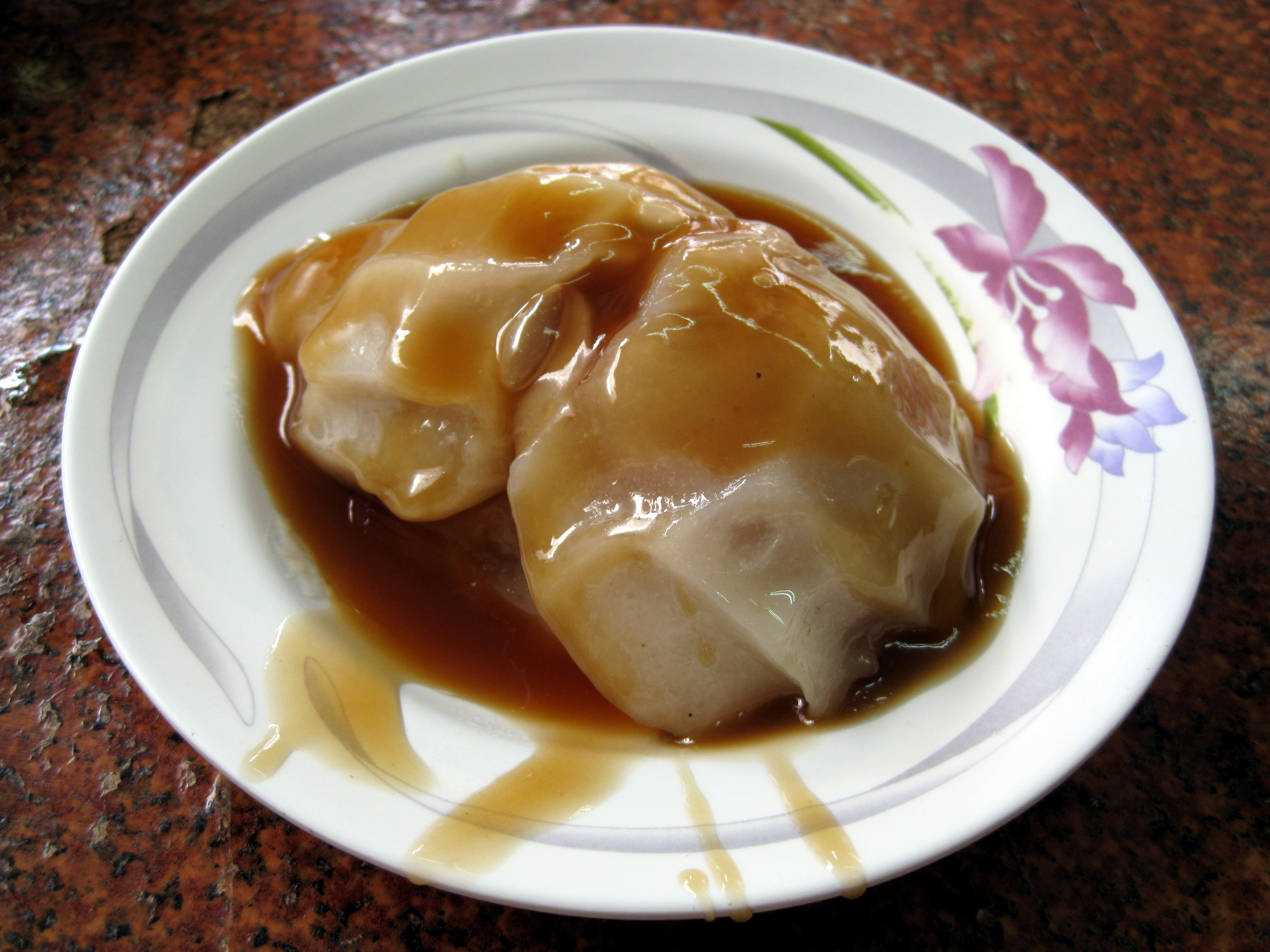
Ba-wan served with sweet and savory sauce

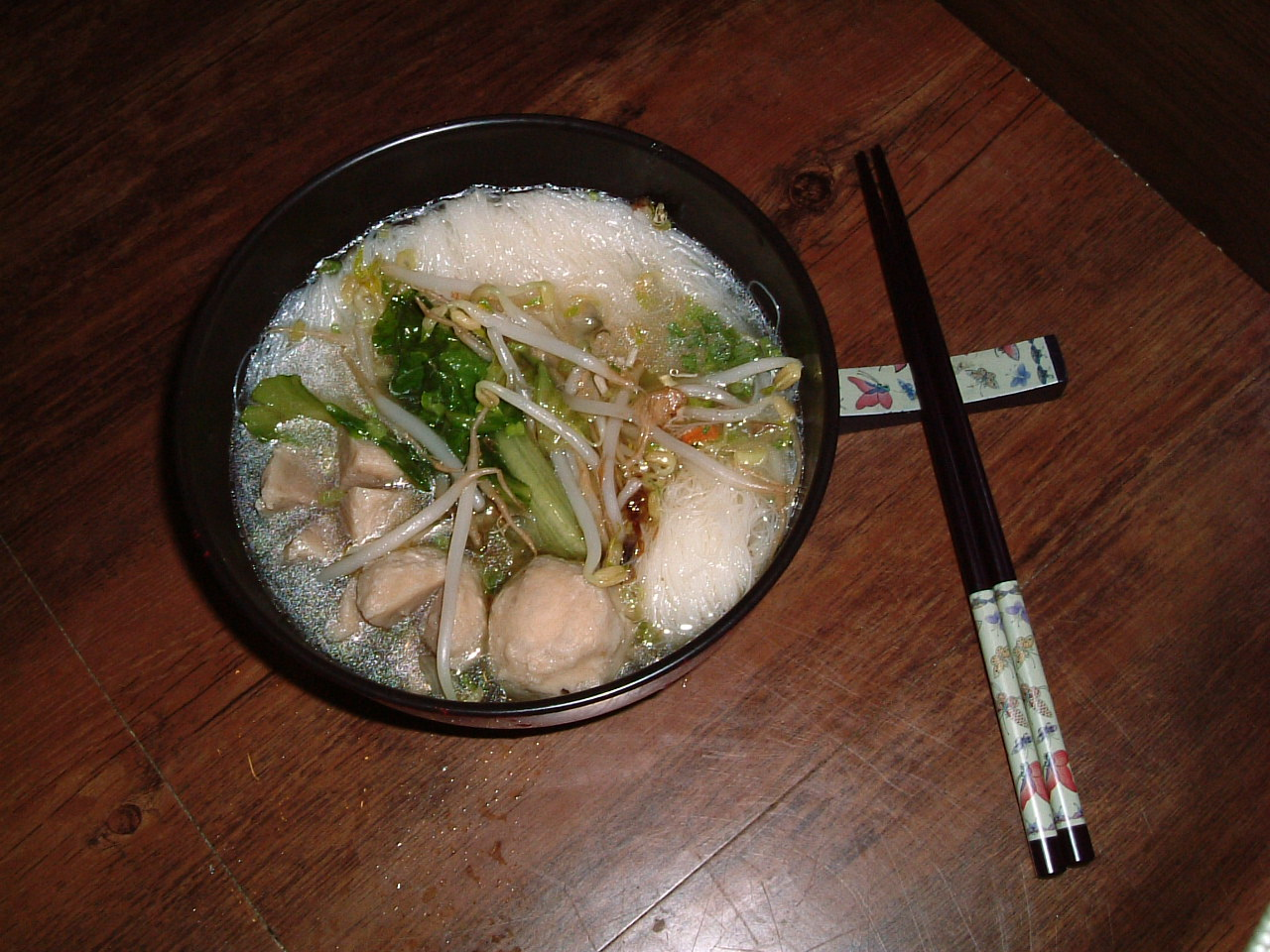
Pork ball and rice vermicelli in soup

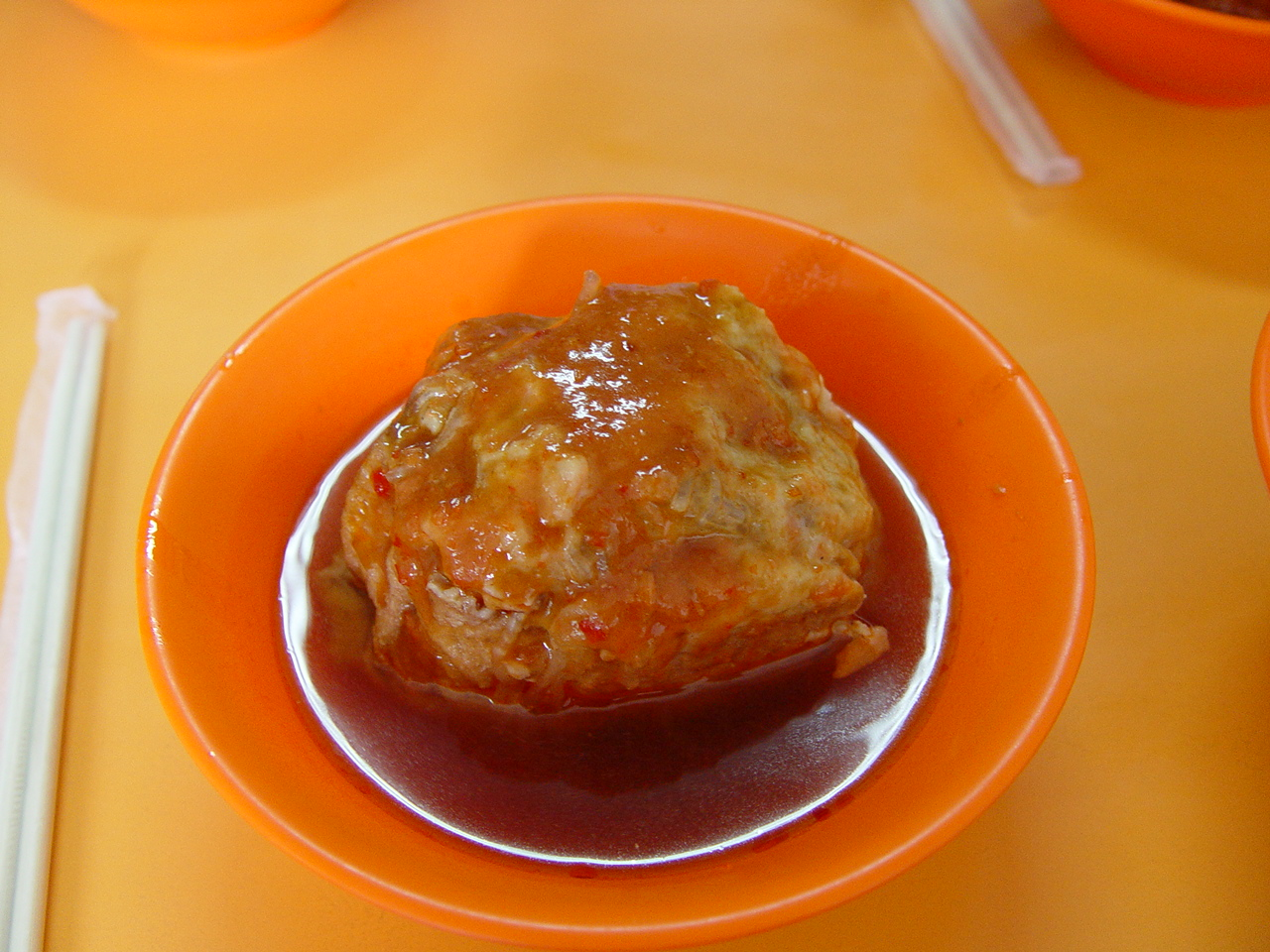
A-gei served with sauce

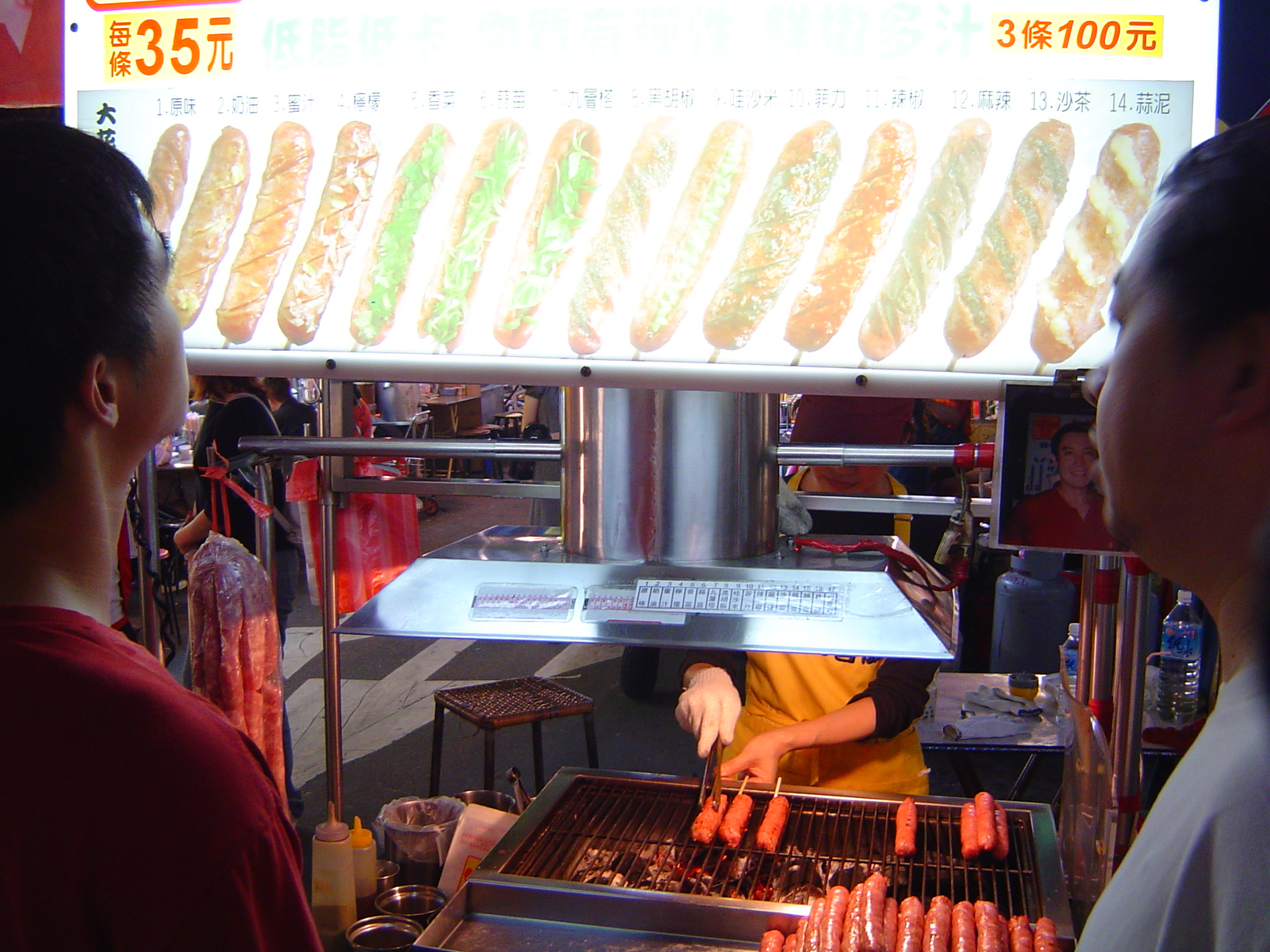
Many flavors of Taiwanese sausages are sold by night market vendors

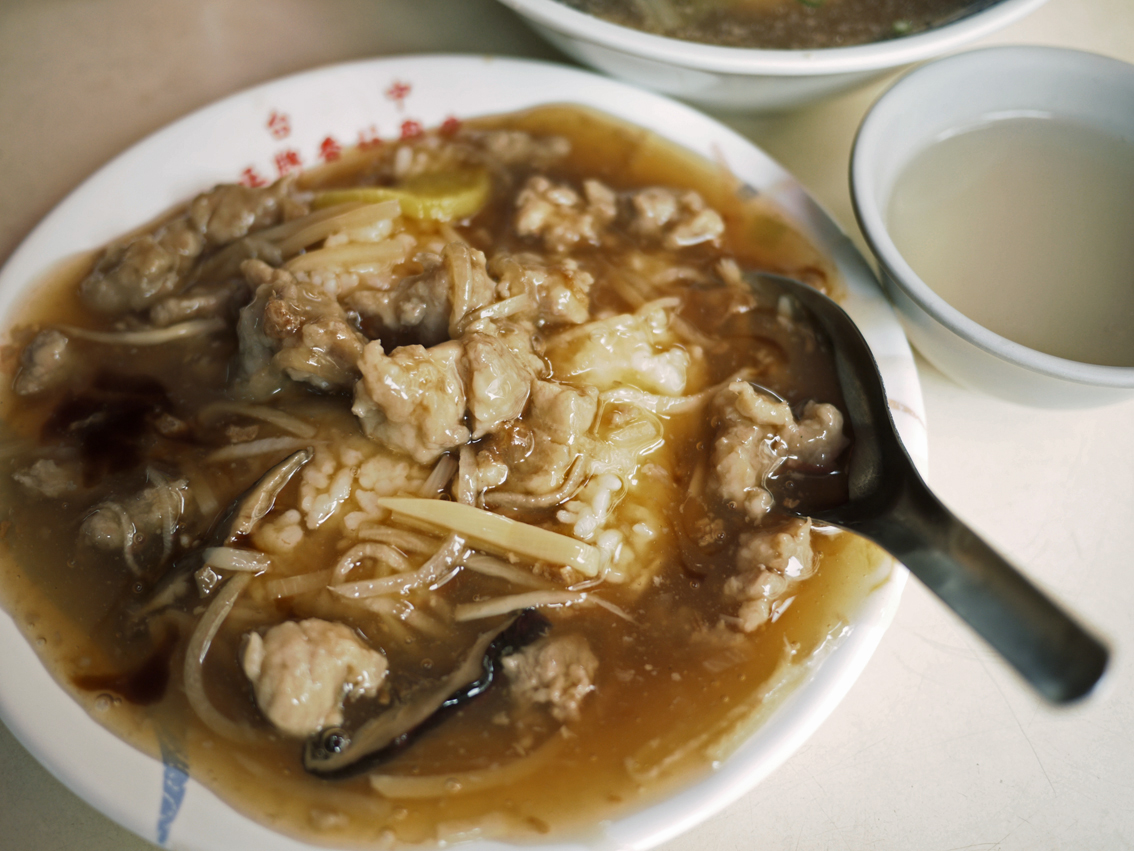
Pork and shiitake geng over rice from an eatery in Taichung

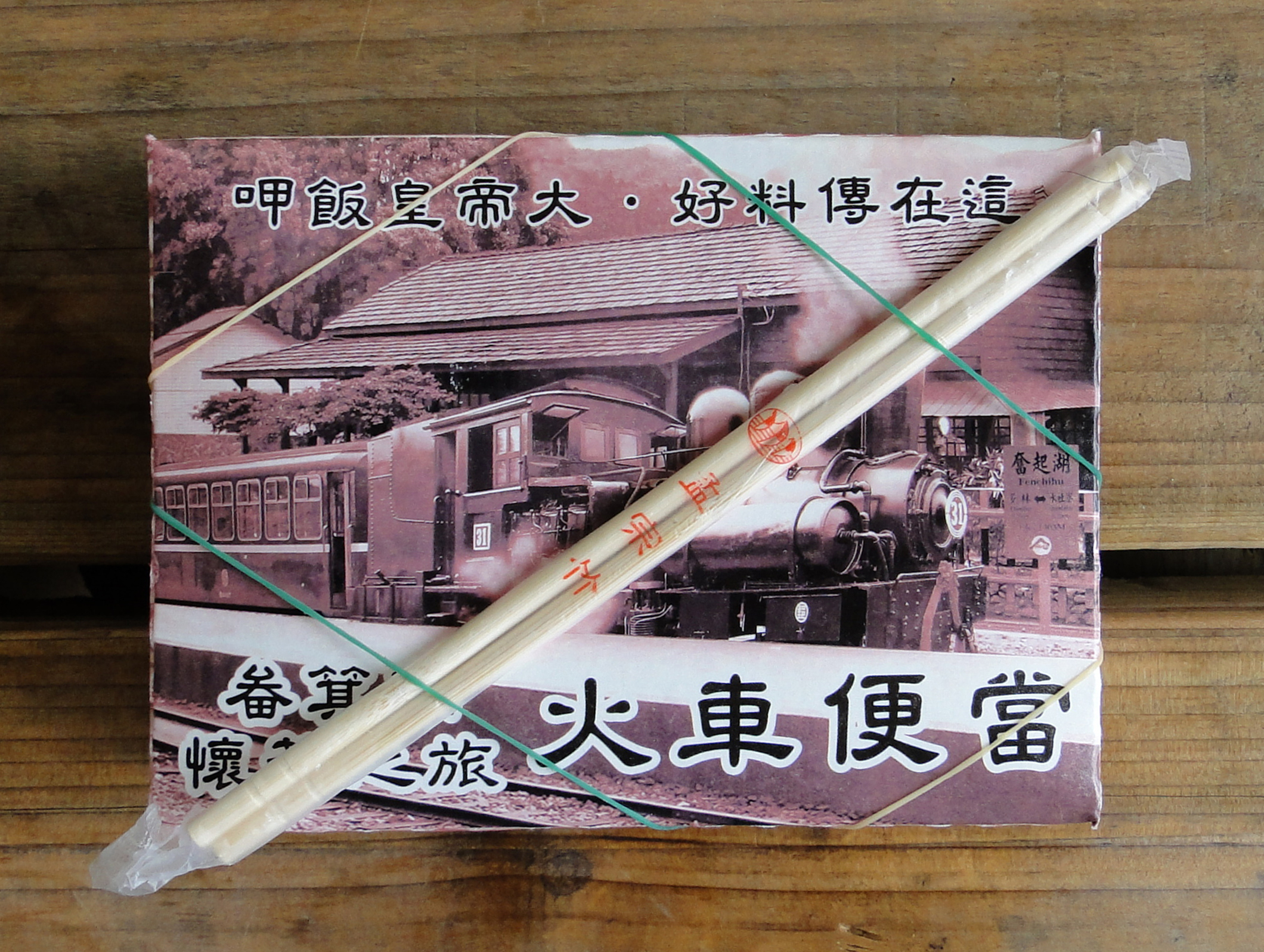
A Fenchihu Bento box

== Desserts ==
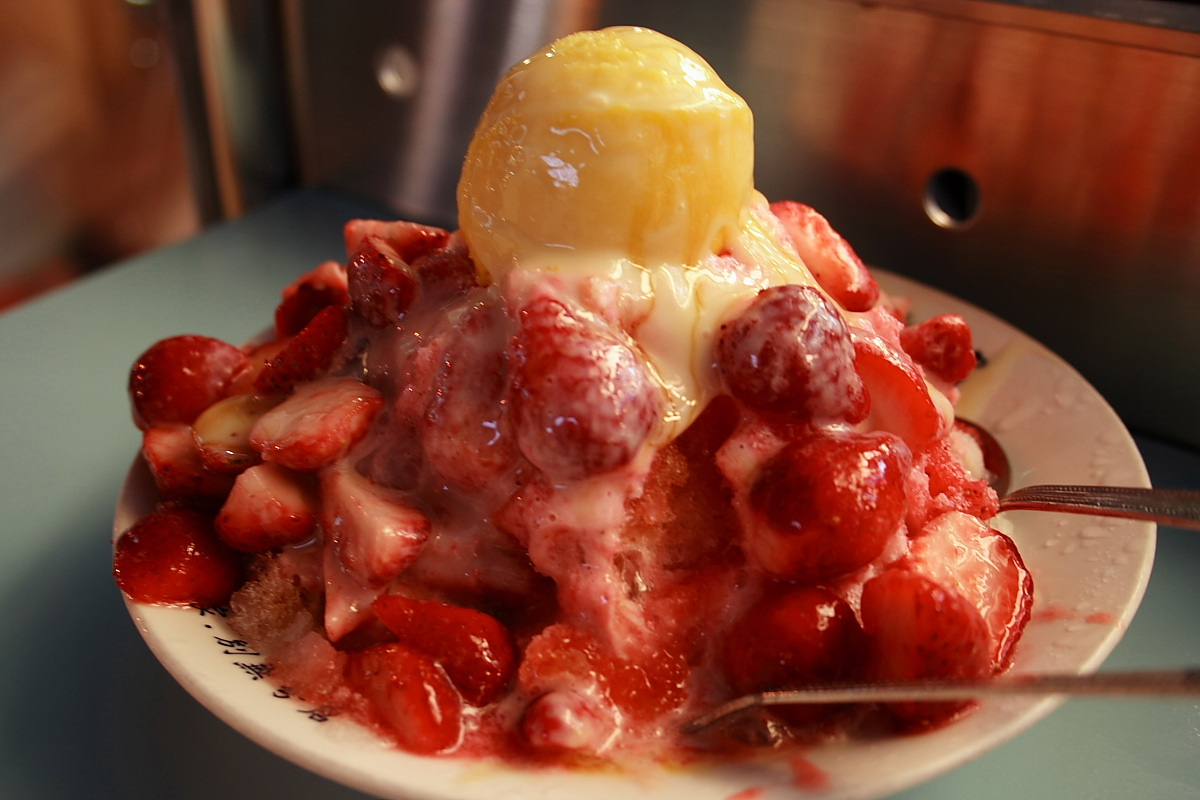
A plate of tshuah-ping with strawberries and condensed milk

- Aiyu jelly – a gelatinous dessert made from the seeds of a creeping fig, Ficus pumila var. awkeotsang. Served on ice.
- ō͘-á-peng (芋仔冰; ō͘-á-peng) – an ice cream made of taro root paste.
- Tshuah-ping (also known as Baobing) – a Taiwanese shaved ice dessert very common in China, Taiwan, Malaysia, and Vietnam.
- Xue-bing (雪花冰) - also called "xue hua bing," translated to "snow ice," "snowflake ice," or "shaved snow." This is different from baobing/tshuah-ping in that the base mixture for the ice is creamy (milk is generally added, but it can be dairy or plant based), the ice itself often has a flavor dissolved in (milk, taro, chocolate, coffee, etc.), the texture of the shaved snow is very fine, and it melts near-instantaneously, upon contact. The ice for this is typically cylindrical, and the shaved snow comes out of the machine in ruffled ribbons. Some additional common toppings include but are not limited to: sweetened condensed milk, mangoes, sweetened red beans, sweetened mung beans, boba pearls, or taro.
- Bubble tea, aka boba milk tea; also known as pearl milk tea - chewy tapioca balls added to milk tea.
- Traditional cakes are not always of the same composition depending on the flavor. There is the moon cake which has a thick filling usually made from lotus seed paste or sweetened red bean paste and surrounded by a relatively thin (2–3 mm) crust and may contain yolks from salted duck eggs. It is traditionally eaten during the festival for lunar worship and moon watching. Mooncakes are offered between friends or on family gatherings while celebrating the festival. The Mid-Autumn Festival is one of the four most important Chinese festivals.

There are other cakes that can mix salty ingredients with sweet ones to create a balance while enjoying these delicacies with tea. The crust could be shiny from applying a layer of egg yolk before putting in the oven, or not in that case it is often whiter and the crust has more layers.

- Grass jelly (Chinese: 仙草; Pe̍h-ōe-jī: sian-chháu) – (Mesona procumbens) Served hot or cold.
- Moachi (麻糍; môa-chî), a soft rice cake like Japanese daifuku mochi. Flavors of the fillings can vary, ranging from all kinds of beans to nuts.
- Pineapple cake (Chinese: 王梨酥; Pe̍h-ōe-jī: ông-lâi-so͘)- a square short crust pie filled with pineapple filling. One of Taiwan's best known dessert pastries and souvenir of choice.
- Chhau-a-koe – Cakes made with a dough from glutinous rice flour and combine with a ground cooked paste of Gnaphalium affine or Mugwort to give it a unique flavor and green color. The dough is commonly filled with ground meat or sweet bean pastes.
- Douhua (豆花) - Soft tofu served with syrup and toppings such as peanuts, adzuki beans, tapioca, and mung beans. Served hot or cold.
- Chocolate - Taiwan's cocoa production is centered in Pingtung in Southern Taiwan. As of 2020 approximately 200-300 acres was under cultivation in Pingtung supporting around 30 chocolate making companies. Taiwan is one of the few mature chocolate making countries to also be a cocoa producer.

== Night market dishes ==
Taiwan's best-known snacks are present in the night markets, where street vendors sell a variety of different foods, from finger foods, drinks, sweets, to sit-down dishes. In these markets, one can also find fried and steamed meat-filled buns, oyster-filled omelets, fruit ices, and much more. Aside from snacks, appetizers, entrees, and desserts, night markets also have vendors selling clothes and accessories, and offer all kinds of entertainment and products. Street vendors used to be common across Taiwan but due to increasing regulations and health safety concerns are now primarily found at night markets and food courts. Taiwanese food courts incorporate ideas from traditional night markets as well as importing ideas from the United States and Japan. Food courts have become ubiquitous across Taiwan. Many night market dishes can now be found outside night markets.

In 2014, The Guardian called Taiwan's night markets the "best street food markets in the world". Some, such as Shilin Night Market, have become as popular with tourists as they are with locals, leading to complaints that they have lost a measure of their authentic flavor though commercialization.

| Common English term | Han Characters | Taiwanese Hokkien (Tâi-lô) | Mandarin Pinyin | Influence | Description | Photo |
|---|---|---|---|---|---|---|
| Takoyaki | 章魚燒 | | | Japanese | A ball-shaped snack that is filled with diced octopus and fried in a flour-based batter, eaten with condiments such as wasabi. | |
| Wheel pie | 車輪餅 | chhia-lûn-piáⁿ | chēlúnbǐng | Japanese | Pancake batter is poured into hot metallic molds and quickly cooked into small cakes of various shapes. Countless variations exist. Sometimes the cakes have fillings ranging from cream, red bean paste, to peanut butter. Similar to imagawayaki or taiyaki | |
| Stinky tofu | 臭豆腐 | chhàu-tāu-hū | chòudòufǔ | Chinese | Stinky tofu is popular in Taiwan. It is called "stinky tofu" because of its strong unpleasant odour. Back in the Qing dynasty, stinky tofu was already a dish in the royal family's meals. It was also one of the favorite foods of the Empress Dowager Cixi. Stinky tofu can generally be classified as either soft stinky tofu (臭豆腐乳) or dried stinky tofu (臭豆腐乾). | |
| Taiwanese meatball | 肉圓 | bah-oân | ròuyuán | Local | A sticky gelatinous tapioca dough filled with pork, bamboo shoots, and shiitake mushrooms, and served with a savory sweet and spicy sauce. | |
| Maize | 玉米 | | yùmǐ | American | Vendors may specialize in one type of corn or offer varieties between savory/salty and sweet corn. The corn may be steamed, grilled, or boiled, or prepared another way. | |
| Taiwanese sausages | 香腸 | ian-chhiâng (煙腸) | xiāngcháng | Chinese | Fatty pork sausages with a mild sweet taste. There are several different kinds. Kaoliang wine is sometimes used in the sausage recipe. In night markets they are often served on a stick with many different condiments. Sometimes, they are wrapped in glutinous rice. In the very early 1980s, when resources were still relatively scarce, the standard serving was one sausage link on a toothpick garnished with a clove of garlic. | |
| Green onion pancake | 蔥油餅 | | cōngyóubǐng | Chinese | Spring onion flour pancake with many thin layers, made with scallions (chopped green onions). Cheese and egg are popular additional fillings. A snack originating from China. | |
| Tanghulu | 糖葫蘆 | | tánghúlú | Chinese | Red candy-coated bite-sized fruit served on a stick. Sometimes the fruit is stuffed with preserved plums and then candied. Cherry tomatoes and strawberries are also used. | |
| Grilled squid | 烤花枝 | | kǎo huāzhī | Japanese | Grilled squid, often marinated and basted while grilled. | |
| Shaved ice | 礤冰/剉冰/刨冰 | chhoah-peng | cuòbīng/bàobīng | Local | Finely shaven ice with a variety of toppings (peanuts, fruit, azuki beans, sweetened corn, and so on). Sometimes served drizzled with condensed milk. | |
| Oden | 甜不辣 | | tiánbùlà | Japanese | Deep-fried surimi and fish cakes simmered in broth and served with a sweet sauce. It is similar to satsuma-age, which in some regions in Japan is called tempura. Otherwise, it is not related to Japanese tempura, similar to Japanese oden. | |
| Taiwanese spring roll | 潤餅 | jūn-piáⁿ / lūn-piáⁿ | rùnbǐng | Fujian | The Taiwanese spring roll is a semi-crispy super-thin flour crepe with a variety of fillings, such as powdered sugar, peanut powder, egg, vegetables, pork and seafood. Taiwanese spring rolls are made from the same dough as Western crêpes. | |
| Shawarma | 沙威馬 | | shāwēimǎ | West Asian | A sandwich usually made from spiced, grilled chicken and served on a leavened, white flour bun with julienned cabbage, a slice of tomato, sliced onions, ketchup and mayonnaise. Brought over from Turkey decades ago, the seasoning is quite different from the seasoning used in making shawarma in Turkey. | |
| Popcorn chicken | 鹹酥雞/鹽酥雞 | kiâm-so͘-ke / kiâm-so͘-koe | xiánsūjī / yánsūjī | American | Popcorn chicken made from spiced, deep-fried chicken topped with salt and pepper and seasoned with fragrantly cooked basil. | |
| Taiwanese fried chicken cutlet | 炸雞排/香雞排 | | zhá jīpái / xīang jīpái | American | The Taiwanese fried chicken cutlet is one of the most popular snacks in Taiwan. Fried chicken fillets first appeared in Taiwan over 20 years ago but have changed as vendors have developed new flavors and preparation methods. Chicken breasts are pounded flat, marinated, battered and deep-fried. After cooking, a generous sprinkling of ground pepper is applied. It is crispy on the outside, tender and juicy on the inside. | |
| Rousong or pork floss | 肉鬆 | | Ròusōng | Chinese | A dry and sweet topping with floss-like texture made from pork. Usually paired with pastries or rice. | |

- Various drinks are also often sold, ranging from bubble tea stands to various juice and tea stands.
- Crêpes - Adapted from the original French version, a thin cooked pancake, it has a much crispier texture, rather like a cracker. They were popular in the early 2000s.
- Fruit or bean smoothies - milk or ice is blended on the spot with fresh papaya, mango, watermelon, azuki bean, or mung bean.
- Fried glutinous rice balls - slightly sweet.

== Food of the Taiwanese Aborigines ==
Taiwan's food and food culture is very much diversified and largely influenced by the exodus of Han people. However, one part of the Taiwanese food culture that remains integral is that of the Taiwanese indigenous people. Though indigenous populations only make up approximately 1.5% of Taiwan's overall population, it is notable that their foods eaten and ways of preparation are distinguishable from the more typical Chinese-influenced cuisine.

The aborigines' diet very much depends on nature. With profuse vegetation and wild animals, the aborigines were natural hunter-gatherers. Essentially, much of what Aborigines ate depended on their environment – that is, whether they lived in coastal or mountainous areas. Tribes like Amis, Atayal, Saisiyat and Bunun hunt what they can, and gather what they cultivate. On the other hand, tribes like the Yamis and the Thao have fish as a predominant source of food. Most foods consisted of millet, taro, sweet potato, wild greens and game like boar and rat. This is in contrast to the main foods eaten by the Han, which consisted of rice and chicken.

Game meats for those living in the mountainous areas include deer, and flying squirrel intestines, a delicacy as regarded by the Bunun people. Another is 'stinky' meat – that is, 'maggoty game' that has begun to rot, which is then barbecued, fried, seasoned with garlic and ginger then served with spicy sauce.

The Amis, apart from meat, had much greens to eat, largely due to the assumption that anything a cow ate, was also edible by humans. The Bununs, who are primarily hunters of wild animals, would dine on stone-grilled pork, boar, deer, and hog roast. The Yami tribe, located off Taitung coast, fed on many types of fish, including the prized 'flying fish' (or Alibangbang). A speciality includes rice, mixed with river fish and wild vegetables, served in large bamboo trunks.

Apart from being a staple-food, millet was always produced as wine. Not just for drinking, millet wine played an important role in being used as offerings during festivals, births and weddings. Millet wines are all made in the homes of the Aborigines. Sticky rice is put into a wooden steamer after being soaked in water. Once cooled, the rice is put into a pot of water, then pulled out and combined with rice yeast. After four or five days of being placed in a large jar, the rice is placed in a sieve or rice bag, whilst the alcoholic liquid drips out and is stored away.

Also important to the Indigenous Taiwanese people's cuisine are the sweet potato and taro, favored for their perennial nature and low maintenance. The cultivation of root vegetables rather than typical seedling plants was notably prominent, with archaeological evidence suggesting as early as fourth millennium BC, from the Dapenkeng site, in Guanyin Mountain, New Taipei City.

Given the versatility of both vegetables, they were usually boiled or steamed, and eaten by itself or as ingredients in soups and stews. Without the need for advanced agricultural technology, taro and sweet potatoes were a prime preference for farming. Canadian missionary George MacKay said of 19th century Taiwan: 'the bulb of the sweet potato is planted in March. In about six weeks the vines are cut into pieces eight inches long, which are planted in drills, and from these vine-cuttings the bulbs grow and are ripe about the end of June. A second crop is planted in a similar way in July and is ripe in November.' The influence of sweet potatoes and taro has been vast. They are still widely present in modern-day Taiwan, be it on the streets, night markets, or in successful food chains like 'Meet Fresh' (or 鮮芋仙).

Due to the absence of contemporary culinary utensils such as the refrigerator, gas stovetops and ovens, the Indigenous resorted to other means to prepare their food. Upon bringing back hunted game meat, the Aborigines would preserve the meat with either millet wine or salt. Another cooking technique involved the heating up of stones by fire, which are then placed inside a vessel with other certain meats and seafood, which are cooked from the heat of the stones. Foods were mostly prepared by steaming, boiling or roasting, in order to infuse flavors together, yet preserve the original flavors. This again is contrasted with the Han, who adopted skills like stir-frying and stewing. Meat was also put on a bamboo spit and cooked over the fire.

Taiwanese indigenous cuisine incorporates certain flavors that are distinct from Han Chinese-influenced cuisine. Mountain peppercorns (shan hujiao in Chinese or magao, derived from the Atayal term maqaw) are one of these distinctive ingredients. Other indigenous ingredients include Tana, herbal Aralia, large-leaved nanmu, and indigenous cinnamon.

A cookbook published in 2000 by the CIP and National Kaohsiung University of Hospitality and Tourism, listed some foods of the main Taiwanese Aboriginal tribes, showing the Aborigines' adherence and passion for natural foods.

- Amis Nation: Alivongvong (meat and sticky rice dumpling packed in leaves) (阿里鳳鳳); Stir-fried wild vegetables
- Atayal Nation: Grilled meat on stone (石板烤肉); Langying (steamed sticky rice cake) (朗應)
- Bunun Nation: Bunun millet cake (布農粿); Millet rice (小米飯)
- Paiwan Nation: Cinavu (millet and pork meat-ball) (小米吉拿富); Jinbole (Sorghum and pork dumpling packed in a banana leaf) (金伯樂)
- Puyuma Nation: Yinafei mountain cake (以那馡山地粿); Fried wild rat with basil (九層野鼠)
- Rukai Nation: Cinavu (taro and meat dumpling) (吉拿富); Grilled boar
- Saisiyat Nation: Grilled boar with papaya (木瓜拌山豬肉); Assorted wild flowers (野花拼盤); Cassava and spareribs soup (樹薯排骨湯)
- Tsou Nation: Bamboo cooked rice (竹筒飯); Banana cake (香蕉糕)
- Yami Nation: Boiled taro and crab (芋泥加蟹肉); Grilled fish Steamed dried fish (蒸魚乾)

=== Modern Aboriginal cuisine ===
It seems that an interest in Taiwanese indigenous cuisine gained traction in the media in the mid-1990s, developing alongside increasing governmental action to protect and recognize Taiwanese indigenous peoples. There are restaurants around Taipei that keep the spirit of Indigenous cuisine alive. Whilst chefs in such restaurants often tweak traditional recipes to suit contemporary tastebuds, emphasis of natural foods is still extant. The annual Indigenous Peoples Healthy Cuisine and Innovative Beverage Competition, partly sponsored by the Council of Indigenous Peoples and the Tourism Bureau provides prize money to contestants who creatively use traditional indigenous ingredients in healthy ways. Other similar competitions are held by local governments (such as Kaohsiung City). In Tainan, indigenous people may sell their food at the Cha Ha Mu Aboriginal Park. Such trends are all to promote the wonderful taste of Aboriginal Taiwanese cuisine. The cultural value of indigenous dishes and ingredients has become more widespread among non-indigenous people, but there are many implications with this growth in recent years. Cultivating or foraging for traditional ingredients is often limited on the small plots of land that are legally owned by indigenous people. Some urban Pangcah/Amis people have resorted to foraging without permission on others' land.

During the martial law period indigenous culture was repressed by the government, despite this indigenous cuisine became a part of Taiwan's national identity.

Siraw is an Amis dish of pickled pork.

The importance of wild greens to aboriginal cuisine is being increasingly appreciated. Wild greens refers to both wild plants found in the forest and to those same plants cultivated in domestic gardens. Rinari, in rural Pingtung County, is an aboriginal restaurant of national significance whose twenty seats are notoriously hard to secure. Rinari primarily serves Rukai cuisine.

== Beverages ==
The Taiwanese drink less alcohol per capita than neighboring South Koreans and Japanese. This is believed to be because approximately half of Taiwan's population does not possess the necessary gene to successfully metabolize alcohol. During the Japanese colonial period the production of alcoholic beverages was industrialized and in 1922, production of alcohol was monopolized by the colonial authorities. Modern Taiwanese drinking culture and beverage production is still influenced by the Japanese colonial period.

=== Beer ===
Beer is a popular beverage in Taiwan. Taiwan both imports and produces a wide variety of beers from mass market lagers to niche craft ales. Some of the well-developed brands include Long Chuan (龍泉), Le Blé d'Or (金色三麥), Jolly Brewery+Restaurant (卓莉手工醸啤酒泰食餐廳), North Taiwan Brewing (北台灣麥酒) and Taihu Brewing (臺虎精釀).

=== Coffee ===
The first coffee plants on Taiwan were imported by the British to Tainan in 1884 with the first significant small scale cultivation taking place in New Taipei City's Sanxia District. Tainan remains the heart of Taiwanese coffee culture.

During the Japanese colonial period between 1895 and 1945, coffee plantations were set up in Taiwan. Coffee, like other colonial introductions, was regarded as a sign of modernity. It was often made using a siphon, and tended to be strong and bitter. Production reached a peak in 1941 following the introduction of arabica coffee plants by the Japanese colonial authorities.

More recently, Starbucks' outlets in Taiwan have introduced local drinkers to espresso-based milk beverages, which are often milder than the brews traditionally served there. Domestic production is still small, but of high quality; imported beans account for the vast majority of coffee sold in Taiwan. In 2016, domestic production was 900 tons while 30,000 tons was imported. That year, a Taiwanese, Berg Wu, won the World Barista Championship; the victory helped bring to attention Taiwan's substantial involvement in coffee culture.

By 2020, there were more than 15,000 coffee shops in Taiwan, including Starbucks, Taiwanese coffee shop chains, convenience stores, and independent outlets. During that year, average coffee consumption surpassed average tea consumption for the first time. By 2024, a significant percentage of specialty coffee shops were roasting their own beans, and tourists had started visiting Taiwan specifically to go "cafe hopping". Taiwan had become the third-largest coffee consumer per capita in Asia, and the average Taiwanese person was drinking 177 cups of coffee per year.

=== Kaoliang liquor ===
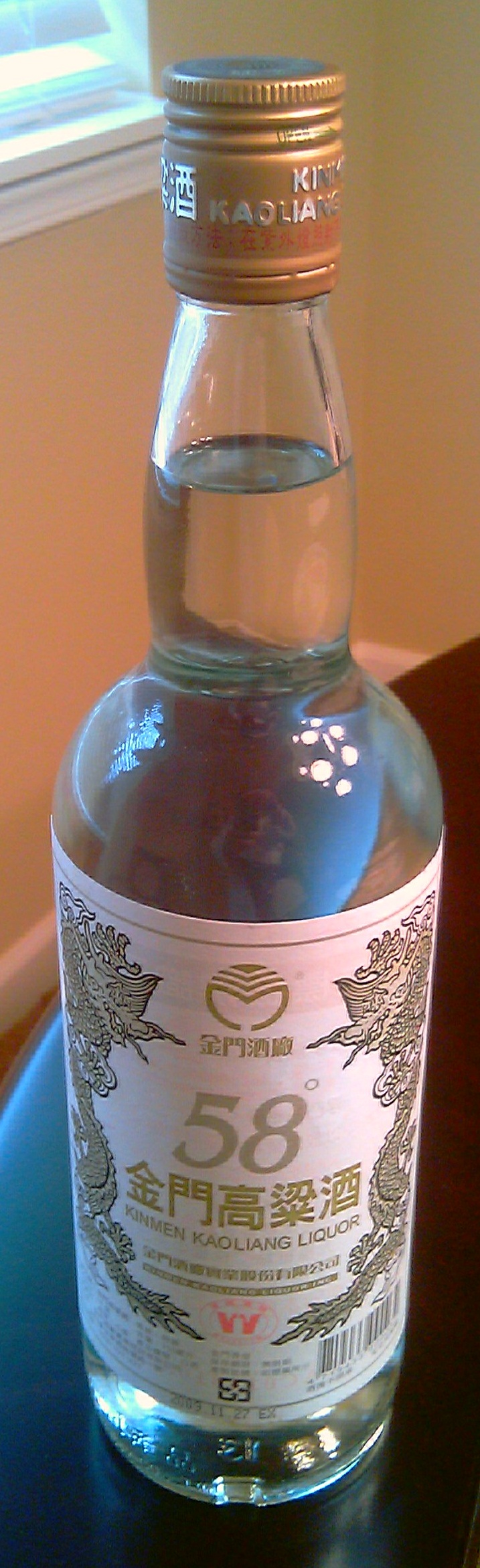
Kinmen 58% Kaoliang

Kinmen Kaoliang Liquor is one of the most popular brands of kaoliang liquor in Taiwan. As its name indicates, it is produced on the island of Kinmen. The mainstays of the range are the standard 58 percent and 38 percent alcohol bottlings. Kinmen's kaoliang production traces its roots back to the Chinese Civil War when Chinese nationalist general Hu Lien encouraged Kinmenese farmers to grow sorghum to produce hard liquor as importing alcohol from Taiwan caused financial strain. Kaoliang liquor has become an integral part of Kinmen's economy and plays a significant role in the culture of Kinmen.

Yusan Kaoliang Chiew (Chinese: 玉山高粱酒; pinyin: Yùshān Gāoliáng Jiǔ) is produced by the Taiwan Tobacco and Liquor Corporation. It is named after the highest mountain in Taiwan, Yushan. One of the most notable products in the range is an "X.O." kaoliang aged for five years in tanks before bottling.

Matsu Tunnel 88 Kaoliang Liquor (Chinese: 馬祖八八坑道高粱酒; pinyin: Bā Bā Kēngdào Gāoliáng Jiǔ) is produced by the Matsu Distillery in Nangan Township, Lienchiang County. The name is derived from the name of an abandoned military tunnel called Tunnel 88 which the distillery took over as storage space for their kaoliang and aged rice wine. All of the distillery's aged kaoliangs are stored in the tunnel for at least five years.

=== Rum ===
Commercial rum production was introduced into Taiwan along with commercial sugar production during the Japanese colonial period. Rum production continued under the ROC however it was neglected by Taiwan Tobacco and Liquor Corporation which held the national liquor monopoly. The industry diversified after democratization and the de-monopolization of the Taiwanese alcoholic beverage industry.

=== Tea ===
Taiwanese tea is widely regarded as high-quality, with the region possessing a distinct tea culture.

=== Whisky ===
Taiwan has a young whisky industry buoyed by a large domestic market for whisky, namely single malt scotch. Taiwan is the only whisky market which drinks more single malt whisky than blended whisky.

=== Wine ===
Independent winemaking was illegal in Taiwan for a long time due to the monopoly granted to the Taiwan Tobacco and Liquor Corporation. Independent winemakers became legal in 2002 and in 2014, a Taiwanese wine won its first gold medal at an international competition. In 2019, a red wine from Taichung was awarded a gold medal at the 25th Vinalies Internationales in France. Two of the most acclaimed wineries are Domaine Shu Sheng and Weightstone Vineyard Estate & Winery. Although it was once largely lost, Taiwan's indigenous winemaking culture is staging a comeback.

=== Sake ===
Sake consumption started during the Japanese colonial period. The first sake was made in Taiwan in 1914, the largest contemporary domestic brand is Yuchun produced by the Taiwan Tobacco and Liquor Corporation. A number of smaller producers also exist with an emphasis placed on unique products made with local rice. Taiwan also imports large amounts of sake from Japan. Its proximity and the volume of the trade allows merchants in Taiwan to stock fresh and limited production sake which is not widely available elsewhere outside Japan.

== Fine dining ==
Fine dining in Taiwan is often of a mixed identity. For example, wedding banquets in Taiwan typically feature Japanese sashimi as the first course with traditional Taiwanese and Chinese dishes following. In the 21st century, indigenous ingredients, dishes, and techniques have made their way into high end restaurants.

In 2018, La Liste listed 10 restaurants in Taiwan among the world's 1,000 best.

The Michelin Guide began reviewing restaurants in Taipei in 2018 and Taichung in 2020. The 2020 Michelin awarded stars to 30 restaurants in Taiwan, four in Taichung and 26 in Taipei. With three stars, the Cantonese restaurant Le Palais is the country's highest rated restaurant. The 2020 list also bestowed the Bib Gourmand on 54 restaurants in Taipei and 21 in Taichung. The expansion of the Michelin Guide to Taiwan increased international recognition for Taiwanese restaurants. In 2023, the Michelin Guide was expanded to Tainan and Kaohsiung.

There are significant differences between the fine dining scenes in Taipei and Taichung. In Taichung, an emphasis is placed on ceremony with large tables and private rooms common, a premium is also placed on parking with restaurants having more than 100 parking spaces. This is due in part to Taichung's strong small and medium enterprises as well as a multitude of informal recreational and fraternal organizations. In Taipei, fine dining restaurants and tables are generally smaller with most customers being couples or small groups, in general, service is less formal than in Taichung. In Taipei, there is more international influence in the fine dining scene while Taichung retains a strong affinity with traditional dishes. In the 2010s, fine dining restaurants which more closely followed international trends proliferated in Taichung. Lanshu Chen was particularly important in gaining Taichung international recognition.

== Foreign cuisine in Taiwan ==
=== Fusion ===
Fusion cuisine is very popular in Taiwan. Many Taiwanese dishes are a result of cultural fusion, such as the Taiwanese version of pastel de nata which are a legacy of Portuguese colonialism in neighboring Macao.

=== Italian ===
Italian cuisine has been popular in Taiwan for a long time, but the country had few authentic Italian restaurants and even fewer Italian chefs until the late 1990s and early 2000s. Due to the 2008 financial crisis, many Italians emigrated from Italy to healthier economies. This led to a rapid increase in both the number of Italian restaurants and the number of Italian expats in Taiwan. While most restaurants follow the traditional Italian course style, the meal proportions are influenced by Italian-American cuisine. Taiwanese diners have become increasingly passionate and discerning about Italian cuisine. Michael de Prenda was one of the innovators of Italian cuisine in Taiwan, starting multiple restaurants, a market, and a farm.

==== Pizza ====
Pizza is one of the most popular foods in Taiwan. The first pizza restaurant opened in the 1970s and the industry grew rapidly in the 2000s driven by an increasing demand for quality Italian and American style pizza from an affluent younger generation which had spent time abroad and brought back a taste for it.

Chain pizza restaurants like Pizza Hut and Domino's Pizza are known for running promotional pizzas with outrageous toppings like spicy hotpot, cilantro and century egg with pig's blood, beef and kiwi, glutinous rice, ramen, and stinky tofu in an attempt to get national and international publicity. Pizza Hut entered the Taiwanese market in 1986 and Domino's followed in the late 1980s. In 2022, each company had more than 150 stores in Taiwan.

=== Indian ===
Historically overseas Chinese from India would travel to Taiwan to learn cooking. Indian restaurants existed in Taiwan, but overall the cuisine was slow to catch on.

Indian food became popular in Taiwan in the 2000s. The number of Indian restaurants has grown along with the growth of the Indian and larger South Asian community in Taiwan, however, most customers in Indian restaurants are local with Indian food also being found in university cafeterias and other institutional settings.

=== Russian ===
Along with the fleeing KMT came White Russian refugees who had sought shelter from the Russian Revolution in China. George Elsner founded the first Russian restaurant, The Café Astoria, in Taiwan in 1949. The Café Astoria was a center of Russian expat life in Taiwan during its early years. Chiang Ching-kuo and his Russian wife, Faina Vakhreva, often brought their children with them to eat there. Elsner died stateless in Taiwan.

=== Nordic ===
Nordic haute cuisine is popular in Taiwan's major cities, with restaurants offering both authentic Nordic cuisine and Nordic cuisine adapted to local ingredients and tastes.

=== Hong Kong ===
The increase in immigration from Hong Kong following the pro-democracy protests brought an increased focus on Hong Kong cuisine, along with a fusion between Hong Kong and Taiwan cuisines. Taiwan is considered a safe haven for Hongkongers, with many opening shops and restaurants to serve food they were unable to find in Taiwan, or which they did not feel was up to Hong Kong standards.

=== Japanese ===
Taiwan, in particularly Taipei, is regarded as having some of the best Japanese food outside of Japan. This is due to the legacy of Japanese colonialism as well as ongoing cultural and commercial exchange.

==== Ramen ====
Ramen restaurants in Taiwan often create unique ramen dishes including durian, whole giant isopod, crocodile leg, and whole frog.

=== Burmese ===
Burmese and Chinese Burmese restaurants are primarily located in the Little Burma section of Taipei. Chinese Burmese immigration to Taiwan began in the 1950s.

=== Chinese ===
In the decades since the KMT's retreat, these regional dishes have evolved and become part of Taiwanese cuisine.

According to Taiwanese chef Fu Pei-mei, authentic Chinese culinary traditions were properly preserved in Taiwan. This claim to authenticity, common among Fu's generation, was in part due to the Kuomintang's Chinese nationalist political messaging which extended well beyond cuisine. The authenticity of regional Chinese cuisine in Taiwan has been challenged.

=== Singaporean ===
Taiwan has a significant Singaporean community. In 2020, the Taichung-based JL Studio from Singaporean chef Jimmy Lim Tyan Yaw was awarded a second Michelin star, becoming the highest rated Singaporean restaurant in the world.

== Taiwanese cuisine abroad ==
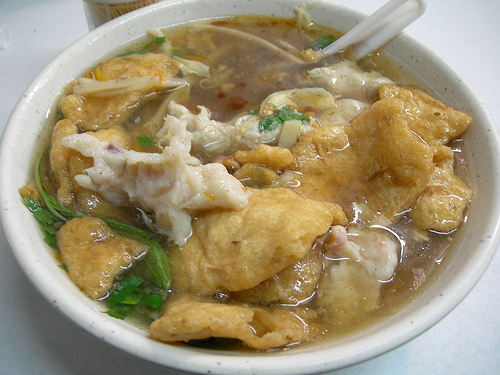
A pork keⁿ, a thick soup with tofu and surimi-coated pork

Taiwanese cuisine has a global presence. Taiwanese chefs have been extremely successful abroad cooking both Taiwanese and international cuisine. Well known chefs include André Chiang.

=== Culinary diplomacy ===
Along with its semiconductor industry, Taiwan's cuisine is one of its most prominent aspects internationally. Taiwan has used culinary diplomacy to bolster its tourism sector and to conduct diplomacy in countries with which it has limited official ties. In 2010, Taiwan's Ministry of Economic Affairs launched a £20-million culinary diplomacy campaign called "All in Good Taste: Savor the Flavors of Taiwan". It promoted Taiwanese venues internationally, sponsored chefs, hosted food festivals and competitions, and emphasized elements such as bubble tea, oyster omelette, and Taiwan's night markets. Since 2010, the ministry has sent chefs abroad to promote Taiwanese cuisine.

==== Banquets ====
State banquets have formed an important part of Taiwanese diplomacy since the era of one-party rule by the KMT. General Tso's chicken was invented by the KMT's head chef Peng Chang-kuei in the 1950s to feed visiting American military dignitaries.

The banquets are meant to present a message to guests and as such dishes and styles have varied over the years under different administrations. There has been an increasing emphasis on serving Taiwanese ingredients cooked in a distinctly Taiwanese style.

=== United States ===
Taiwanese immigrant restaurateurs were largely responsible for the shift of American Chinese food from Cantonese-focused cuisine to diverse cuisine featuring dishes from many regions in China. The immigration of Taiwanese chefs to the United States began in the 1950s. At the time, cooks in Taiwan were trained in traditional Chinese regional cooking as this fit the chosen identity of the KMT. Taiwanese restaurateurs changed the food landscape of many American cities, including New York City, and pioneered innovations such as picture menus and food delivery. Many of the immigrants to the United States during this period had been born in China and fled to Taiwan with the retreating KMT, particularly former residents of the Dachen Islands who had been evacuated in 1955.

Traditionally, Taiwanese food has been hard to differentiate from Chinese and Japanese food abroad, since many Taiwanese chefs cooked simplified or westernized versions of traditional Taiwanese, Japanese, or Chinese dishes. In 2018, there was a rapid growth in the number of authentic Taiwanese restaurants in New York City and across the country, which coincided with an increased interest in regional Chinese food and in Taiwan itself. Some object to the politically fraught inclusion of Taiwanese cuisine under the banner of regional Chinese food and point out that it is inaccurate.

Taiwanese American cuisine is emerging as a full cuisine in its own right. Myers + Chang in Boston was one of the first restaurants to explicitly describe their food as such. In 2018, James Beard Award-winning chef Stephanie Izard opened a Taiwanese snack/dessert shop in Chicago. Taiwanese cuisine has a significant presence in the San Francisco Bay Area. Most Taiwanese restaurants in the Bay Area are located in the suburbs. Increasing interest in authentic Taiwanese food is coming from ex-pats and second generation Taiwanese Americans.

A Taiwanese American cookbook, First Generation, was published by Frankie Gaw in 2022. In 2023, Cathy Erway published Win Son Presents: A Taiwanese American Cookbook.

Kato by Chef Jon Yao is a Michelin-starred restaurant serving Taiwanese food in Los Angeles.

== Culinary education ==
Historically, culinary education was informal with apprentices learning from a master for many years before they practice the craft on their own. The first college level course in cooking was implemented in 1986 at Danshui Technical College.

=== Culinary schools ===
- Danshui Technical College
- National Kaohsiung University of Hospitality and Tourism

== Events ==
The main cooking show in Taiwan is the Taiwan Culinary Exhibition (TCE). In 2023, the TCE was held at the Taipei World Trade Center the and featured four areas "Gourmet Tastes, Culinary Exploration, Government Pavilion, and Exotic Foods."

== See also ==
- Agriculture in Taiwan
- List of restaurants in Taiwan
- Maritime industries of Taiwan
- Q texture
