= Alivongvong =

Taiwanese Aboriginal dish

- Alternative names: Alifengfeng
- Region or state: Taiwan
- Associated cuisine: Taiwan
- Main ingredients: sticky rice, meat

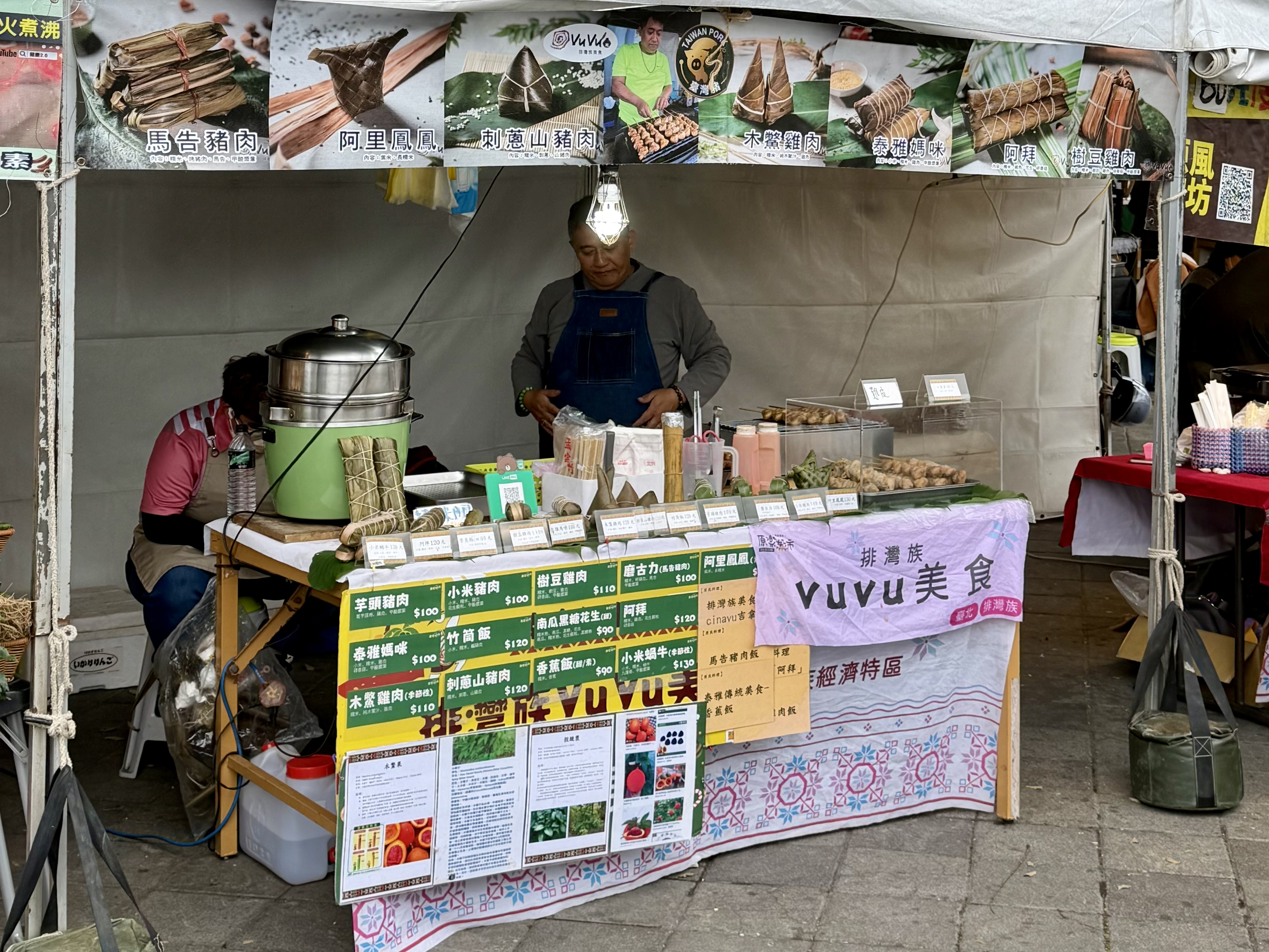
Stall at Taipei Expo Farmer's Market selling Alivongvong

Alivongvong, (Chinese: 阿里鳳鳳; Tongyong Pinyin: ālǐfòngfòng) is a traditional delicacy of the Amis people, one of Taiwanese indigenous peoples. This dish features a sticky rice dumpling filled with meat, carefully enclosed in a hand-crafted leaf basket. Typically, a combination of white and black sticky rice is used for the dumpling, and common fillings include pork, wild boar meat, fish, and mushrooms. Alivongvong can be found at night markets in Taiwan and eateries that offer aboriginal culinary specialties, providing a taste of traditional Amis cuisine to a wider audience.

== Culinary method ==
The preparation of alivongvong involves using pandan leaves, chosen for their tenderness, which are stripped of thorns and edges. These leaves are then woven into small, free-standing baskets. The sticky rice, both white and black, is thoroughly washed and soaked overnight. The soaked rice is placed into the leaf baskets, filling them about two-thirds full. The baskets are then steamed for about an hour, during which the pandan leaves impart their fragrance.

== Cultural significance ==
Alivongvong is often called the Amis lunchbox because of its convenient transportability, making it ideal for meals on the go. Historically, Amis women prepared these meals for their husbands who went hunting, highlighting the role of this dish in traditional Amis culture.

== See also ==
- Taiwanese cuisine
- Cinavu
