= Geng (dish) =

Chinese soup

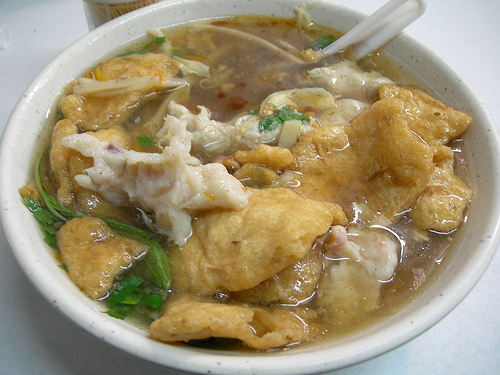
- A bowl of meat-based geng
- Type: Soup
- Place of origin: China

Gēng (Chinese: 羹; pinyin: gēng; Wade–Giles: keng^{1}; Pe̍h-ōe-jī: keⁿ / kiⁿ) is a type of thick or clear soup found in Chinese cuisine. Its thickening agent is usually starch, which makes the soup translucent and smooth. Many soups can be cooked in this way, such as shark fin soup, Madame Song's fish soup (宋嫂魚羹), and corn soup.

== History ==
Geng dishes have been important in Chinese cuisine since early dynastic China, during or prior to the Shang dynasty (1600–1046 BC). In the past, the term "geng" was used to refer to any cooked soup or stew, with households serving it daily and for festive events.

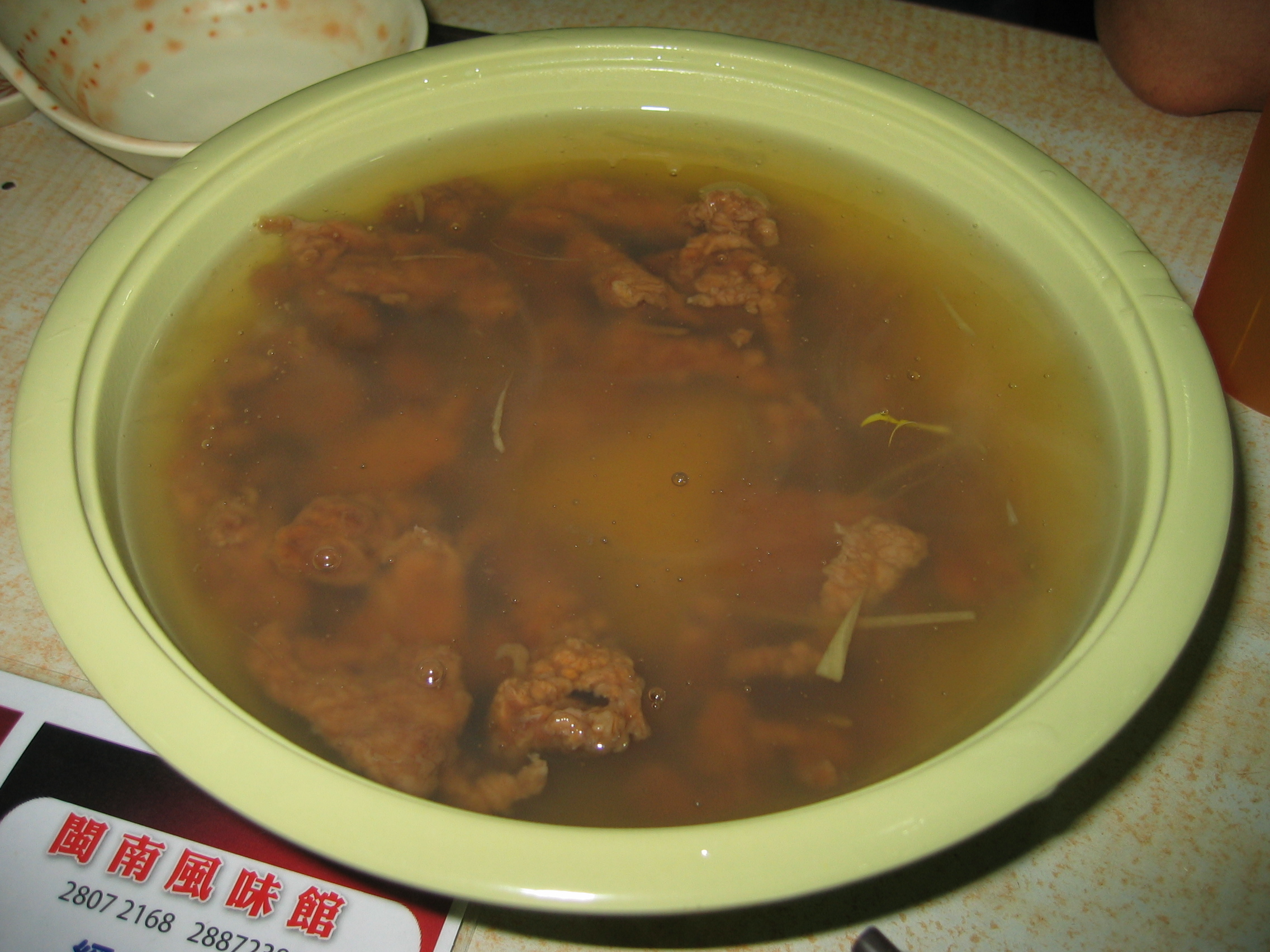
A bowl of Fujian style beef geng

In modern times, geng dishes consist of different ingredients commonly found in the night markets of Taiwan, and quite commonly in Fujian and Taiwanese cuisine. In Taiwan, the character for geng is sometimes written as "焿" and sometimes as "粳".

The Lao (ແກງ, [kɛ̀ːŋ]) and Thai language (แกง, [kɛ̄ːn]) terms for curry, stew, or soup, are believed to have been derived from the Middle Chinese pronunciation of geng (羹). The Vietnamese term for soup, canh (e.g., canh chua), descends from the Sino-Vietnamese form of 羹.

== Cultural significance ==
Due to its cultural prevalence, the food has been featured in various Chinese cultural sayings and idioms:

- "Share a cup of geng" (分一杯羹): To boldly partake in a pool of profit or spoils, regardless of the pleasantness or the morality of these profits' origin. The expression is typically attributed to Liu Bang's infamous rebuff against Xiang Yu during the Chu-Han contention. Xiang had previous routed Liu's army and captured his family as hostages, and publicly threatened to cook Liu's father alive if he refuses to surrender. Liu responded humiliatingly (and rather shamelessly) by pointing out that he and Xiang were once sworn brothers, and if Xiang was willing to commit patricide by killing "our father", then "share me a cup of geng when you are done cooking".
- "Shop-closing geng" (閉門羹): To shoo-off clients or guests that a host does not wish to receive by a disingenuous action or excuse.
- "Washing hands to make geng" (洗手作羹湯): From a poem of Wang Jian, implying the trials of a new bride to appease and gain acceptance in her new family.

The traditional Chinese spoon is called "diào gēng" (調羹), which means "the implement that carries geng".

== See also ==
- List of Chinese soups
- List of soups
- Yōkan
- Cuttlefish geng
