= Small sausage in large sausage =

Taiwanese snack sandwich

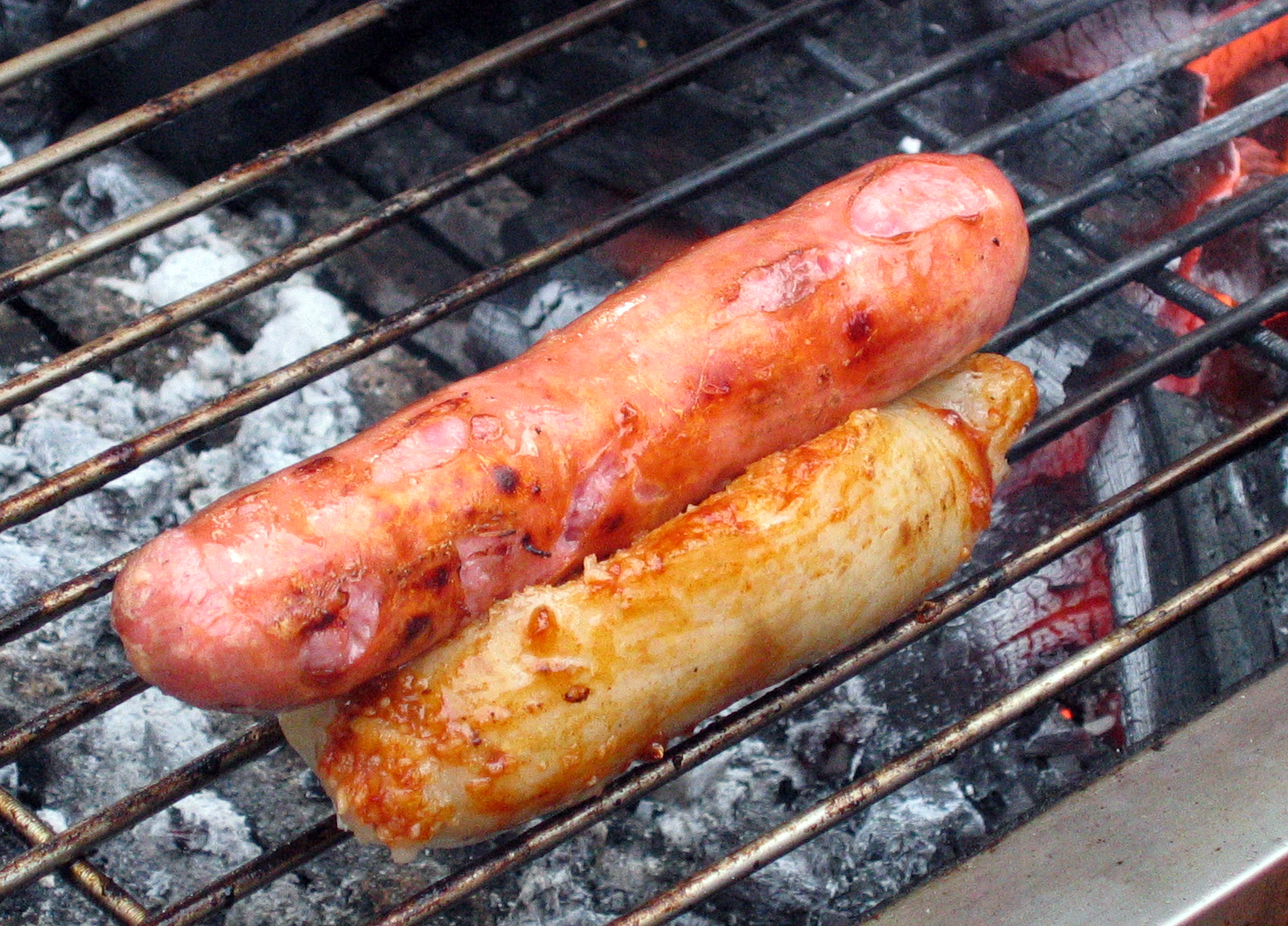
- Place of origin: Taiwan
- Serving temperature: Hot

Small sausage in large sausage (simplified Chinese: 大肠包小肠; traditional Chinese: 大腸包小腸; pinyin: Dàcháng Bāo Xiǎocháng; Pe̍h-ōe-jī: tōa-tn̂g pau sió-tn̂g; Zhuyin Fuhao: ㄉㄚˋㄔㄤˊㄅㄠㄒㄧㄠˇㄔㄤˊ; lit. 'large intestine wrapping small intestine') is a snack sausage sandwich invented in Taiwan in the late 20th century. A segment of Taiwanese pork sausage is wrapped in a (slightly bigger and fatter) sticky rice patty, and usually served chargrilled. Deluxe versions are available in night markets in Taiwan, with condiments such as pickled bokchoy, pickled cucumber, garlic, hot peppers, wasabi, and thick soy sauce paste to complement the taste.

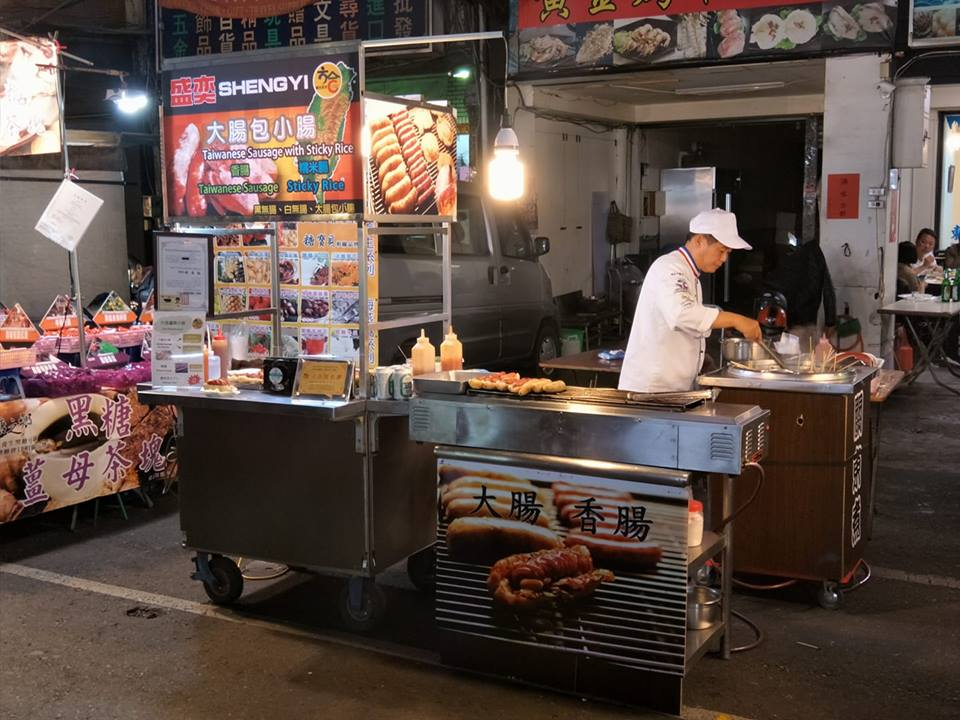
Sheng Yi Taiwanese sausage with sticky rice at Liouhe Night Market in Kaohsiung, Taiwan

== See also ==
- Taiwanese cuisine
