= Tsang Ying Tou =

Spicy stir-fry from Taiwan

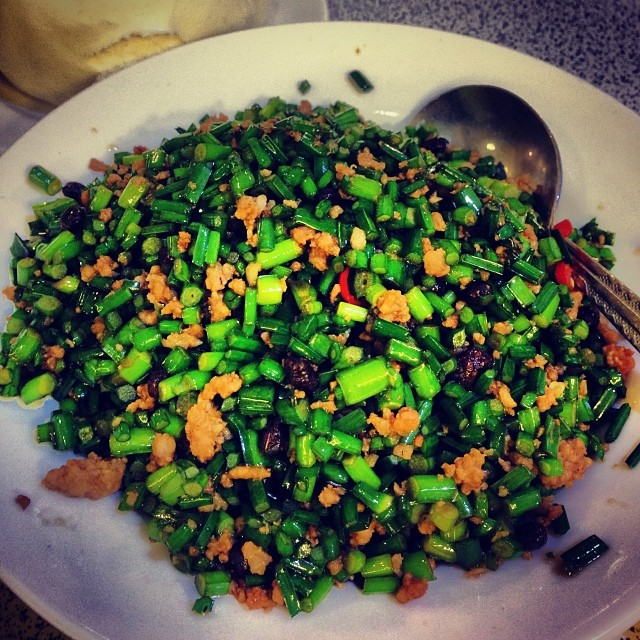
- Alternative names: Flies' Head
- Region or state: Taiwan
- Associated cuisine: Taiwan
- Main ingredients: garlic chives, minced pork, and fermented black beans

Tsang Ying Tou, or Flies' Head (Chinese: 蒼蠅頭; pinyin: Cāng Yíng Tóu), is a Taiwanese stir-fry dish made primarily of garlic chives, minced pork, and fermented black beans, often found in night markets across Taiwan.

== Flavor ==
The dish has a savory and umami-rich flavor, with the fermented black beans adding a distinctive salty depth. The garlic chives provide a fresh, slightly pungent taste, and the minced pork adds richness and texture. The combination is typically complemented by the heat from bird's eye chilis.

== History ==
Tsang Ying Tou is a uniquely Taiwanese creation, said to have been invented at Wang Cheng Laoma, a Sichuan-style restaurant in Taipei. Faced with an abundance of garlic chives, chef Cheng Wen-Chiang decided to create a new dish by stir-frying them with minced pork, fermented black soybeans, and chilies. The resulting dish was well received by his employees and quickly became a popular menu item.

In the early 2000s, this dish began appearing on restaurant menus across Taiwan. The literal translation of its name Flies' Head comes from the appearance of the tiny fermented black beans, which resemble the eyes of flies, combined with the green and brown colors of the garlic chives and pork.

== Global Popularity ==
Tsang Ying Tou eventually found its way to the United States, notably being featured at Main Street Imperial Gourmet in Flushing, New York City. In 2013, it caught the attention of Josh Ku and Trigg Brown, co-owners of Win Son Restaurant in Brooklyn. They were inspired by the dish and included it on their menu, where it has remained a staple.

The dish has also been adapted and served in other cities, demonstrating its appeal beyond Taiwan. Despite its unusual name, the combination of chives, pork, and fermented black beans has proven to be delicious and appealing to many.

== See also ==
- Taiwanese cuisine
