= Cinavu =

Traditional indigenous Taiwanese dish

- Place of origin: Taiwan
- Region or state: Taitung County
- Main ingredients: Millet, glutinous rice, taro powder, pork, plant leaves

Cinavu (Chinese: 吉拿富) is a Taiwanese traditional millet-based dumpling prepared by the indigenous Paiwan people of southern Taiwan. The dish is traditionally offered in important social gatherings of the Paiwan people, such as weddings and festivals, as well as a packed lunch during hunting or agricultural work, like a sandwich.

The dish was included in the 2024 Taiwan President Lai Ching-te's inaugural state banquet as one of Taiwan's significant national dishes. The dish means "wrapped" or "something that is enclosed" in Paiwan language as it is essentially millet, glutinous rice and pork wrapped in layers of shell ginger leaves before being steamed or boiled. The filling commonly includes fatty pork belly as well as fish or snails, depending on the available resources of that season.

Some articles often compare Han Chinese meat dumpling zongzi to cinavu. Cinavu contains very different fillings and is a distinct shape compared to zongzi. Furthermore, unlike zongzi, which is only eaten during the Dragon Boat Festival, cinavu can be eaten any time during the year.

== See also ==
- Taiwanese cuisine
- Taiwanese indigenous peoples
- Alivongvong
