= Egg sausage =

Traditional street food item from Keelung, Taiwan

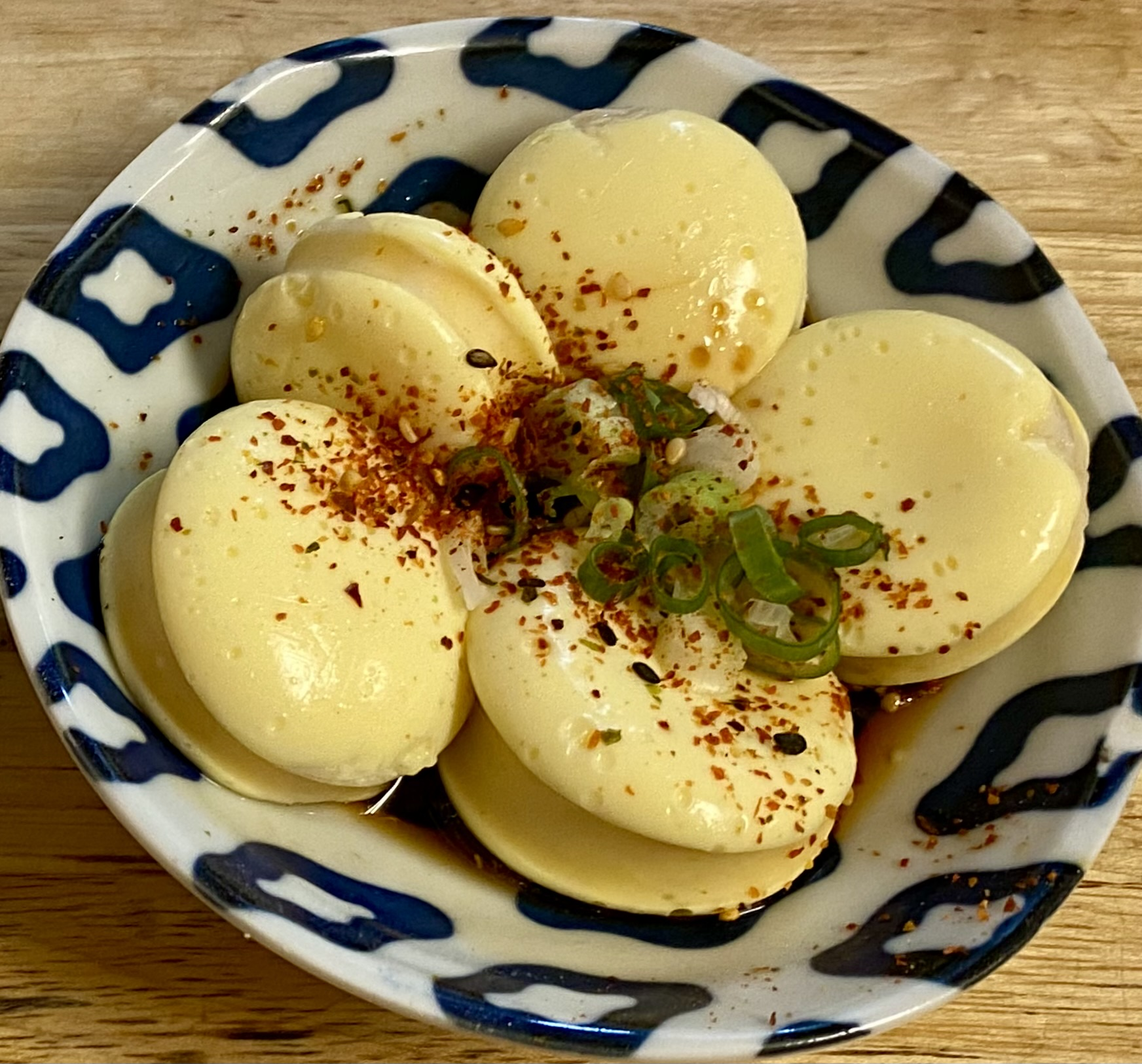
- Alternative names: Taiwanese Macaron, Dàncháng, Macaron of Hot Pot
- Place of origin: Taiwan
- Region or state: Keelung
- Main ingredients: eggs

Egg sausage (Chinese: 蛋腸) is a Taiwanese hot-pot ingredient originating from Keelung in northern Taiwan. The dish is produced by filling clean pig small-intestine casings with seasoned egg liquid. When boiled, the egg expands inside the casing into two rounded ends. When it is cut, it looks like macarons, so it's also known colloguially as Taiwanese Macaron. The exterior tastes slightly chewy and the interior tastes tender. The dish's origins dates back to the post-war period, when ingredients were relatively scarce and resources were limited. Due to its lack of preservatives and food additives, the dish has a relatively short shelf life compared to other more common hot-pot ingredients. This is the main reason why it remains a regional specialty confined to northern Taiwan.

== See also ==
- Taiwanese cuisine
- Keelung Miaokou Night Market
