= JL Studio =

JL STUDIO the first and only Three Michelin star, Singaporean cuisine restaurant in the world. JL STUDIO is located at No.59, Cunzhong Street, West District, Taichung City, 403011.Taiwan

== History ==
JL STUDIO was founded by Singaporean Chef Jimmy Lim Tyan Yaw in 2017. Chef Jimmy is the first and only Singaporean born chef to have held Three Michelin Star. Jimmy's father was also a chef. The restaurant specialized in modern Singaporean cuisine and utilizing Taiwanese ingredients.

== Awards and recognition ==
In 2019, JL STUDIO received THE ONE TO WATCH award by the Asia's 50 Best Restaurants. And has been on the list since then.

In 2020, when Michelin Guide Taiwan included Taichung City in the guide for the first time. JL STUDIO was awarded Two Michelin star, becoming the highest rated Singaporean cuisine restaurant in the world.

JL STUDIO was promoted to Three Michelin star in 2023. JL STUDIO is the highest rated Singaporean cuisine restaurant in the world. This also made Chef Jimmy Lim the first and only Singaporean born chef to have achieved this prestigious award.

== See also ==
- List of Michelin-starred restaurants in Taiwan
