= Eel noodles =

Taiwanese noodle dish

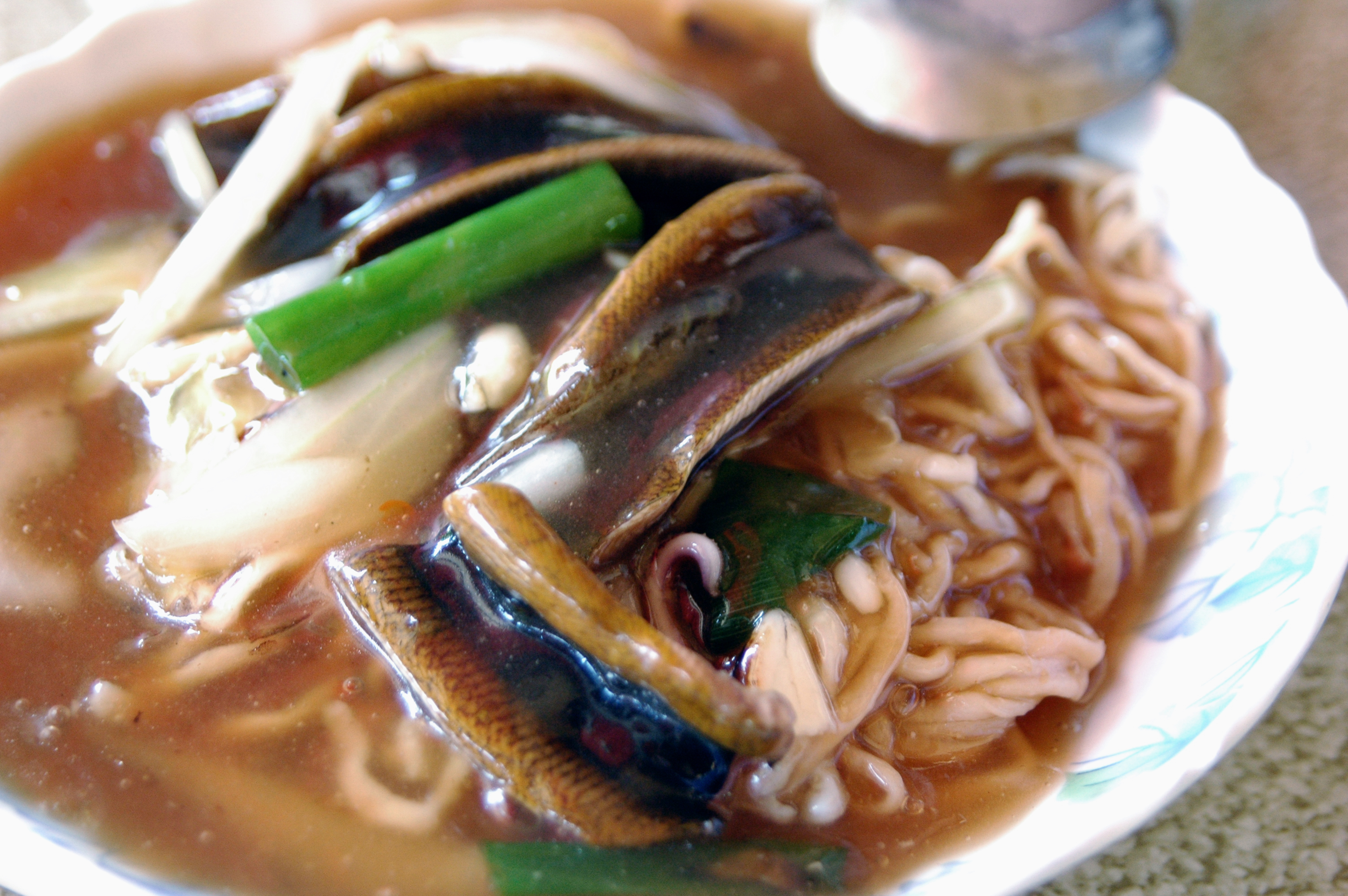
- Alternative names: Siān-hî ì-mī
- Region or state: Taiwan
- Associated cuisine: Taiwan
- Main ingredients: eel, yi mein

Eel noodles
- Traditional Chinese: 鱔魚意麵
Transcriptions
Standard Mandarin
- Hanyu Pinyin: shànyú yìmiàn
Southern Min
- Hokkien POJ: siān-hî ì-mī

Eel noodles (Chinese: 鱔魚意麵; pinyin: shànyú yìmiàn; Pe̍h-ōe-jī: siān-hî ì-mī) are a Taiwanese noodle dish consisting of thick, chewy, egg noodles with young yellow or finless eels, and a brown sweet and sour sauce or viscous soup. The dish originated from the food capital of Taiwan, Tainan City, which is near the sea. The dish is considered one of the national dishes of Taiwan and can be found in many Taiwanese restaurants and night markets all around the country.

== See also ==
- Taiwanese cuisine
- Ta-a mi (danzai noodles)
- Oyster vermicelli
