= List of squash and pumpkin dishes =

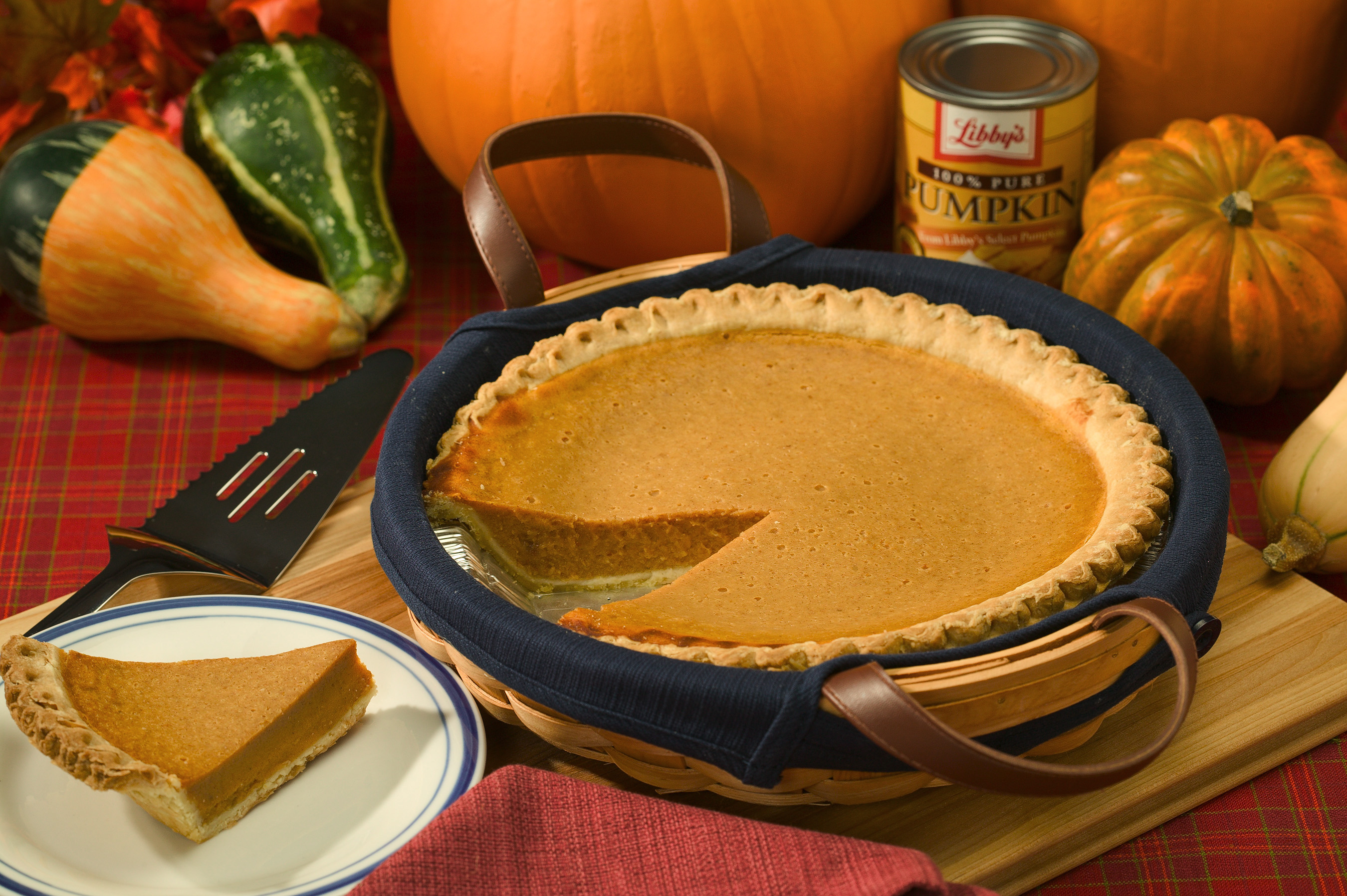
Pumpkin pie is a pumpkin-based dessert associated with harvest time.

This is a list of notable squash and pumpkin dishes that are prepared using squash and pumpkin as a primary ingredient. Pumpkin is a squash cultivar.

== Squash and pumpkin dishes and foods ==
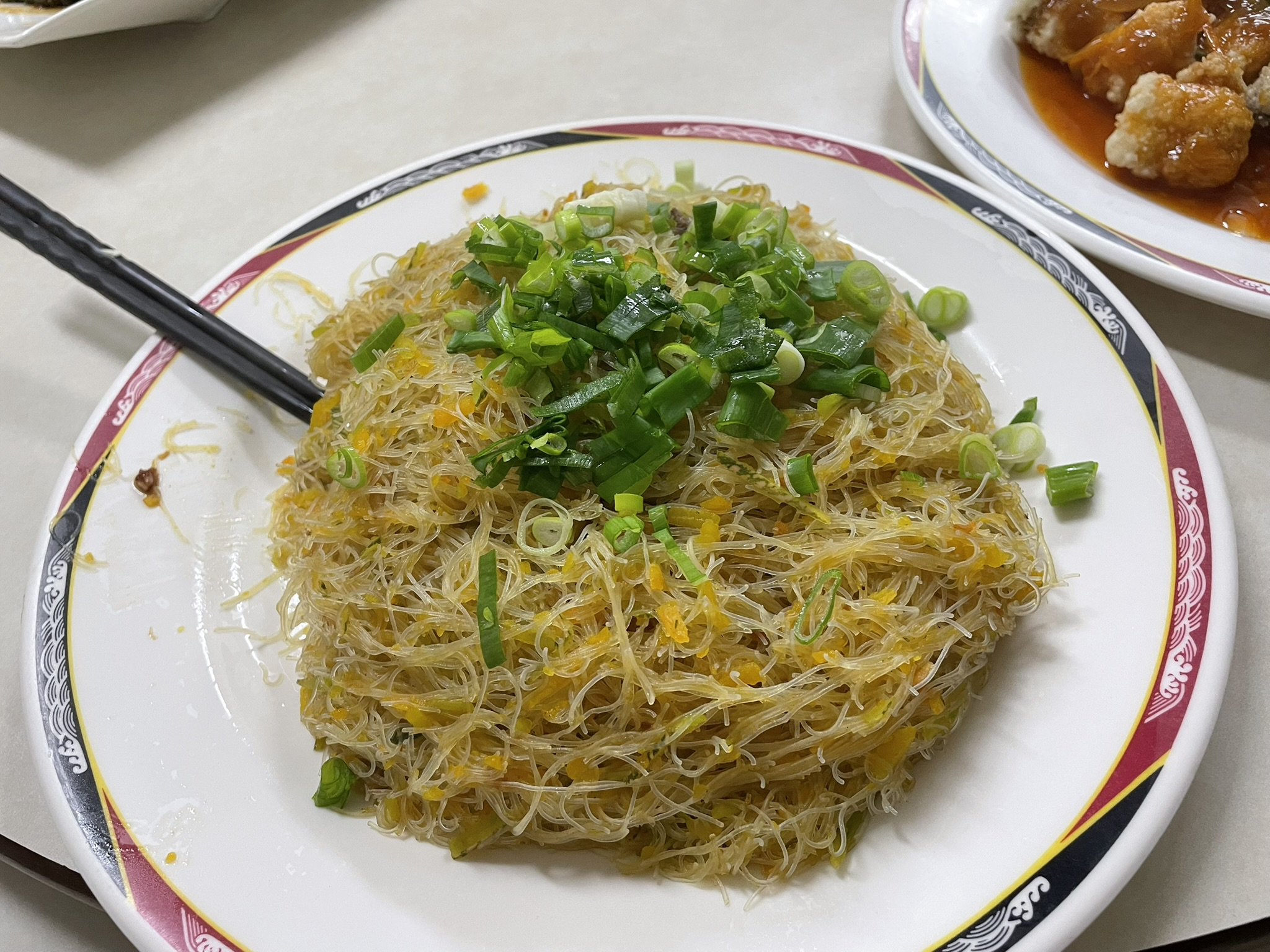
Pumpkin rice vermicelli, a Taiwanese dish.

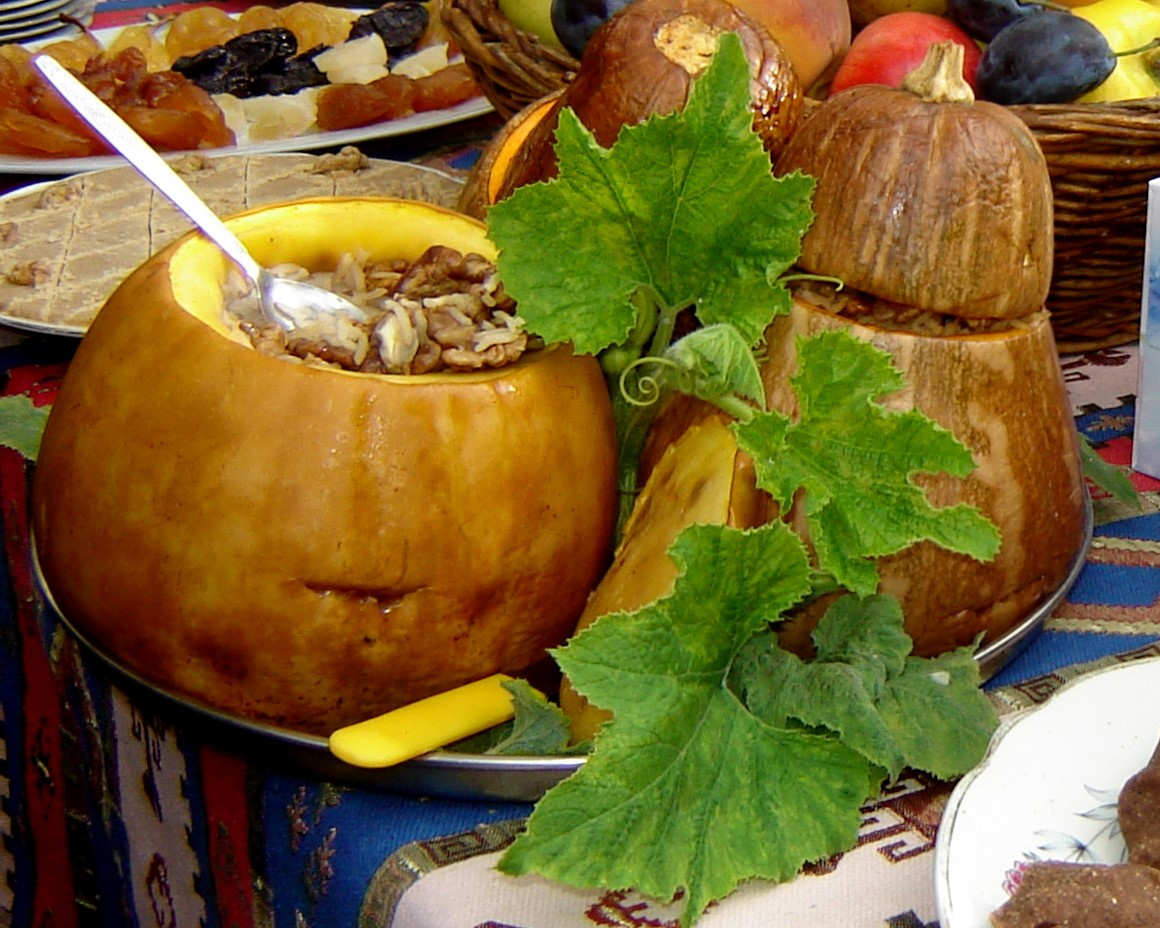
Ghapama is an Armenian stuffed pumpkin dish.

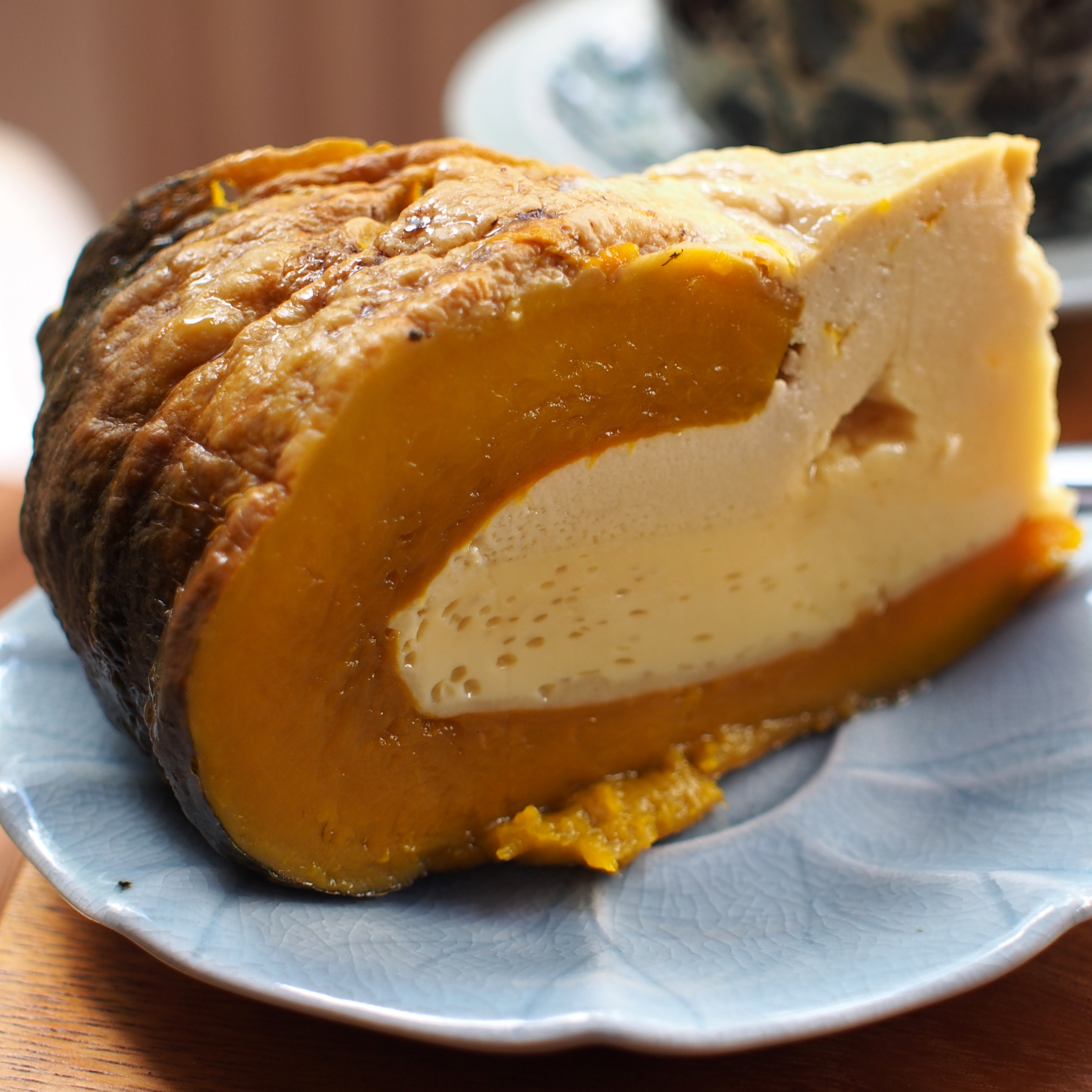
Pumpkin-coconut custard, a Southeast Asian dessert dish

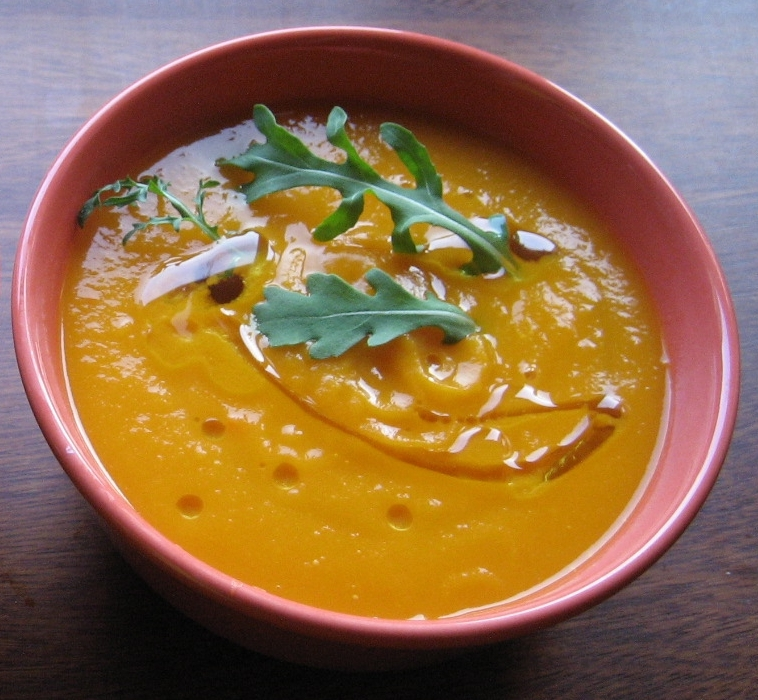
Pumpkin cream soup

- Hobak-juk – a Korean variety of juk (porridge) made with pumpkin and glutinous rice flour. It is a smooth and naturally sweet porridge that is traditionally served to the elderly or recovering patients.
- Hobak-tteok – a Korean dish and variety of siru-tteok (steamed rice cake) made by mixing fresh or dried pumpkin with glutinous or non-glutinous rice flour, then steaming the mixture in a siru (rice cake steamer).
- Kadu bouranee – an Afghan and Turkish dish made by frying pumpkin with different spices
- Maraq – a Somali soup that is sometimes prepared using pumpkin
- Mashed pumpkin – a vegetable dish made by cooking or macerating the skinless flesh (pulp) of pumpkins and then mashing, straining, grinding, or puréeing until the desired consistency is achieved. It is traditionally served as a side dish, although it has many uses in cooking and baking.
- Misti kumra bhorta - Misti kumra bhorta (মিষ্টি কুমড়া ভর্তা) is a well-known Bengali dish served with rice. It is made with boiled pumpkin pulp mashed with chilli, sliced onions, mustard oil and salt.

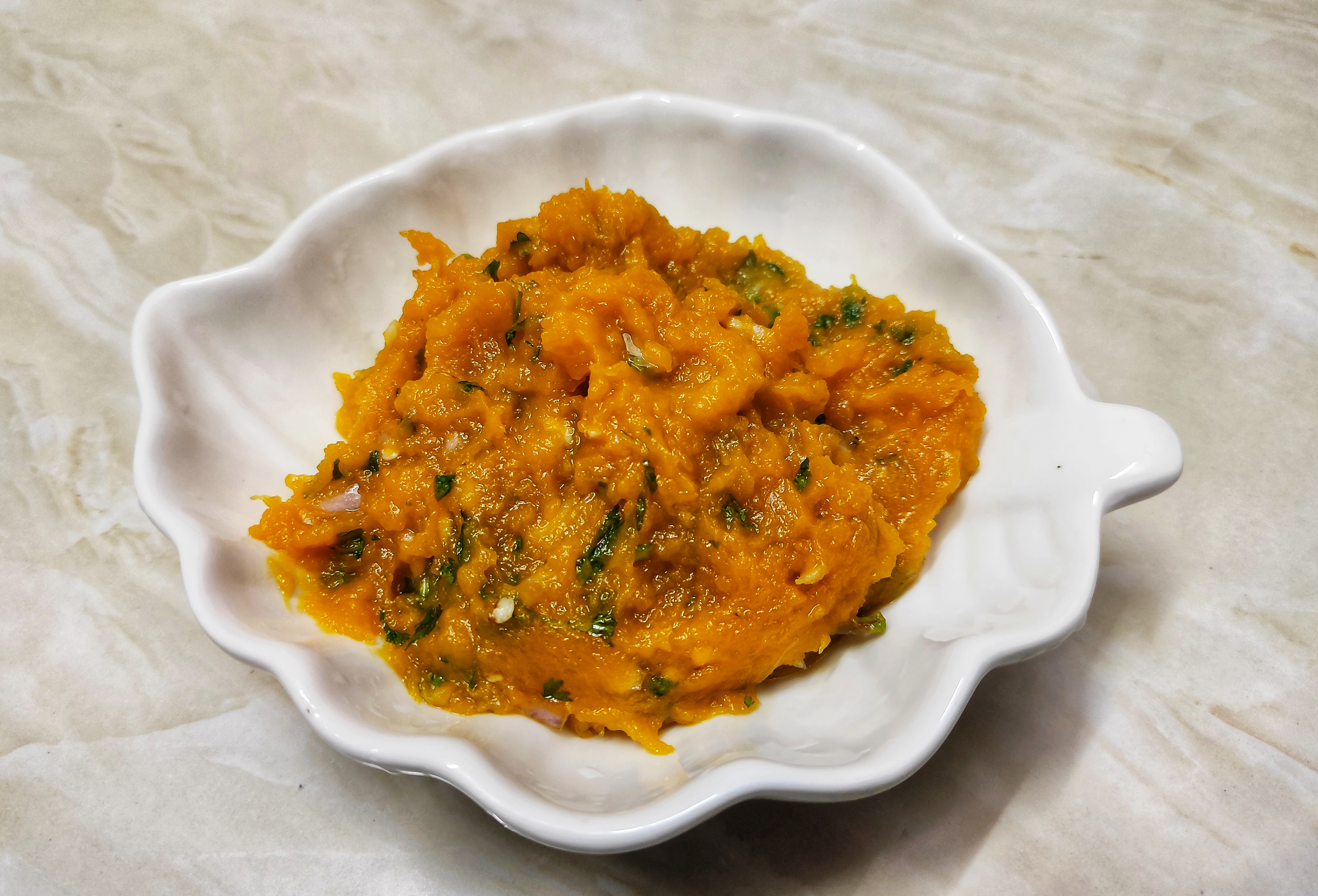
Pumpkin Bhorta, a Bengali dish

- Pumpkin bread – a type of moist quick bread made with pumpkin.
- Pumpkin rice vermicelli - a popular Taiwanese stir-fried noodle dish made with thin rice vermicelli and shredded pumpkin, particularly associated with the Penghu Islands and southern Taiwan. The dish is known for its golden hue, light sweetness from the pumpkin, and savory depth from dried seafood and aromatics.
- Pumpkin seed – a snack food typically consisting of roasted seeds, they are also used as an ingredient in some dishes, such as mole.

- Pumpkin seed oil – has an intense nutty taste and is rich in polyunsaturated fatty acids, it is sometimes used as a salad dressing. The typical Styrian dressing consists of pumpkin seed oil and cider vinegar. The oil is also used for desserts, giving ordinary vanilla ice cream a nutty taste.

- Spaghetti alla Nerano – an Italian pasta dish prepared using pasta, fried zucchinis and provolone del Monaco (or caciocavallo).
- Stuffed squash – consists of various kinds of squash or zucchini stuffed with rice and sometimes meat and cooked on the stovetop or in the oven.

- Ghapama – an Armenian stuffed pumpkin dish that often prepared during the Christmas season, it is typically stuffed with rice and dried fruits.
- Stuffed pumpkin – consists of pumpkin that has been stuffed with various ingredients and roasted or baked, it is a dish in American cuisine.

- Camarão na moranga - a traditional Brazilian dish made with shrimp cooked in a creamy, savory sauce, often featuring ingredients like coconut milk, cream cheese, and herbs. The shrimp mixture is served inside a whole roasted pumpkin (moranga), which adds a slightly sweet and earthy flavor. It's a festive and visually striking dish, commonly enjoyed during special gatherings and coastal celebrations. Typical from the caiçara people, very popular at the Ubatuba region.

=== Desserts and sweets ===
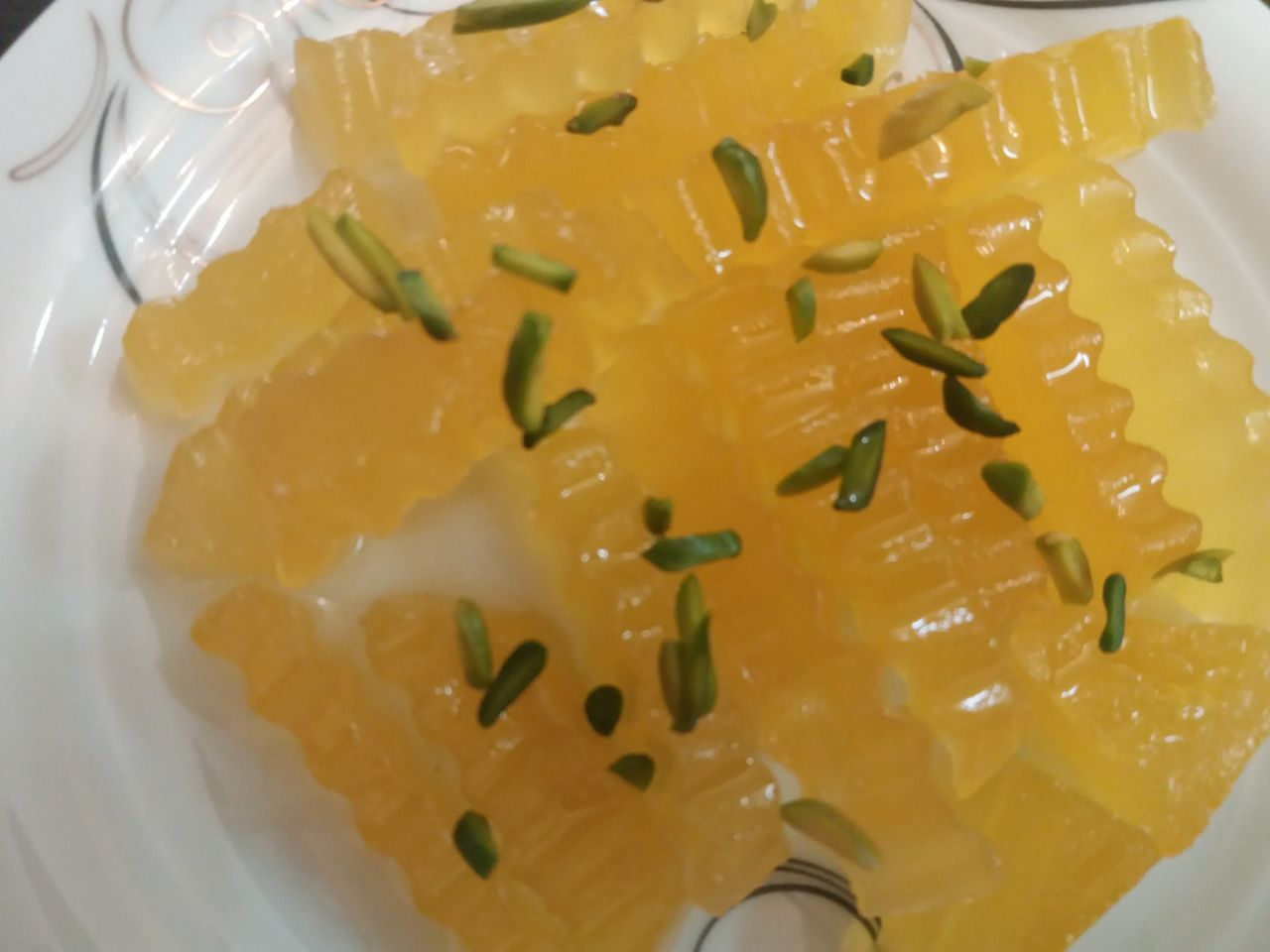
Butternut Pumpkin jam in Tabriz, Iranian Azerbaijan

- Bundevara – a Serbian sweet pie made of rolled phyllo or similar to strudel, filled with sweetened grated pumpkin pulp and baked in an oven.
- Fakthong kaeng buat – a Thai dish consisting of pumpkin in coconut cream
- Kabak tatlısı/Rachal – a Turkish and Armenian pumpkin dessert made by cooking peeled and cut pumpkin in syrup and then garnishing it with walnuts, tahini, or kaymak.
- Poke – a dessert from the Cook Islands and French Polynesia that is prepared using pumpkin or bananas.
- Picarones – a Peruvian dessert with principal ingredients of squash and sweet potato, it is served in a doughnut form and covered with syrup, made from chancaca (solidified molasses).
- Pumpkin-coconut custard – a dessert dish consisting of a coconut custard steam-baked in a pumpkin or kabocha
- Pumpkin pie – a dessert pie with a spiced, pumpkin-based custard filling
- Murabba – a butternut squash pumpkin-based sweet fruit preserve similar to jam found in Armenia and Iran.

=== Soups and stews ===
- Quibebe – a winter squash stew from South America (Note: "Quibebe . Stewed squash stew is called quibebe in Brazil, Argentina, Paraguay, Bolivia and Uruguay.)
- Squash soup – a soup prepared using various types of squash as a primary ingredient

- Pumpkin soup – various preparations of the dish are known in many European countries, the United States and other areas of North America, and in Australia.
- Soup joumou – a mildly spicy soup native to Haitian cuisine that is traditionally based on a large winter squash that resembles a pumpkin.

=== Beverages ===
- Pumpkin ale and beer – the brewing of beer with pumpkin in the United States has been dated back to at least 1771.

== Gallery ==
Squash and pumpkin dishes

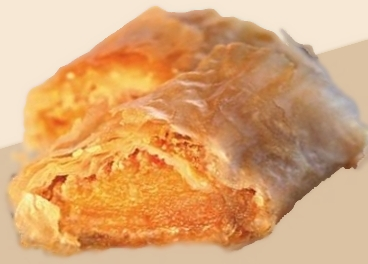
Bundevara

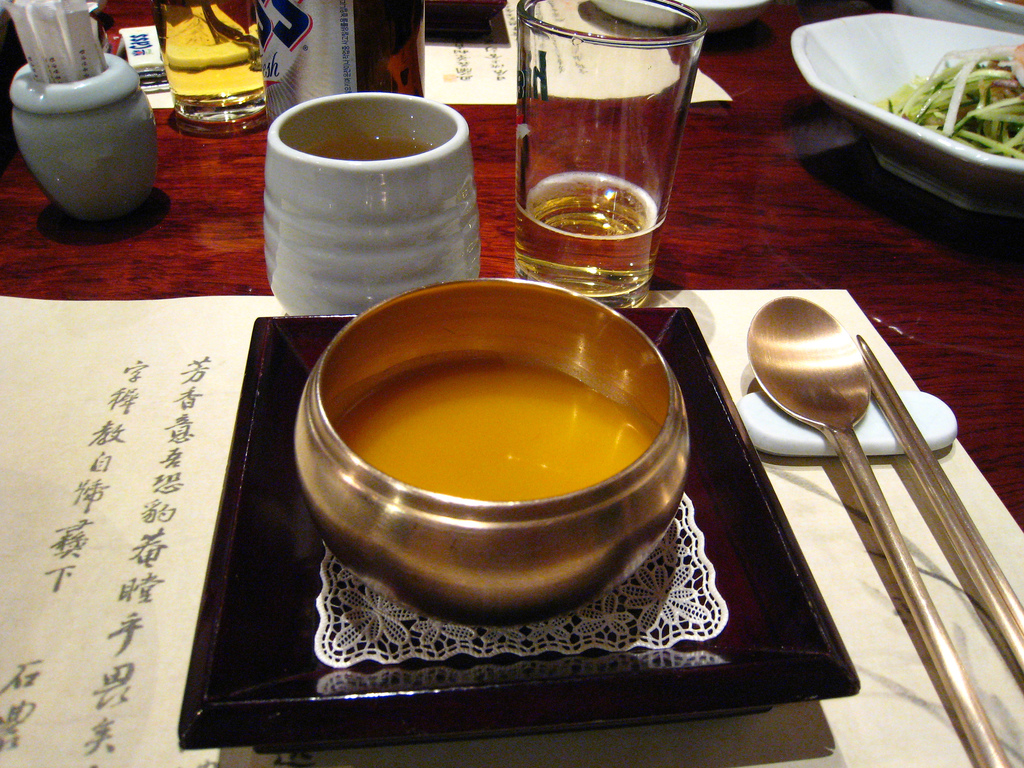
Hobak-juk served in a bangjja bowl

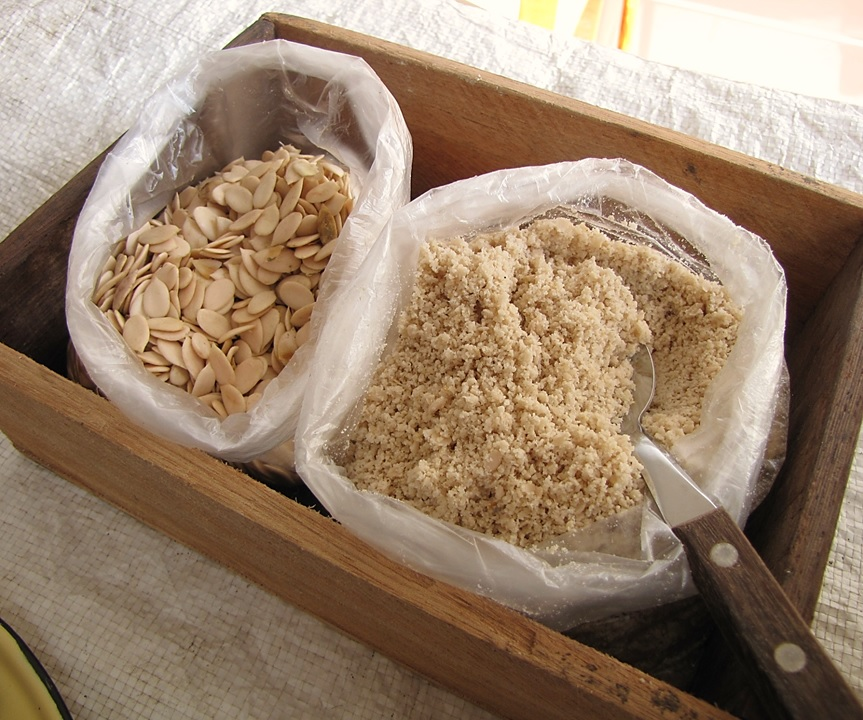
This flour was prepared using ground pumpkin seeds.

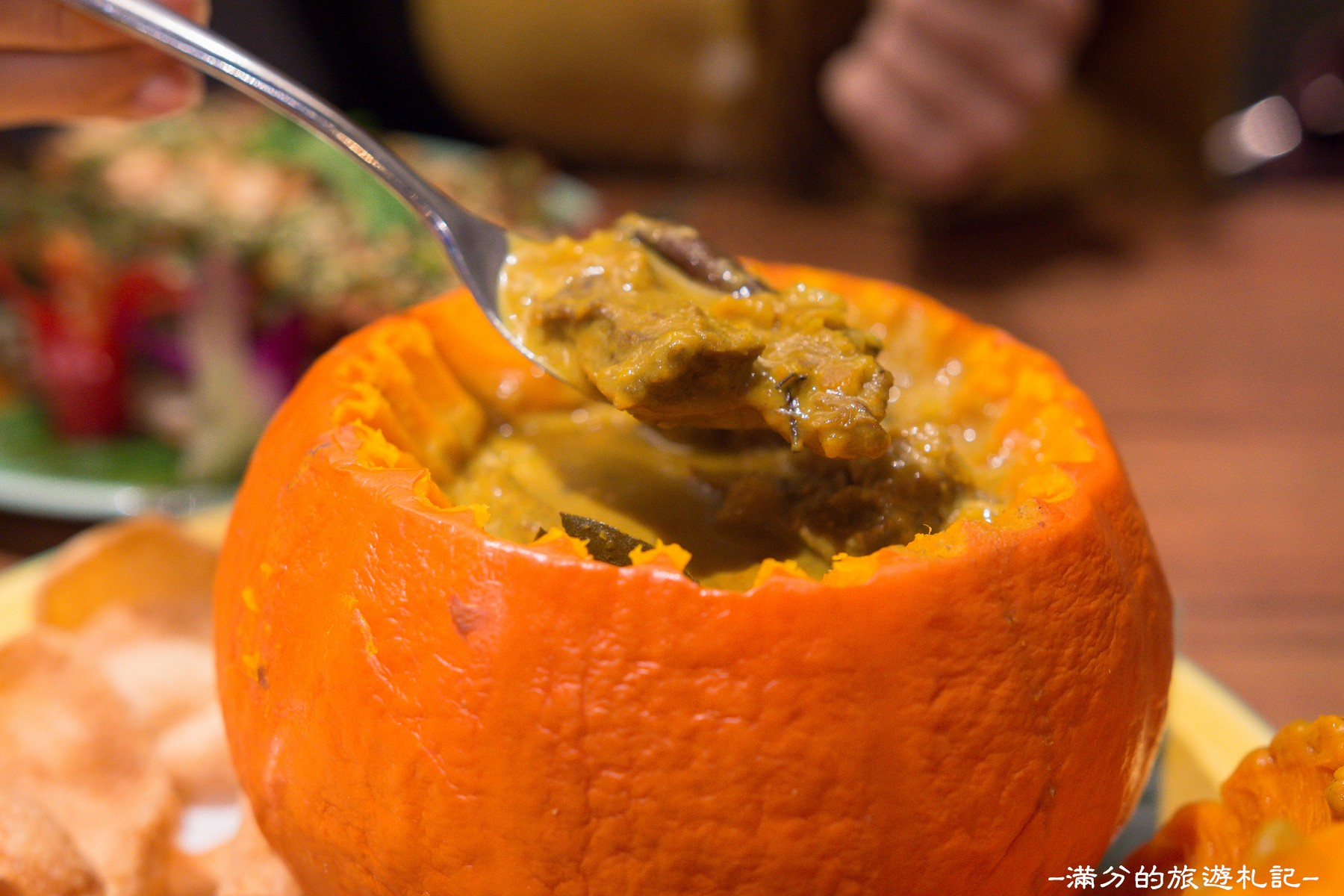
A stuffed pumpkin dish

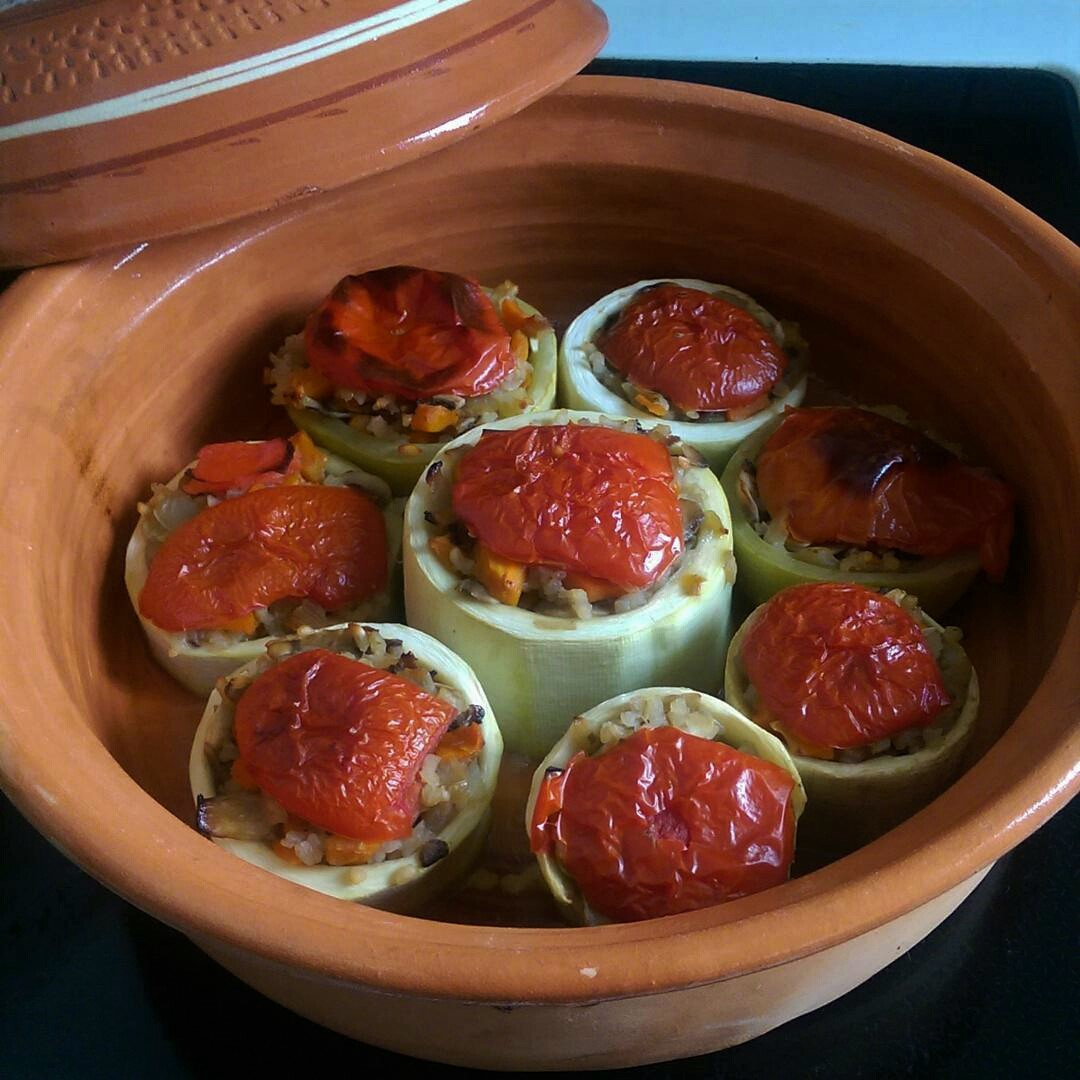
Stuffed zucchini topped with tomato

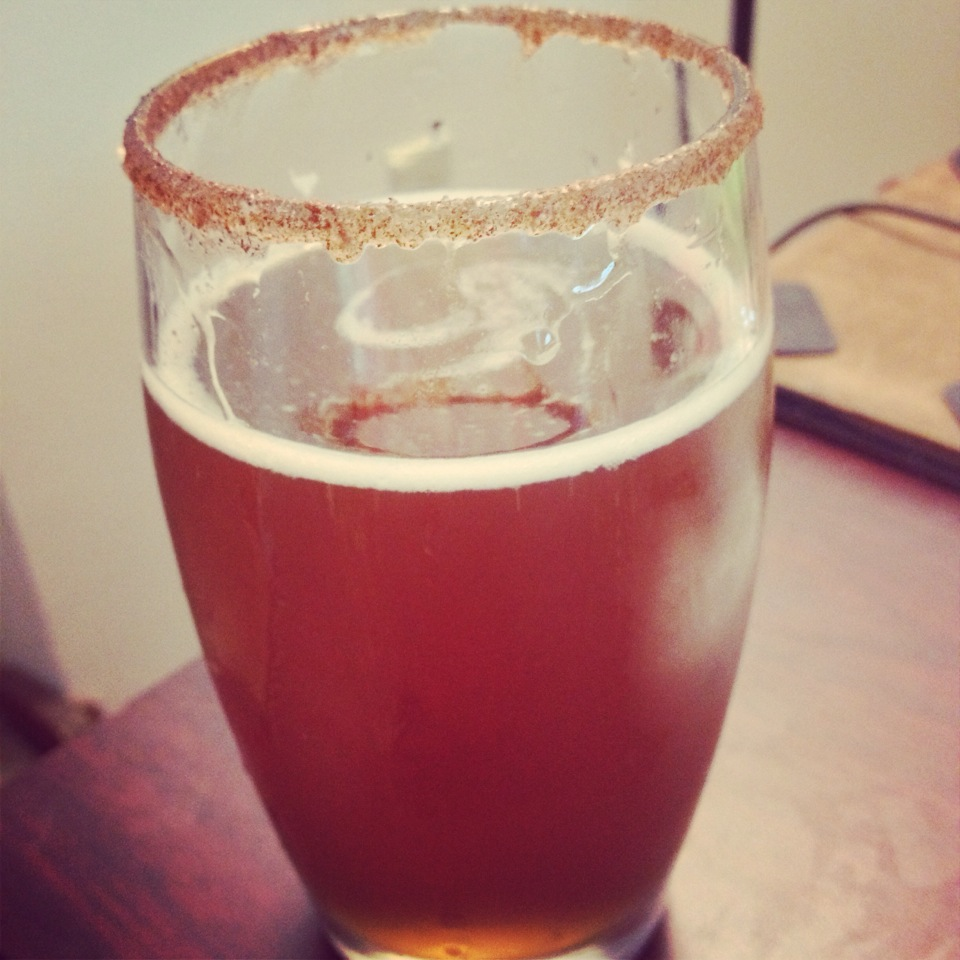
Pumpkin beer with a sugared glass rim

== See also ==
- Candy pumpkin
- List of fruit dishes
- List of gourds and squashes
- List of vegetable dishes
- Pumpkin pie spice

- Pumpkin Spice Latte
