= Pumpkin soup =

Soup made from purée of pumpkin

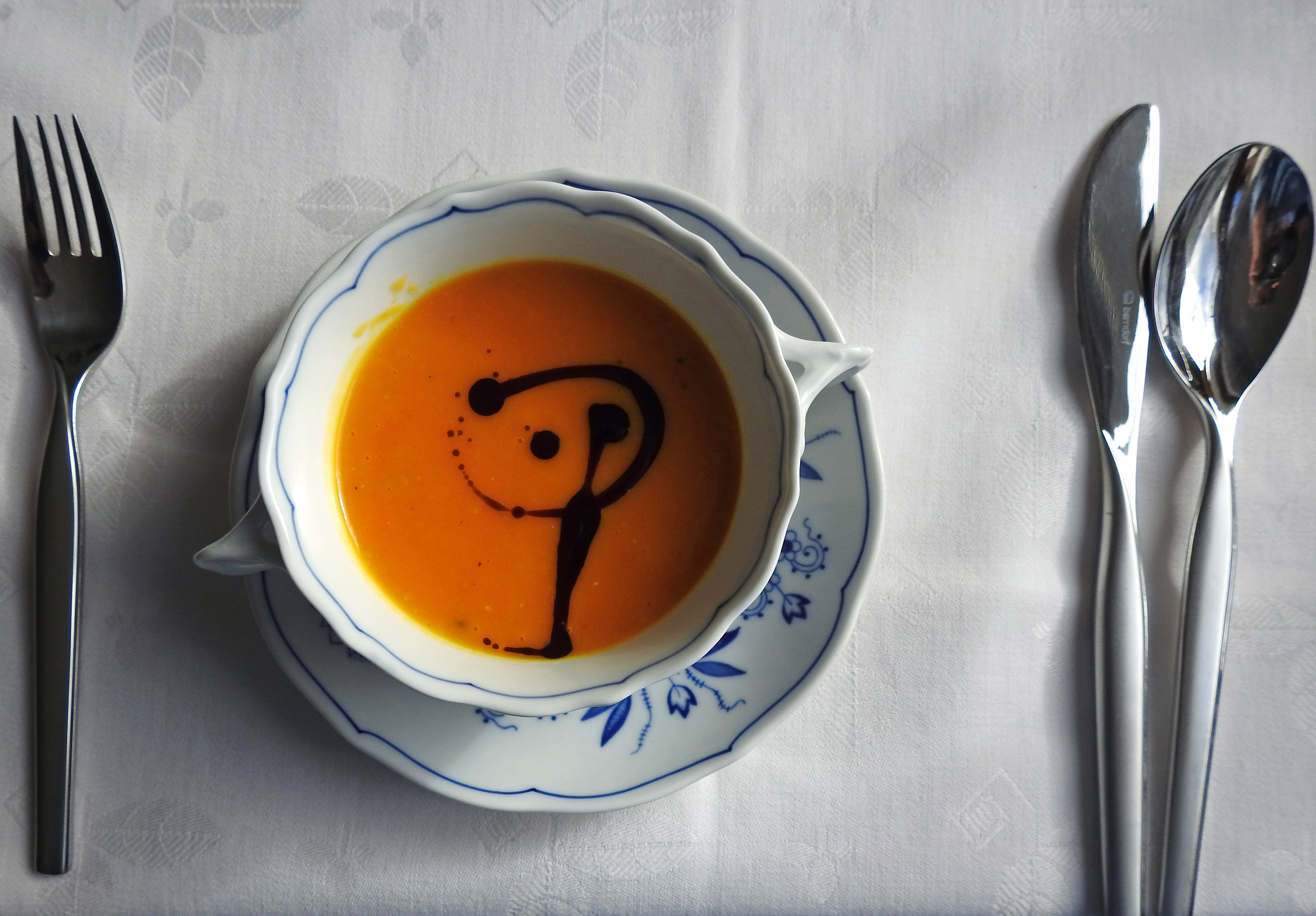
- A bowl of pumpkin cream soup
- Type: Soup
- Serving temperature: Hot or cold
- Main ingredients: Pumpkin, broth or stock

Pumpkin soup is a usually 'bound' (thick) soup made from a purée of pumpkin. It is made by combining the meat of a blended pumpkin with broth or stock. It can be served hot or cold, and is a common Thanksgiving dish in the United States. Various versions of the dish are known in many European countries, the United States and other areas of North America, in Asia and in Australia.

Squash soup is a soup prepared using squash as a primary ingredient. Squash used to prepare the soup commonly includes acorn and butternut squash.

== Preparation ==
Squash that has initially been separately roasted can be used in soup preparation. The roasting of squash can serve to concentrate the gourd's flavor. Squash soup can be prepared with chunks or pieces of squash and also with puréed squash. Pre-cooked, frozen squash can also be used, as can commercially prepared packets of pre-cooked frozen squash purée. Butternut squash soup may have a sweet flavor, due to the sugars present in the squash. Additional basic ingredients in squash soup's preparation can include broth; onion; cream; spices, such as sage and thyme; salt and pepper. Other recipes have been known to include split peas and more exotic spices, such as cumin and cinnamon. Pumpkin soup can be served hot or cold, and is a popular Thanksgiving dish in the United States.

== History ==
Pumpkin "pies" made by early American colonists had more similarities to being a savory soup served in a pumpkin than a sweet custard in a crust.

Pumpkin soup was a staple for the prisoners of war in North Vietnamese prison camps during the Vietnam War.

Squash soup is a soup in African cuisine. It is a part of the cuisine of Northern Africa, and the cuisines of Mozambique and Namibia, both of which are located in Southern Africa. Squash soup is also served in other countries and is a part of other cuisines.

A variety of pumpkin soup, called soup joumou, originated in Haiti during their independence. Designed to be a statement to French colonists that the Haitian people could work together to create something. It is traditionally consumed in the Haitian Independence Day (January 1) to commemorate the revolution in 1804.

== Gallery ==
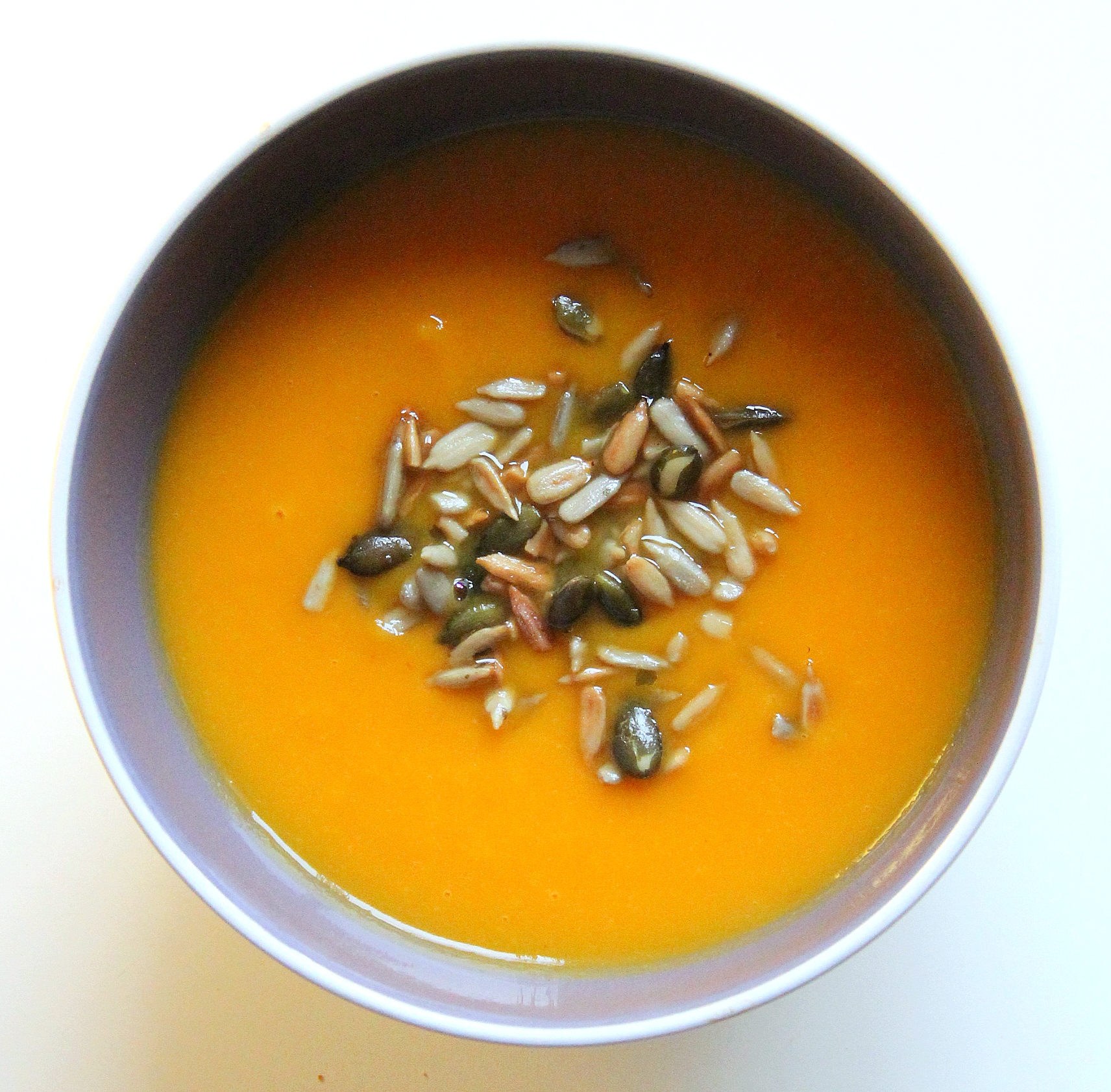
Pumpkin soup

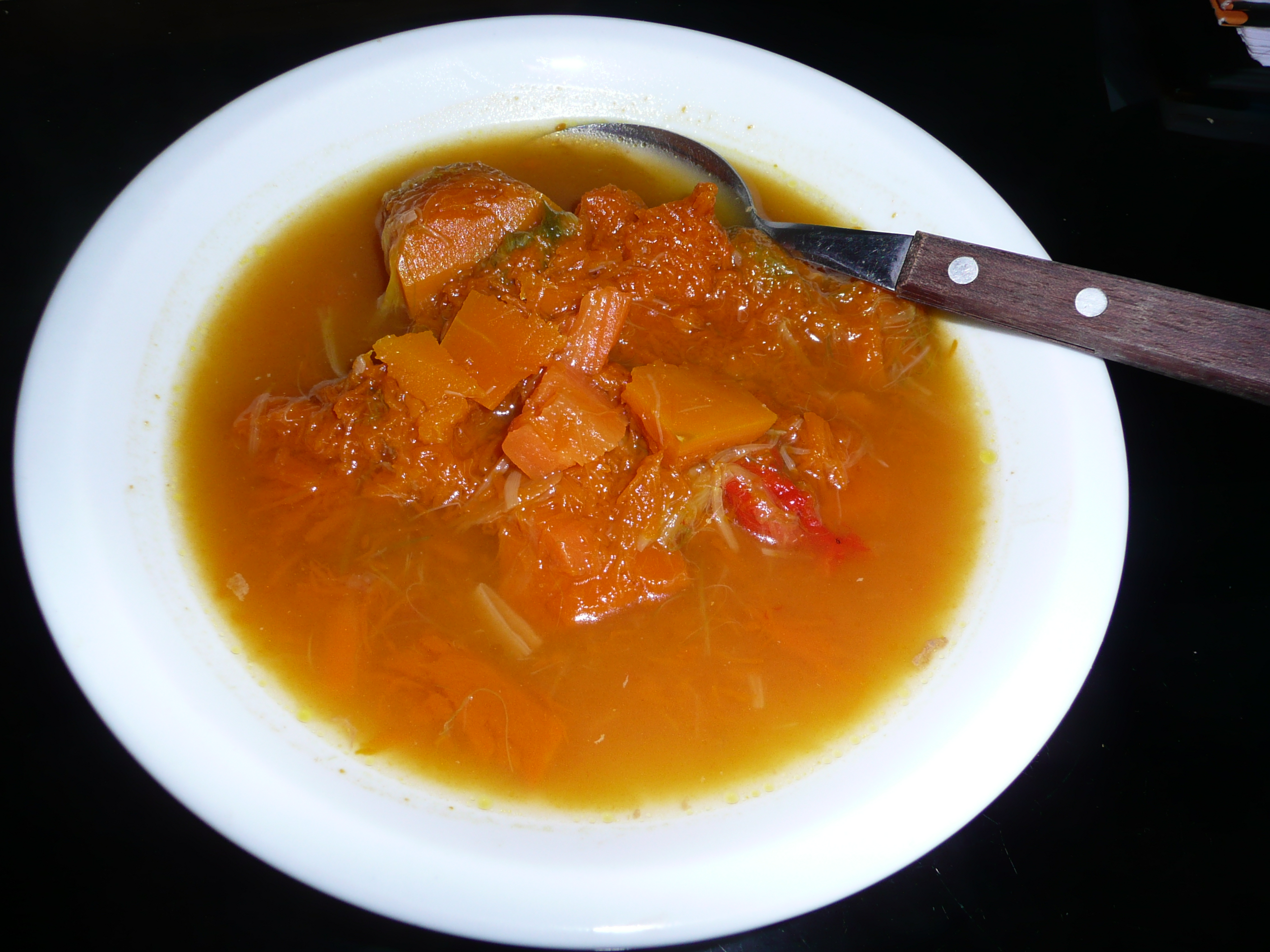
Squash soup

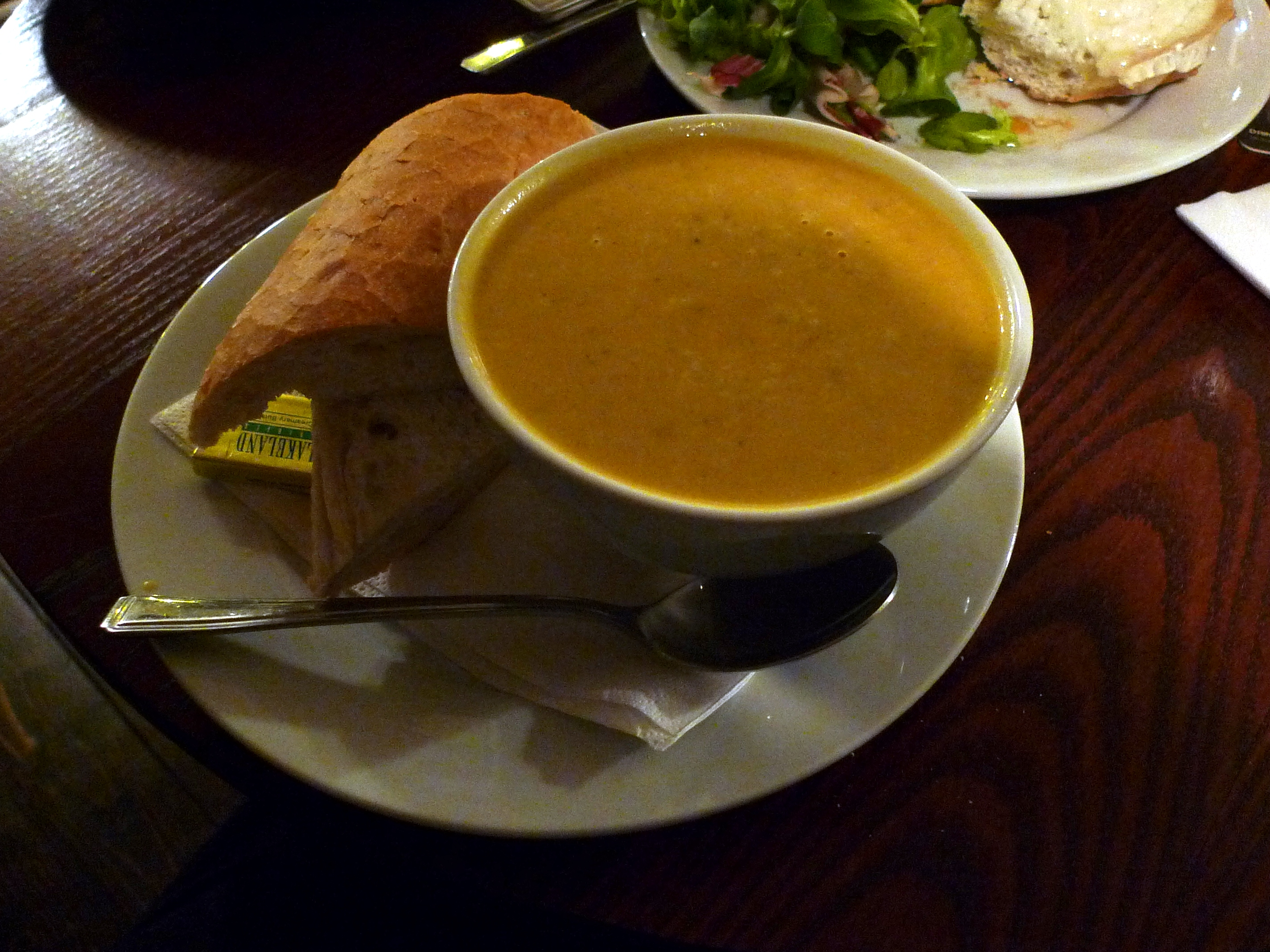
Roasted butternut squash soup

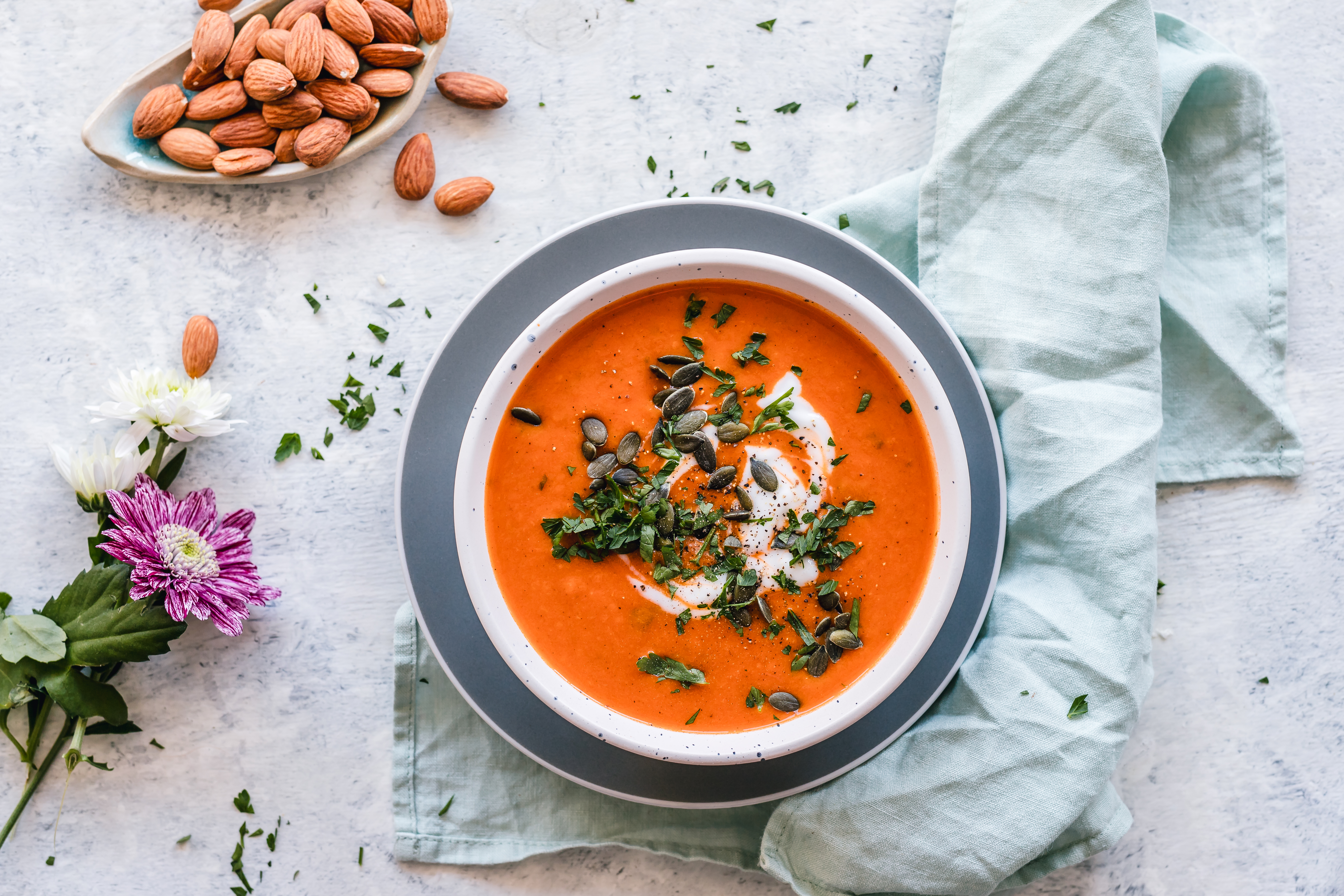
Tomato pumpkin soup

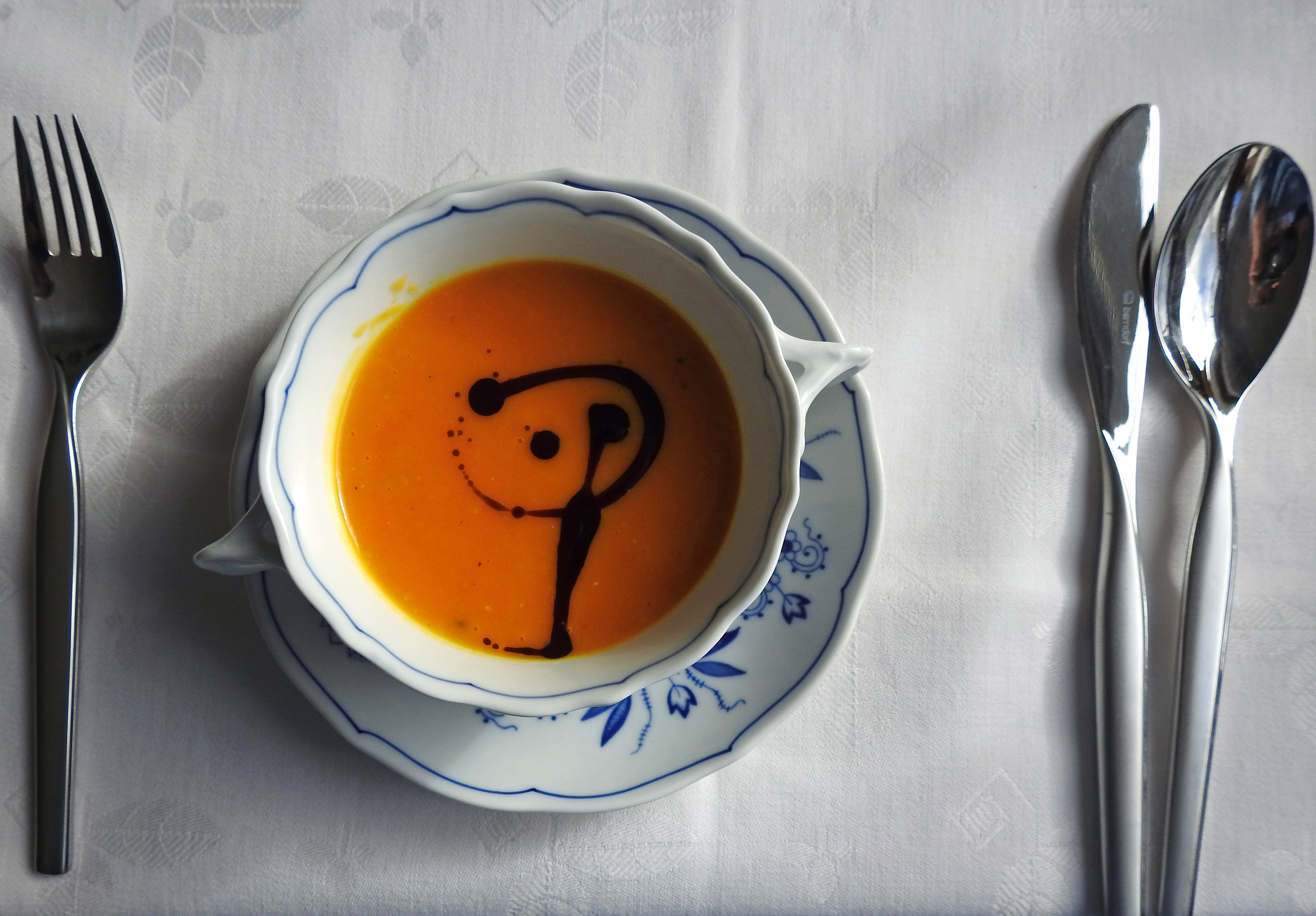
Styrian pumpkin soup always served with pumpkin seed oil

== See also ==
- List of African dishes
- List of squash and pumpkin dishes
- List of soups
- Hobak-juk
- Stuffed squash
