= Hobak-tteok =

Korean rice cake variant

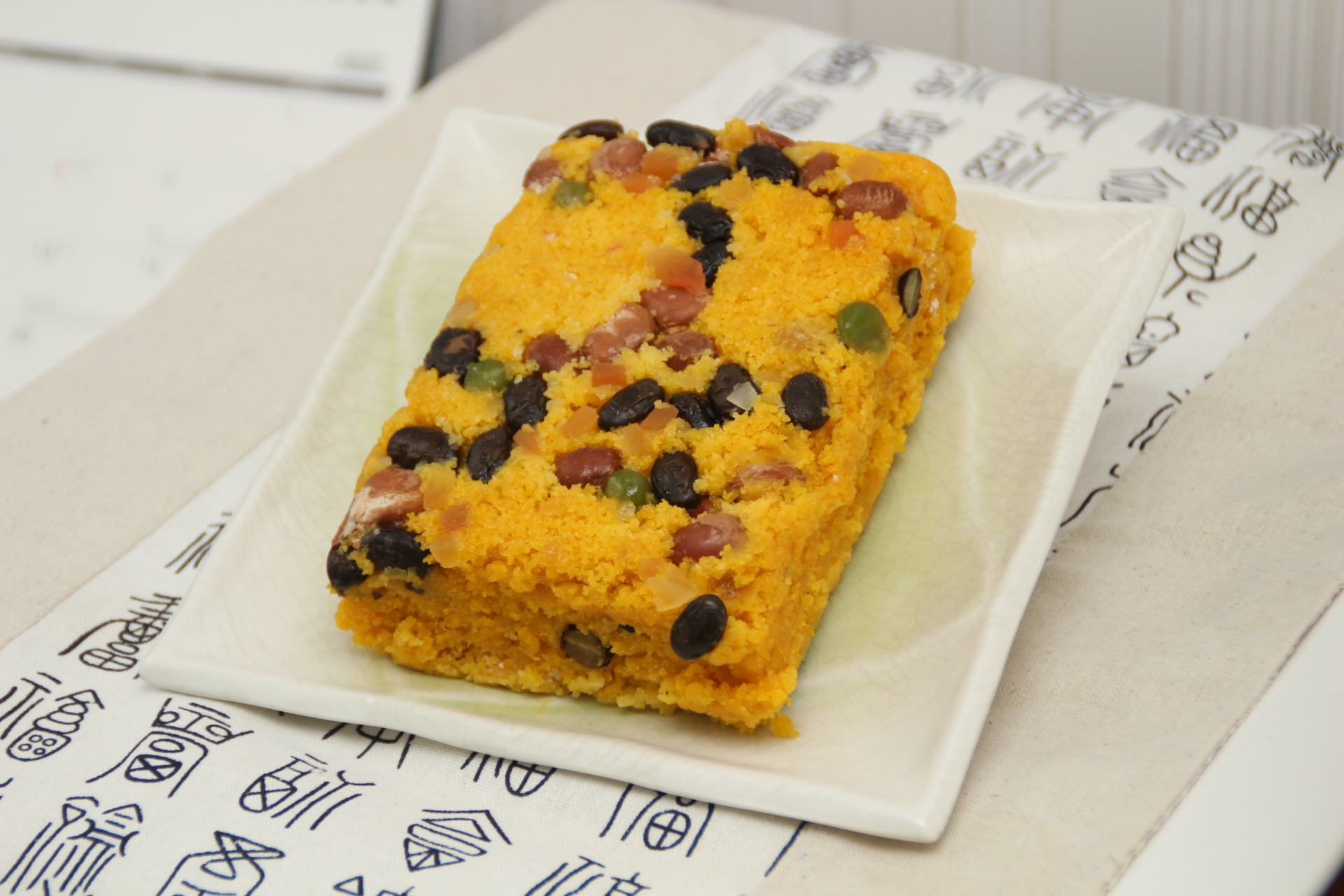
- Type: Siru-tteok
- Place of origin: Korea
- Associated cuisine: Korean cuisine
- Main ingredients: Rice flour, pumpkin
- Food energy (per 1 serving): 200 kcal (840 kJ)

Korean name
- Hangul: 호박떡
- RR: hobaktteok
- MR: hobakttŏk
- IPA: [ho.bak̚.t͈ʌk̚]

Hobak-tteok (Korean: 호박떡) is a variety of siru-tteok (steamed rice cake) made by mixing fresh or dried pumpkin with glutinous or non-glutinous rice flour, then steaming the mixture in a siru (rice cake steamer).

== Preparation ==
Washed pumpkin, preferably Korean cheese pumpkin called cheongdung-hobak (청둥호박), is minced after having its seeds removed by scraping. It is then mixed with rice flour and (optionally) sugar, and then sieved. Hobak-goji (julienned and dried pumpkin pieces) may replace the minced fresh pumpkin, in which case the flour is sieved before the addition of pumpkin pieces. Chestnuts, jujubes, red beans, and/or black beans may also be added to the sieved flour mixture. Finally, it is steamed in siru (steamer).

== See also ==
- Tteok, Korean rice cakes
- Cucurbita moschata, Korean pumpkin
- List of squash and pumpkin dishes
