= Mashed pumpkin =

Dish made of mashed or puréed pumpkin

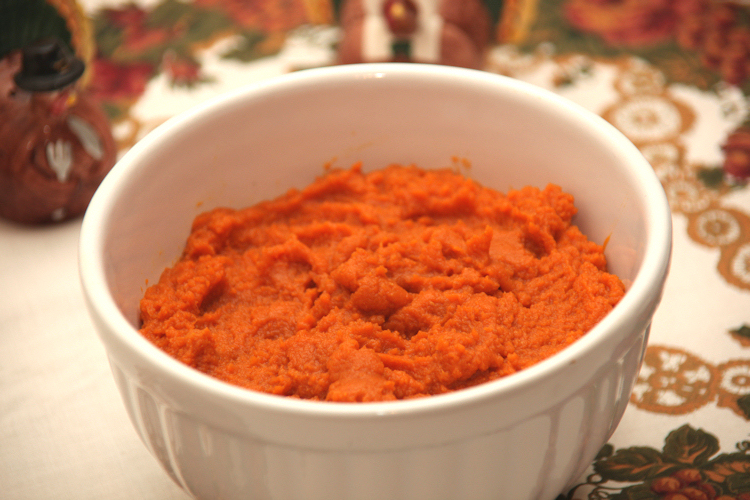
A bowl of mashed pumpkin.

Mashed pumpkin is a vegetable dish made by cooking or macerating the skinless flesh (pulp) of pumpkins and then mashing, straining, grinding, or puréeing until the desired consistency is achieved. It is traditionally served as a side dish, although it has many uses in cooking and baking.

== History ==
The pumpkin is native to North and South America. It was widely cultivated and used for food throughout much of North America by Native Americans, and many tribes on the eastern coast of North America ate mashed pumpkin. Some Native Americans also spread mashed pumpkin over scrapes and cuts as a poultice. Mashed pumpkin was likely served at the 1621 "First Thanksgiving" celebration at Plymouth Colony in America, where members of the Wampanoag tribe celebrated an iconic harvest festival with the Pilgrims. English colonists in New England quickly adopted pumpkin as a food source, and "pumpkin sauce" (mashed pumpkin) was served at inns in New England as early as 1704. Mashed pumpkin was also added to various breads and cakes as a flavoring agent as well as a sweetener. By the mid-18th century, mashed pumpkin was also being used as an ingredient in pies. In the New World Dutch colony of New Amsterdam (modern New York City), mashed pumpkin was mixed with corn meal and fried as a pancake.

== Cooking ==
Chefs generally recommend steaming when cooking pumpkin to make mashed pumpkin, as boiling in liquid tends to significantly dilute the flavor. Some chefs recommend fried or roasted pumpkin for its flavor value over mashed pumpkin. But well-seasoned mashed pumpkin goes well with cooked game birds such as quail, and mashed pumpkin sweetened with dark maple syrup is a common New England side dish served alongside roast chicken or baked ham. Mashed pumpkin may also be used as a substitute for fat in many bread and cake recipes.

== Nutritional information ==
A single cup of unseasoned mashed pumpkin contains only 49 calories, but has 564 mg of potassium, 5,000 mcg of beta-carotene, 853 mcg of alpha-carotene, 3,500 mcg of beta-cryptoxanthin, 2,400 mcg of lutein and zeaxanthin, 12,000 IUs of vitamin A, and 2.5 g of dietary fiber.

== See also ==
- List of squash and pumpkin dishes
