= Pumpkin rice vermicelli =

Taiwanese noodle dish

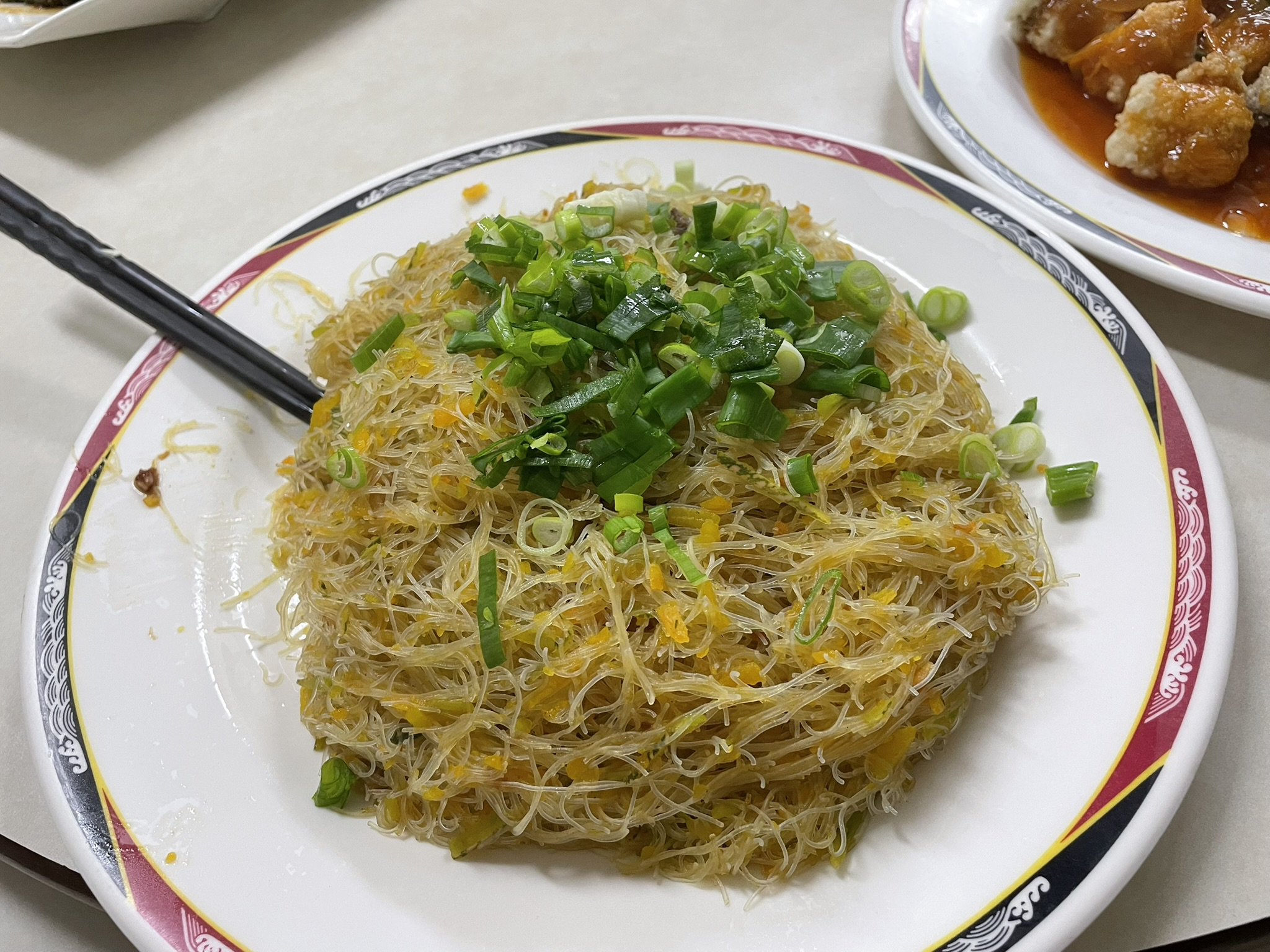
- Alternative names: Pumpkin rice noodles
- Place of origin: Taiwan
- Region or state: Penghu
- Main ingredients: pumpkin, rice vermicelli

Pumpkin rice vermicelli (Chinese: 金瓜米粉) is a Taiwanese stir-fried noodle dish made with thin rice vermicelli and shredded pumpkin. It is a specialty of Penghu. The dish is first prepared by heating oil in a wok with garlic and shallots until fragrant, after which shredded pumpkin is added and stir-fried until softened. Then, rice vermicelli that was first soaked in water to soften is added and mixed until evenly coated with the pumpkin. Sometimes, other ingredients like pork belly and mushroom shreds are also included to improve the overall flavour of the dish.

The dish is traditionally cooked in large batches during festivals, family gatherings and banquets as well as in rechao restaurants. The dish is relatively low cost and vegetarian-friendly, which was what made it popular across Taiwan.

== See also ==
- Taiwanese cuisine
- List of squash and pumpkin dishes
- Oyster vermicelli
