= Kadu bouranee =

Afghan pumpkin dish

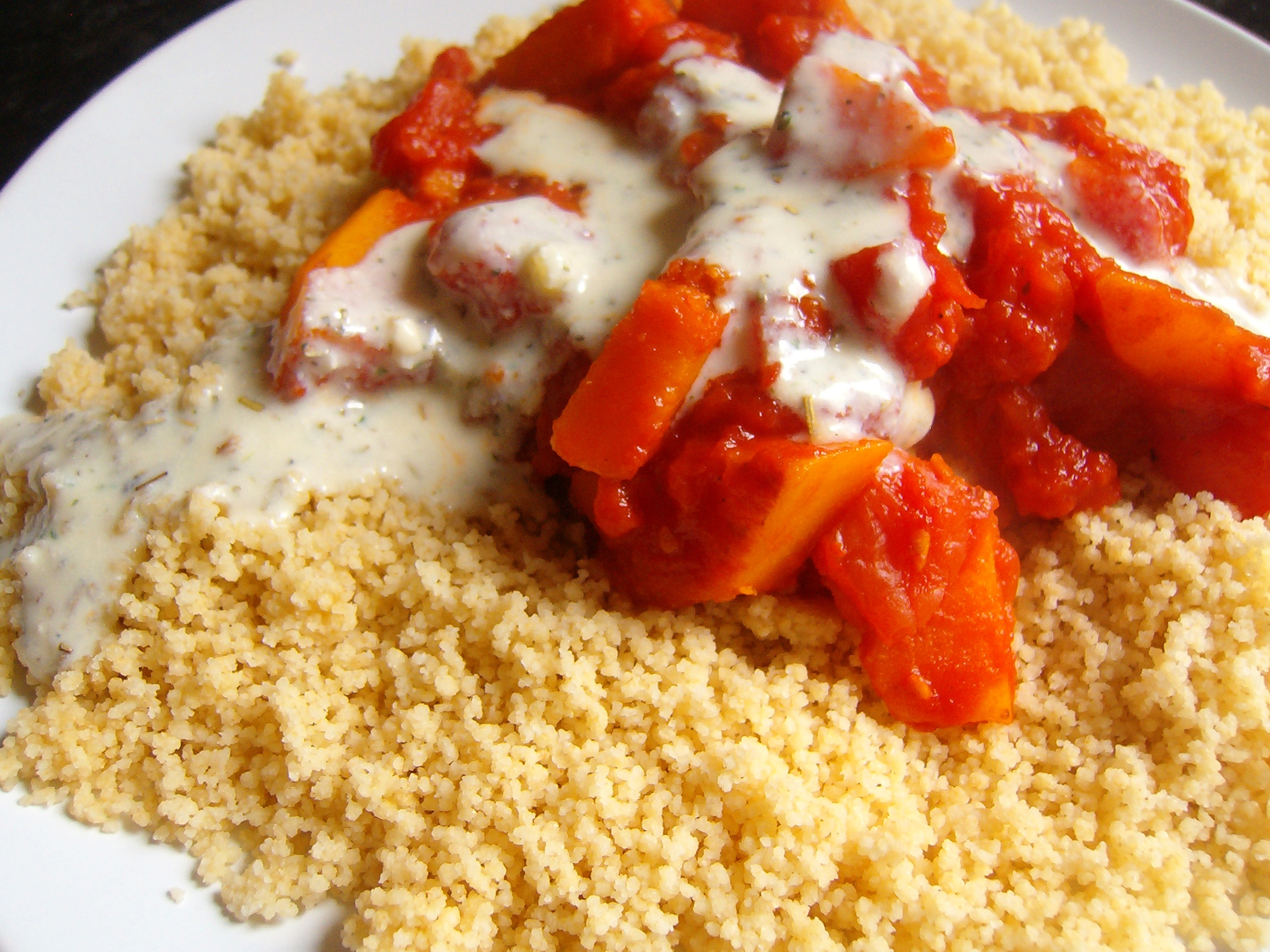
Vegan Kadu Bouranee where tofu-based mint sauce is used instead of yogurt sauce. Also couscous is used instead of rice.

Kadu bouranee is an Afghan pumpkin dish made by frying pumpkin with different spices. It is topped with chaka/sour cream and dried mint. Kadu bouranee is eaten with bread or rice.

== See also ==
- List of squash and pumpkin dishes
