= Kabak tatlısı =

Pumpkin dessert in Turkish cuisine

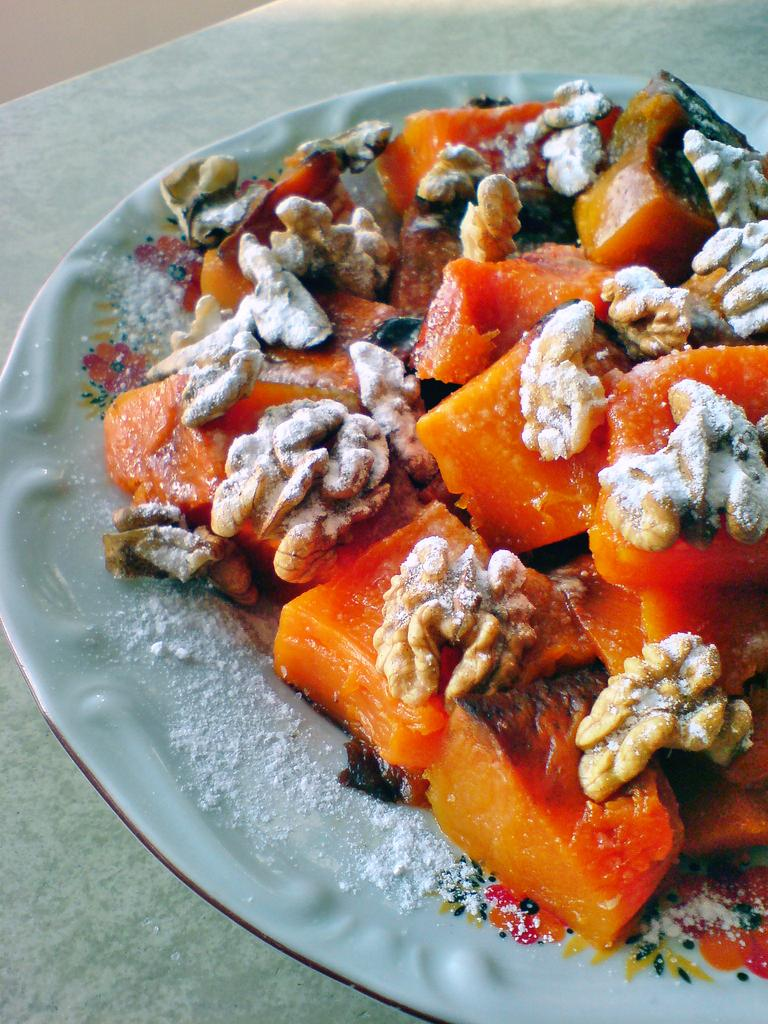
- Course: Dessert
- Place of origin: Turkey
- Main ingredients: Pumpkin

Kabak tatlısı (Turkish for "pumpkin dessert"), is a pumpkin dessert in Turkish cuisine.It is made by cooking peeled and cut pumpkin in a syrup made out of water, cinnamon, cardamom, vanilla and bay leaves, essentially candying it. Milk can also be used. The dish is topped with chopped walnuts, tahini or kaymak. It is a winter-time seasonal dessert. The texture has been described as resembling taffy.

== See also ==
- List of desserts
- List of squash and pumpkin dishes
