= Spaghetti alla Nerano =

Italian pasta dish

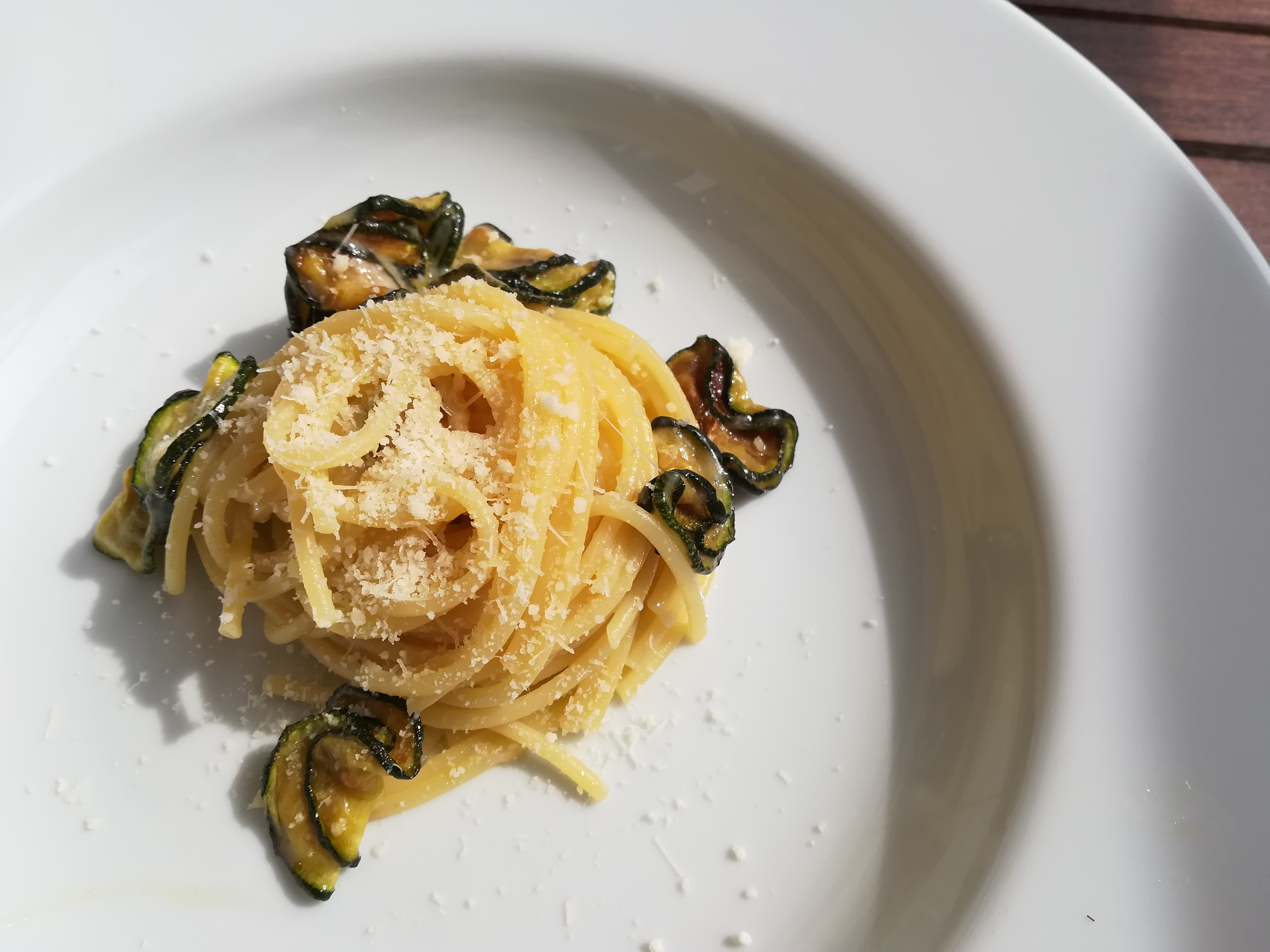
- Course: Primo (Italian course)
- Place of origin: Italy
- Region or state: Nerano, Campania
- Main ingredients: Spaghetti, fried zucchini, provolone del Monaco, Parmesan, extra virgin olive oil, black pepper, garlic, basil

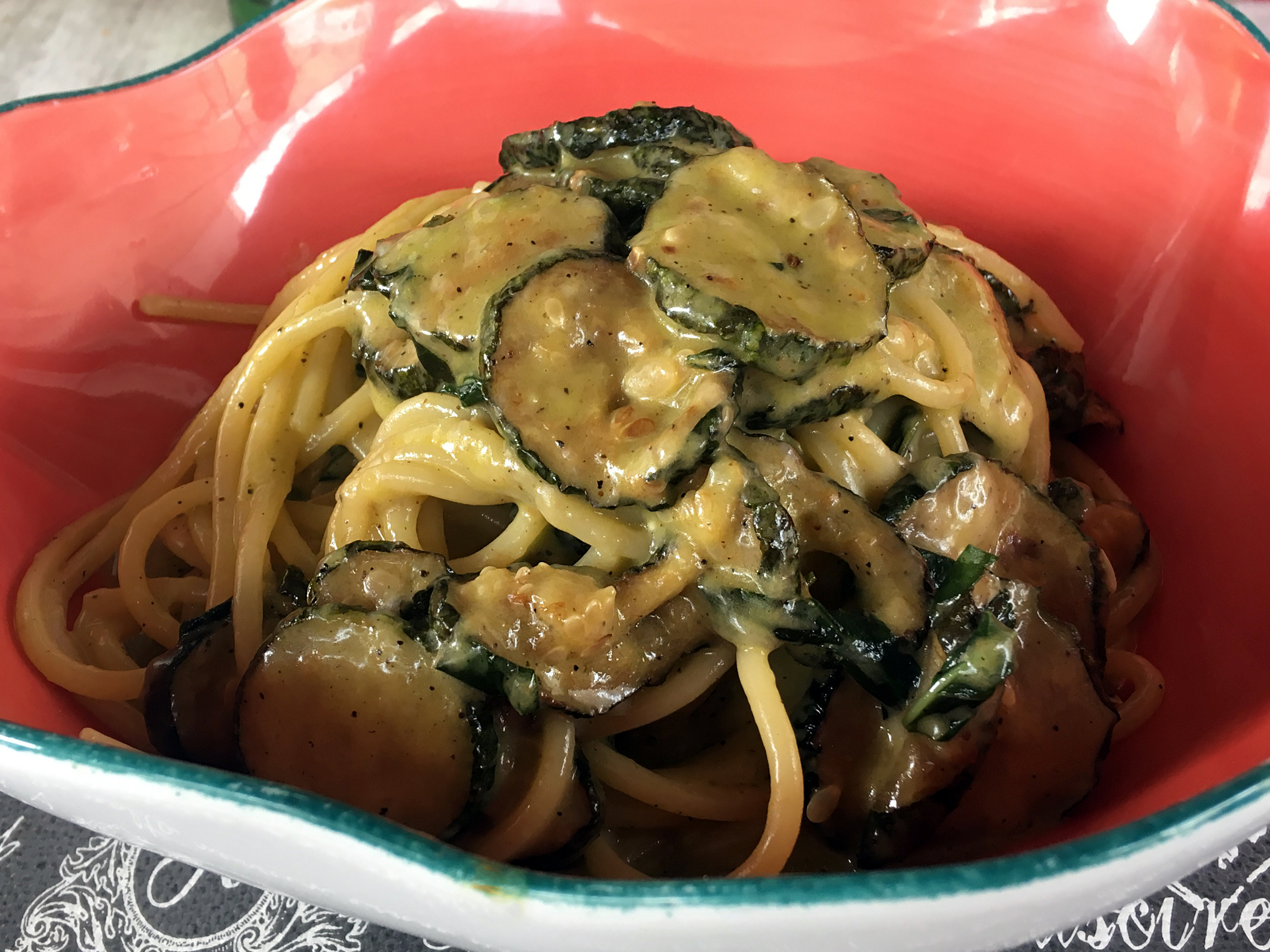
Spaghetti alla Nerano

Spaghetti alla Nerano is a pasta dish invented in the village of Nerano, on the Sorrento Peninsula, made with spaghetti, fried zucchini, provolone del Monaco, Parmesan, extra virgin olive oil, black pepper, garlic, basil, and salt. It is similar to pasta alla Norma.

Among the many attributions circulating, the main one points to a restaurant owner named Maria Grazia in the mid-1950s. The dish has gained popularity beyond the village of Nerano.

== See also ==
- List of pasta
- List of pasta dishes
- List of squash and pumpkin dishes
