= Ghapama =

Armenian stuffed pumpkin dish

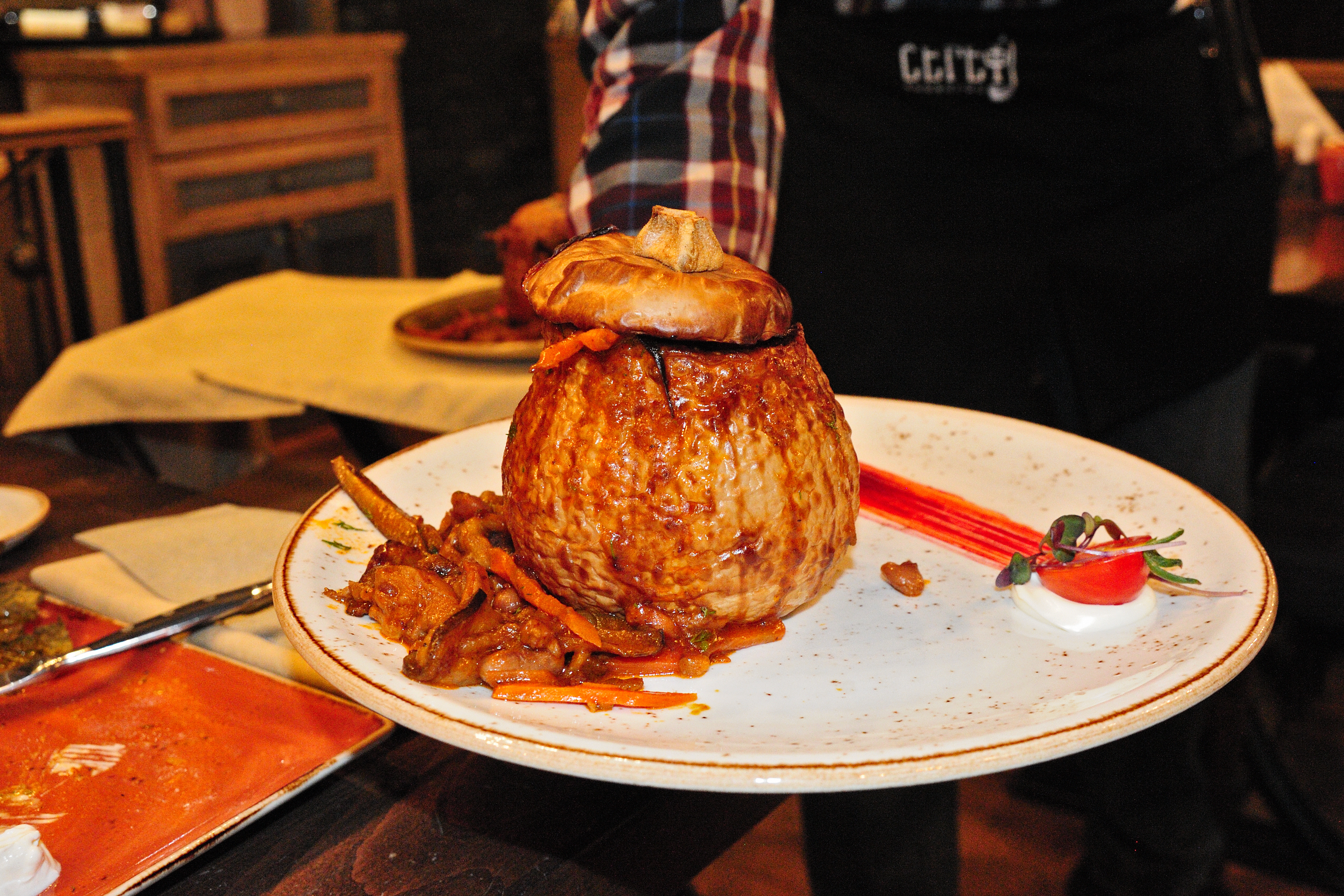
- Ghapama served in a restaurant
- Type: Dessert
- Place of origin: Armenia
- Main ingredients: Pumpkin, rice, dried fruits, meat

Ghapama (Armenian: ղափամա) is an Armenian stuffed pumpkin dish, usually served as a dessert. It is prepared by removing the inside of the pumpkin (known as դդում in Armenian, pronounced dt'um in Eastern Armenian and t't'um in Western Armenian) and stuffing it with cooked rice, butter, honey, dried fruits, nuts, and meat, to be baked. Dried fruits used in the dish include figs, apricots, prunes, and raisins, while the nuts include walnuts and almonds.

Historically, crops such as pumpkins, potatoes, peppers, and tomatoes, were brought to Armenia in the 19th century from the "New World". The crops were mixed with traditional Armenian dishes and were then "naturalized" to Armenian cuisine according to writers Irina Petrosian and David Underwood. Other than ghapama, other Armenian dishes that used the crops in include ajapsandali and tomato lavash.

== Etymology ==
The word itself is from Ottoman Turkish قپامه (kapama, “lamb stewed in a covered pot”), but the dish itself is likely of native origin.

Ghapama is usually served during autumn time in Armenia to celebrate the harvest during the season. The dish is also served at other major celebrations, such as Christmas, New Year, Easter, and weddings.

A song in The Armenian Folk Song Treasury highlights the dish, being the only song in the treasury to highlight a food item. The song is entitled "Hey Jan Ghapama" (Armenian: Հէյ Ջան Ղափամա) and repeats a line admiring the taste and aroma of ghapama. Lyrically, the song is about a community that was attracted by the dish's aroma made by one of the families in the community, everyone in the community ate a piece of the dish until it was finished. The song is commonly played at weddings was popularized by pop singer Harout Pamboukjian and by a Russian spin-off of My Big Fat Greek Wedding named My Big Armenian Wedding (Russian: Моя большая армянская свадьба).

== See also ==
- List of desserts
- List of squash and pumpkin dishes
- List of stuffed dishes
