= Fakthong kaeng buat =

Traditional Thai sweet

Pumpkin in coconut cream, known in Thai as fakthong kaeng buat (Thai: ฟักทองแกงบวด, romanized: fakthǭngkǣngbūat, pronounced [fák tʰɔ̄ːŋ kɛ̄ːŋ bùa̯t]), is a traditional Thai desert. It is regarded to be one of the most well known Thai desserts.

The history of fakthong kaeng buat is unknown. According to some research, the dish may have been introduced by local people in the Northeast of Thailand. (Napasorn Phrayalaw, 2012)

== See also ==
- List of Thai desserts
- List of squash and pumpkin dishes
