= Poultice =

Soft moist mass applied to the skin as wound or pain treatment

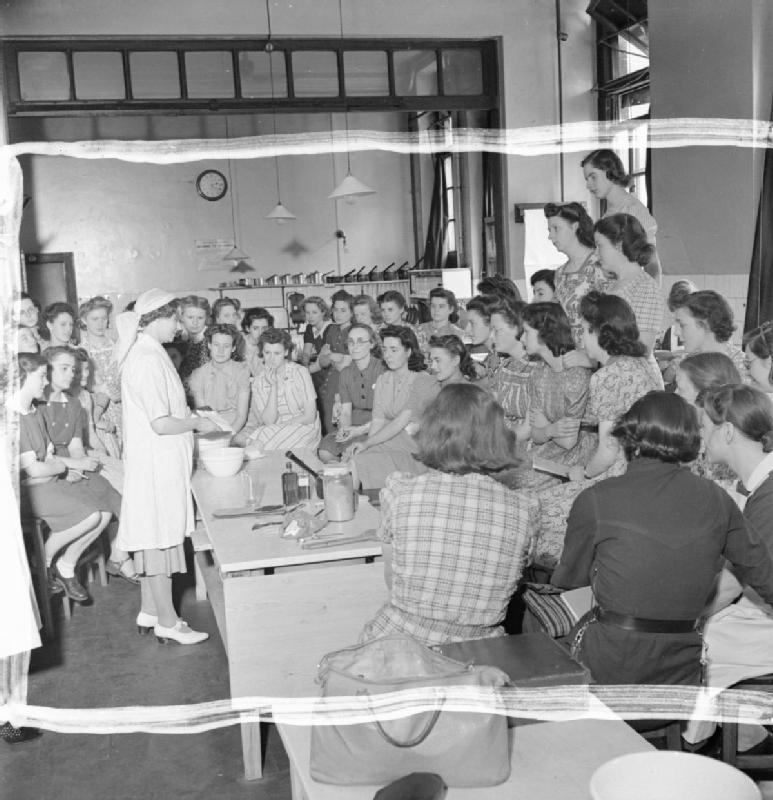
Schoolgirls in Britain being shown how to make a poultice, 1942

A poultice or cataplasm, also called a fomentation, is a soft moist mass, often heated and medicated, that is applied to the skin to reduce inflammation, soothe pain, promote healing, or otherwise treat wounds or ailments. Soft materials like cereals serve as a base for agents intended to affect the body transdermally. The preparation is usually spread on cloth, which is then applied to the area being treated. The cloth is used to keep the preparation in place, or additional bandaging to hold the poultice may be employed. Direct topical application (without cloths) is also used.

The term "poultice" may also refer to a porous solid, filled with a solvent, and used to remove stains from porous stone such as marble or granite.

== History ==
Etymology

The term poultice comes from the Latin puls or pultēs, meaning "porridge" or "thick pap," through Middle English pultes. This reflects the traditional preparation of poultices as soft, moist masses resembling porridge.

Ancient use

Poultices have been documented in many ancient medical traditions, including Egypt, Mesopotamia, India, Greece, and Rome. They were usually made from plants, animal products, or minerals, and applied directly to the skin to reduce pain, inflammation, or infection.

- Egypt (c. 1600–1500 BCE): The Edwin Smith Papyrus (c. 1600 BCE), one of the earliest known surgical texts, describes wound treatments involving cleansing, bandaging, and poultice-like applications made with honey and animal fats. The Ebers Papyrus (c. 1550 BCE) contains numerous recipes for poultices combining lint, honey, and grease, applied to wounds and inflammations.
- Mesopotamia (c. 2200 BCE): Sumerian clay tablets describe wound washing, herbal dressings, and poultices using ingredients such as milk and beer.
- India (c. 200 CE): The Sushruta Samhita, a foundational Sanskrit medical encyclopedia, prescribed poultices made of herbs, ghee, and oils for in many contexts including for cleansing wounds and promoting healing.
- Greece and Rome (c. 400 BCE - 200 CE): Hippocrates (c. 460–370 BCE) recommended cleansing wounds with wine or vinegar, then applying poultices of honey, oil, and wine. In both Greece and Rome, poultices of wool, linen, and crushed plants were commonly used for inflammations and injuries.

Later practices

During the Middle Ages and Renaissance, poultices made from flour, linseed, mustard, bran, herbs, or bread were widely used in Europe. They were often applied hot to "draw out" infection, relieve swelling, or soften abscesses. Poultices subsequently remained a standard remedy in both civilian and military medicine.

- In the Crimean war (1853–1856), mustard poultices were used for chest and abdominal complaints, including dysentery and cholera.
- During the American Civil War (1861–1865), poultices were applied to wounds when antiseptics such as iodine were unavailable.
- Honey-based poultices were used to aid wound healing during the world wars, taking advantage of honey's antimicrobial properties.

Decline and survival in traditional medicine

- By the mid-20th century, the advent of antibiotics and sterile dressings led to the decline of poultices in mainstream Western medicine. However, poultices have continued to be used in folk and traditional medicine worldwide for burns, insect bites, and chronic wounds.
- Native American medicine includes thousands of plants for the making of poultices.

== Preparation and composition ==
- Some Native Americans used mashed pumpkin or devil's club as a poultice.
- In addition to bread and cereals, bran may also be used as a poultice because of its absorbent quality. It is packed into the wound and then covered with a piece of sacking or similar material before being bandaged onto the site of the wound.
- There are also many commercial poultices that are ready-made. Some of these may be labeled as "drawing salves".
- Ash poultices can cause a chemical burn.

== Types ==
Fomentations – heated poultices – may be used to promote blood circulation to an affected area; these may be unmedicated.

Cold poultices are sometimes used. An example is the use of cabbage leaves to reduce breast engorgement in breastfeeding mothers. The leaves are applied directly to the breast, often simply held in place by a bra. Evidence for effectiveness as a treatment is weak: cabbage poultices are about as effective as the frequent, unrestricted feeding of the infant; they have no effect on the rate of progression to mastitis. There is some slight evidence that cabbage poultices reduce the pain of engorgement.

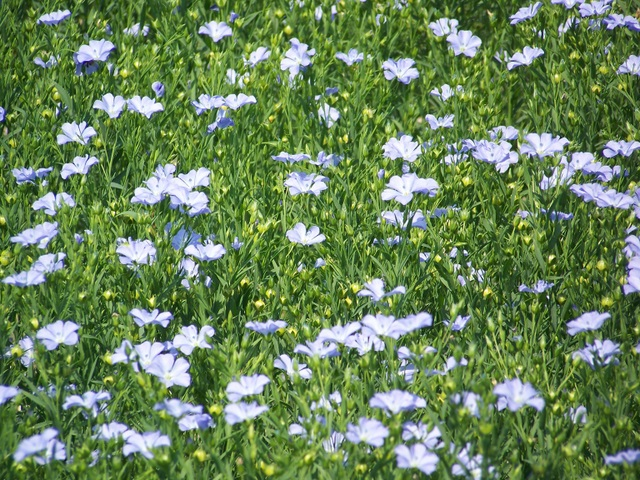
Linseed flax (Linum usitatissimum) may be used in a poultice for boils, inflammation and wounds.

== Veterinary use ==
Poultices are used on horses to relieve inflammation. Usually applied to the lower legs, under a stable bandage, to focus treatment on the easily injured tendons in the area. Poultices are sometimes applied as a precautionary measure after the horse has worked hard, such as after racing, jumping, or cross-country riding, to forestall strains or stiffness. They may be used to treat abscesses, with the intention of drawing out pus from the wound.

Cooling poultices are sometimes used for show-jumpers and racehorses; these may be cheaper and easier to administer than commercial cooling products. A poultice is applied to the horse's distal limbs after exercise, for 9–12 hours. The intended effect is to cool the legs over a long period of time, by dispersing heat from the limb through the action of evaporation. Commonly, the poultice is bandaged over, sometimes with materials such wet newspaper between the poultice and bandages; this greatly reduces evaporation and heat loss, rendering the poultice ineffective at cooling.
