= Soup joumou =

Haitian soup

Soup Joumou
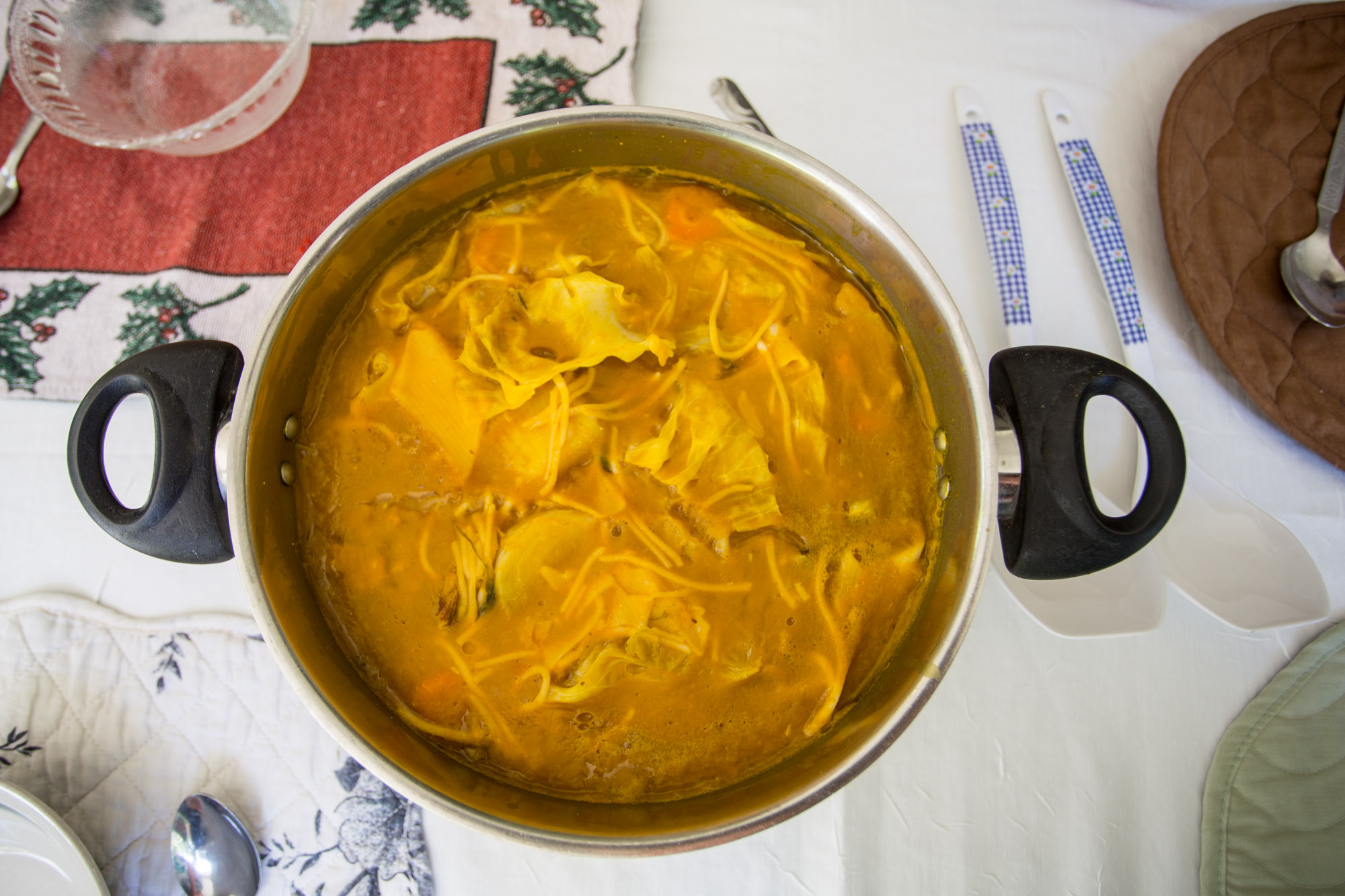
- Alternative names: Soupe au giraumon
- Type: Soup
- Place of origin: Haiti
- Main ingredients: Squash, beef, potatoes, vegetables

Joumou soup
- UNESCO Intangible Cultural Heritage
- Country: Haiti
- Reference: 01853
- Region: Latin America and the Caribbean

Inscription history
- Inscription: 2021 (16th session)
- List: Representative

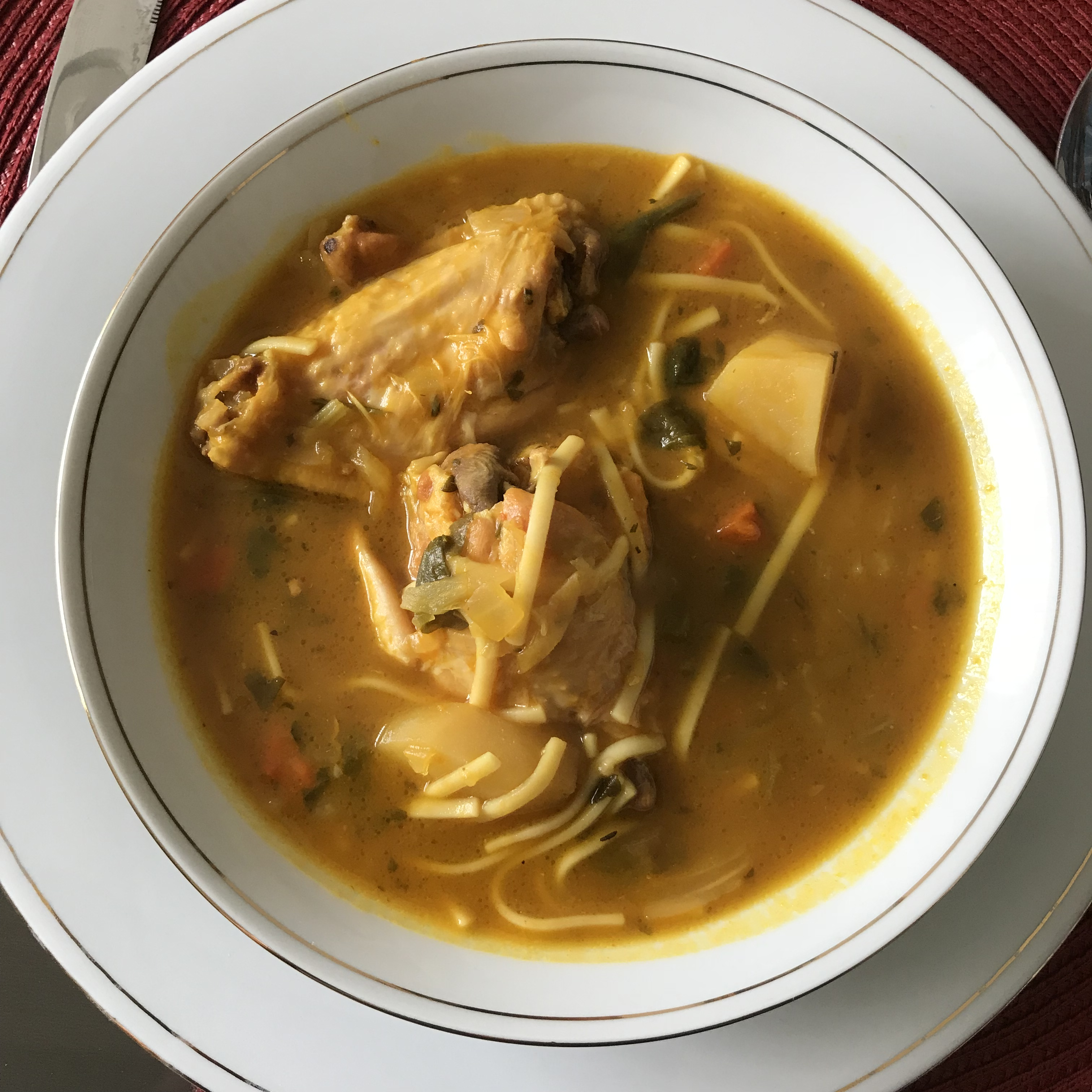
Soup joumou

Soup Joumou (/dʒuːmuː/; French: soupe au giraumon, lit. ‘pumpkin soup’) is a soup native to Haitian cuisine. In 2021, soup joumou was added to the UNESCO Intangible Cultural Heritage List.

== Background and historical significance ==
The dish gets its name ‘pumpkin soup’ from the main ingredient squash. When Haiti was colonized by France in the 1600s and 1700s, enslaved Africans were forced to cultivate the squash that forms the base of the beef soup known as joumou, which means squash or pumpkin in Creole. Due to trade practices, pumpkin was shipped abroad or consumed by the property owning landed class, the African and Indigenous Haitian population toiling on plantations were forbidden from eating it themselves. When the Haitian Revolution ended with Haiti's liberation from French colonial rule on Jan. 1, 1804, Haitians celebrated by consuming soup joumou all day, relishing the taste of freedom. Haitians both at home and in the diaspora eat this soup to celebrate the first successful slave rebellion that transferred political power to its freed slave majority. Once the soup is ready, it’s typically eaten as breakfast, lunch, and dinner on New Year’s Day and consumed into the next day as part of Ancestry Day a holiday honoring Haitian revolutionaries on January 2.

== Preparation ==
The soup is traditionally cooked with winter squashes such as the turban squash. The meat is marinated and simmered in a saucepan until tender while the squash is cooked, and pureed, often using a blender or food processor, to create a smooth, thick consistency. This pureed squash is then added to the simmering broth and meat mixture along with pieces of beef and soup bones, potato, and vegetables such as malanga, leeks, celery, radishes, carrots, green cabbage, habanero pepper and onions. Epis, salt, and seasoning along with lime juice, garlic, parsley and other herbs and spices are then added. Some Haitians add thin pasta such as vermicelli and macaroni and a small amount of butter or oil. The soup is always served hot and is usually accompanied by sliced French bread which is dipped in the soup.

== UNESCO recognition ==
In December 2021, Haiti obtained official recognition for the knowledge, know-how and practices pertaining to the consumption of soup joumou on the Representative List of the Intangible Cultural Heritage of Humanity by UNESCO. It was Haiti’s first inclusion on the list.

== See also ==
- List of soups
- List of squash and pumpkin dishes
