= Siru-tteok =

Type of steamed Korean rice cake

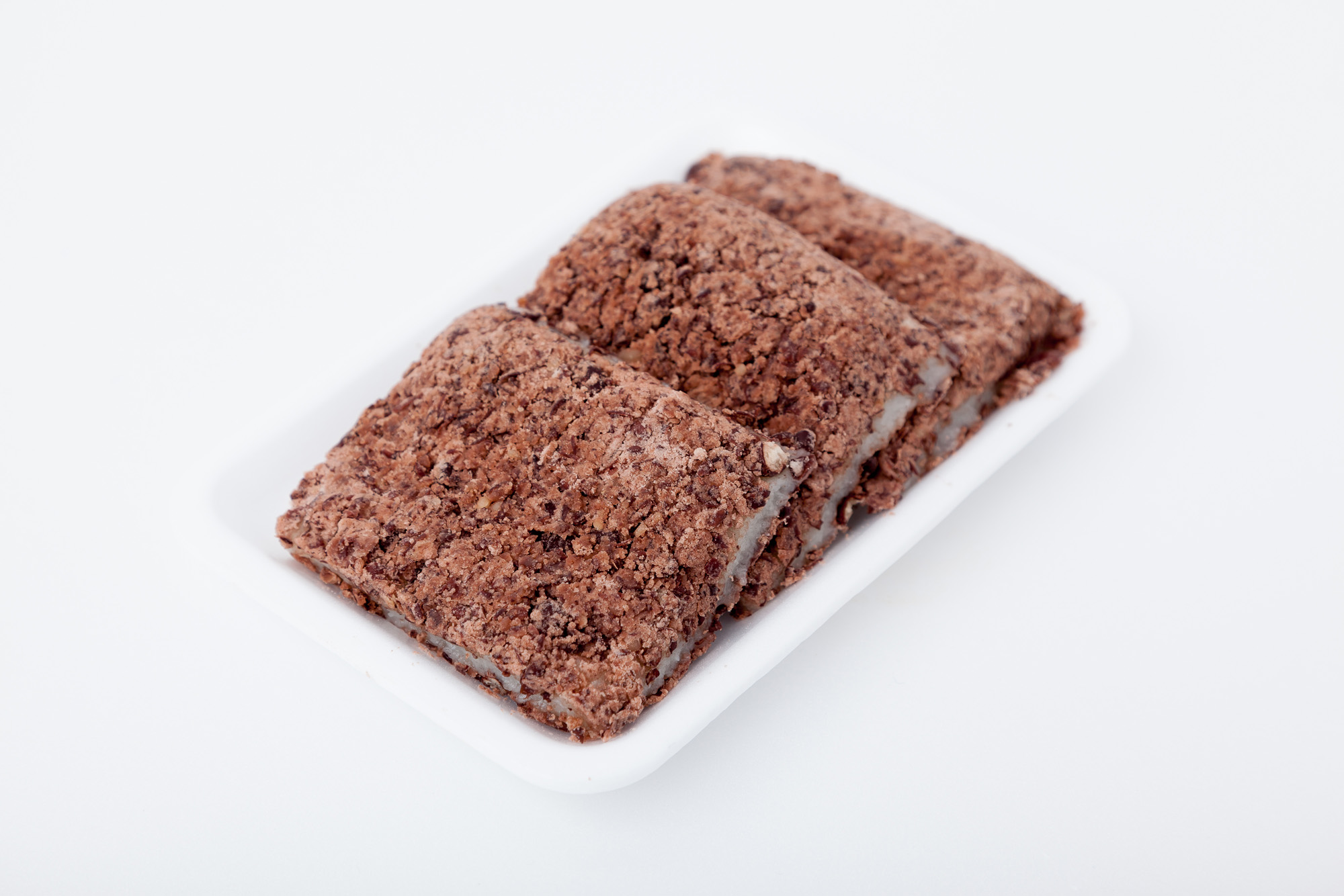
- siru-tteok, steamed tteok made with red bean and rice
- Place of origin: Korea
- Region or state: Korean-speaking areas
- Main ingredients: glutinous rice flour, grains and beans (such as azuki bean, mung bean and sesame, wheat flour or starch)
- Variations: seolgitteok, kyeotteok
- Food energy (per serving): 100g /183kcal

Korean name
- Hangul: 시루떡
- RR: sirutteok
- MR: siruttŏk

Siru-tteok (Korean: 시루떡) is a type of Korean rice cake (tteok) traditionally made by steaming rice or glutinous rice flour in a siru (시루).

The popularity of siru-tteok grew as the usage of siru spread across the Korean peninsula. As it is not an everyday utensil but rather used for preparing sacrificial dishes during rituals, siru-tteok is not a casual dish made to enjoy.

The making of siru-tteok is said to be the oldest form of tteok (떡).

Tteok (떡), or steamed rice cake, which is made by steaming powdered rice, then pounding or rolling the dough, itself dates back to 57 B.C.E, along with the siru. The siru-tteok dish is a layered cake of the glutinous rice that is filled often filled with beans and/or red beans (pat, 팥), and the most seen and basic sacrifice offered in rituals for household gods. This cake is generally used for bad fortune prevention rituals (aengmagi) to bring wealth, luck and health into the households. The red beans / fillings is believed to chase away bad spirits, and the other type of siru-tteok cake is the Baekseolgi, which is pure white, and is offered to the higher gods, including Cheonsin (천신; 天神, Celestial God), Sansin (산신; 山神, Mountain God) and Yongsin (용신; 龍神, Dragon God), reflecting the folk belief that the latter two are considered to be as high up and divine as Cheonsin (천신).

== Preparation ==
siru
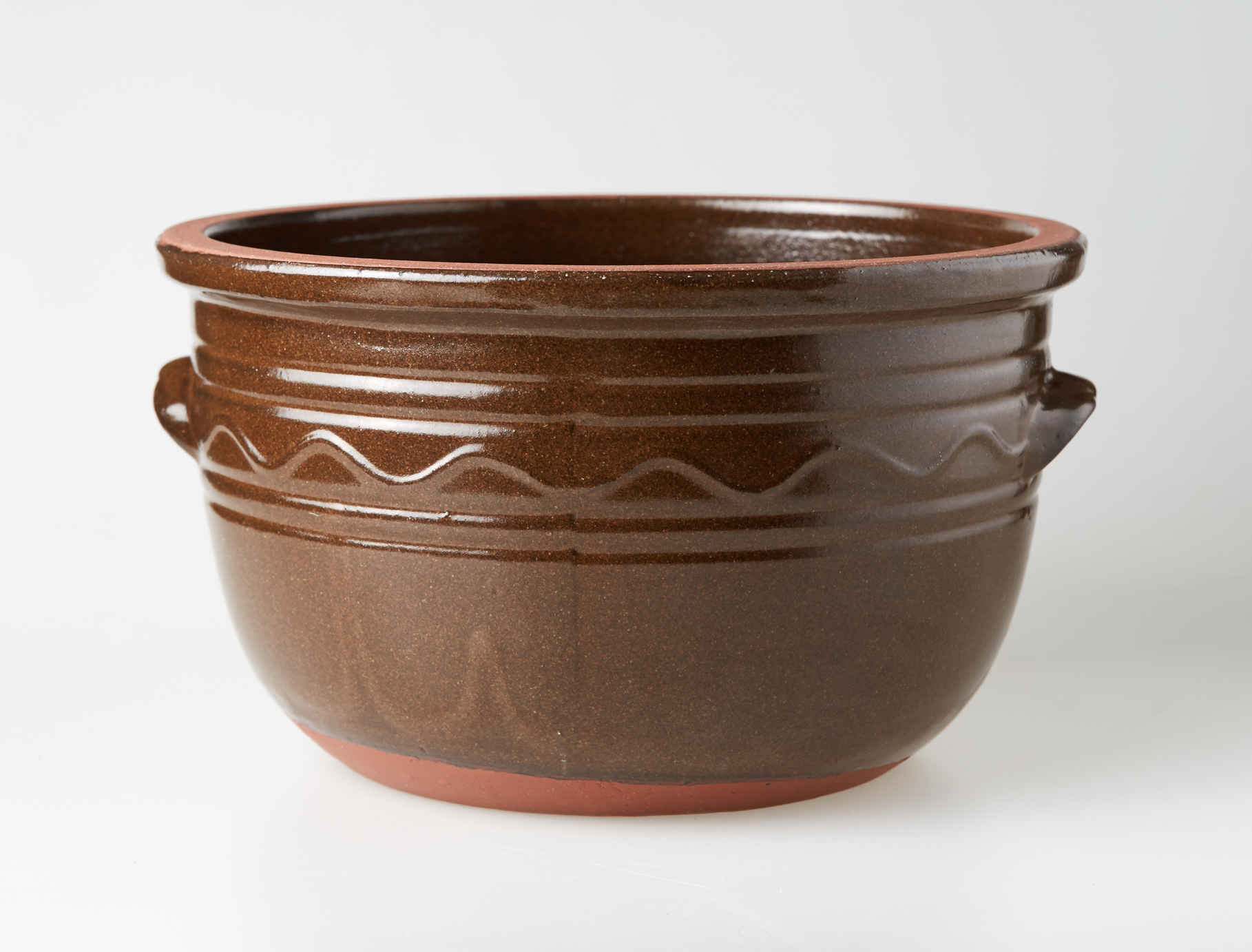
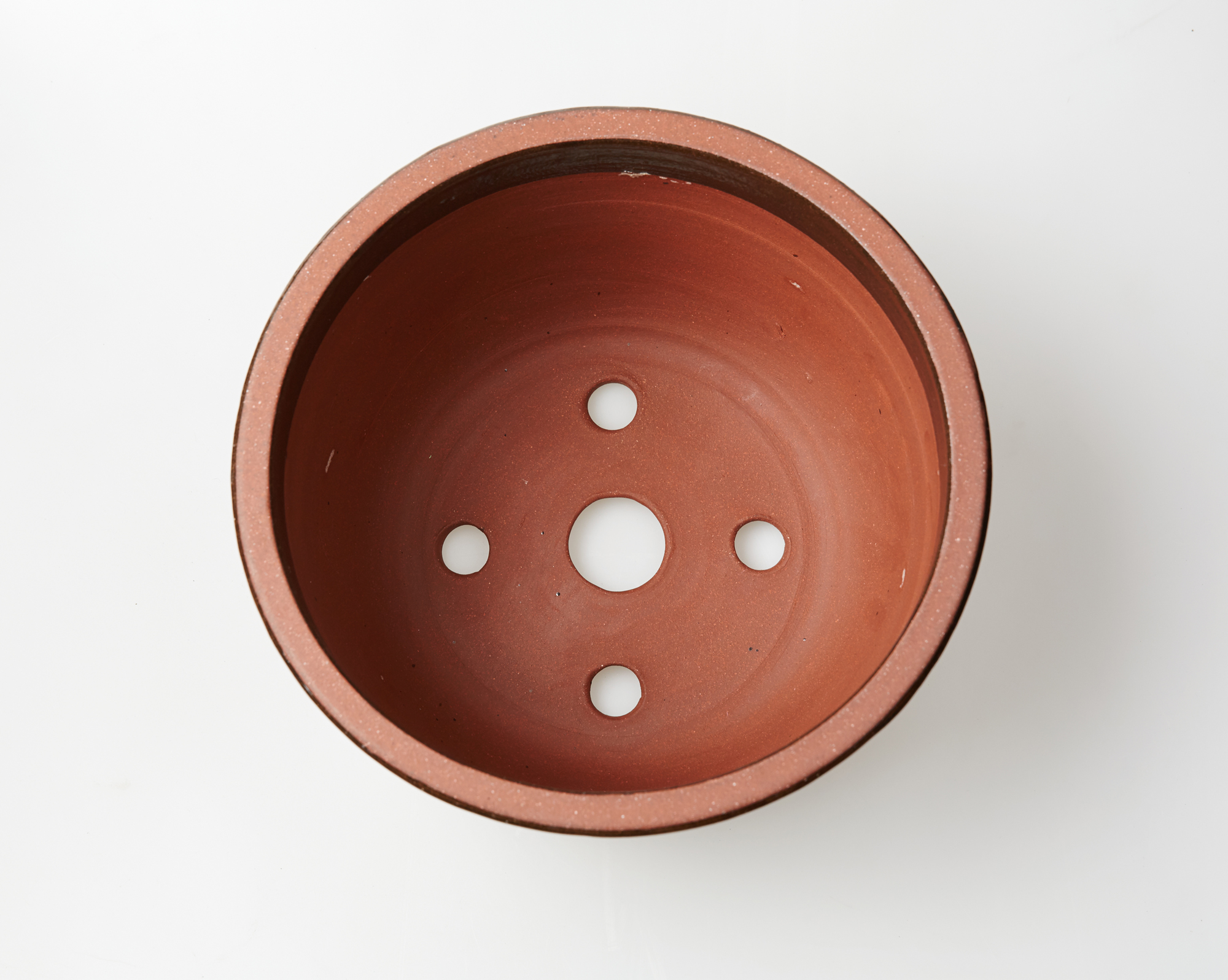

Sirutteok is made by soaking rice or glutinous rice in water and then grinding it. Thus prepared, the rice flour is put in a siru and steamed. According to steaming method, sirutteok is subdivided into two groups: seolgitteok (설기떡) and kyeotteok (켜떡). Seolgitteok---also called muritteok (무리떡)---is regarded as the most basic form of sirutteok and is made only with rice. "Kyeotteok" consists of multiple layers of azuki bean or other bean powder and a rice-glutinous rice mixture.

== Ingredients ==
The main ingredients for "sirutteok" are rice (멥쌀 mepssal in Korean) or glutinous rice (찹쌀 chapssal), which sometimes are mixed. Other grains and beans (such as azuki bean, mung bean and sesame, wheat flour or starch) can also be mixed with the rice. Various fruits and nuts are used as subsidiary ingredients, such as persimmon, peach or apricot, chestnut, walnut, and pine nut. In addition, vegetables or herbs can be used to flavor the tteok. Danggwi leaves (당귀잎; Ostericum grosseserratum), seogi mushroom (manna lichen), radish, artemisia, pepper, and Korean wine for example, whereas honey and sugar are used as sweeteners.

== Varieties ==
- Baekseolgi (백설기) - a variety of siru tteok. It literally means white snow tteok which is made of white rice.
- Kongtteok (콩떡) - tteok made with various kinds of beans
- Jeungpyeon (증편) - tteok made with makgeolli (unfiltered rice wine)
- Mujigae-tteok (무지개떡); this variety of tteok has colorful stripes. The tteok is used especially for janchi (잔치), Korean banquet, party, or feast like dol (celebrating a baby's first birthday), Hwangap (celebrating 60 years old people's birthday), or gyeonhon janchi (wedding party)
- Hobak-tteok (호박떡)

== See also ==
- Songpyeon
- Korean cuisine
- List of steamed foods
