= Rechao =

Style of Taiwanese cuisine

- Traditional Chinese: 熱炒
- Simplified Chinese: 热炒
- Literal meaning: Hot stir-fry
Transcriptions
Standard Mandarin
- Hanyu Pinyin: Rè chǎo
Yue: Cantonese
- Jyutping: Jit^{6} caau^{2}

Kuaichao
- Chinese: 快炒
- Literal meaning: Fast stir-fry
Transcriptions
Standard Mandarin
- Hanyu Pinyin: Kuài chǎo
Yue: Cantonese
- Jyutping: Faai^{3} caau^{2}

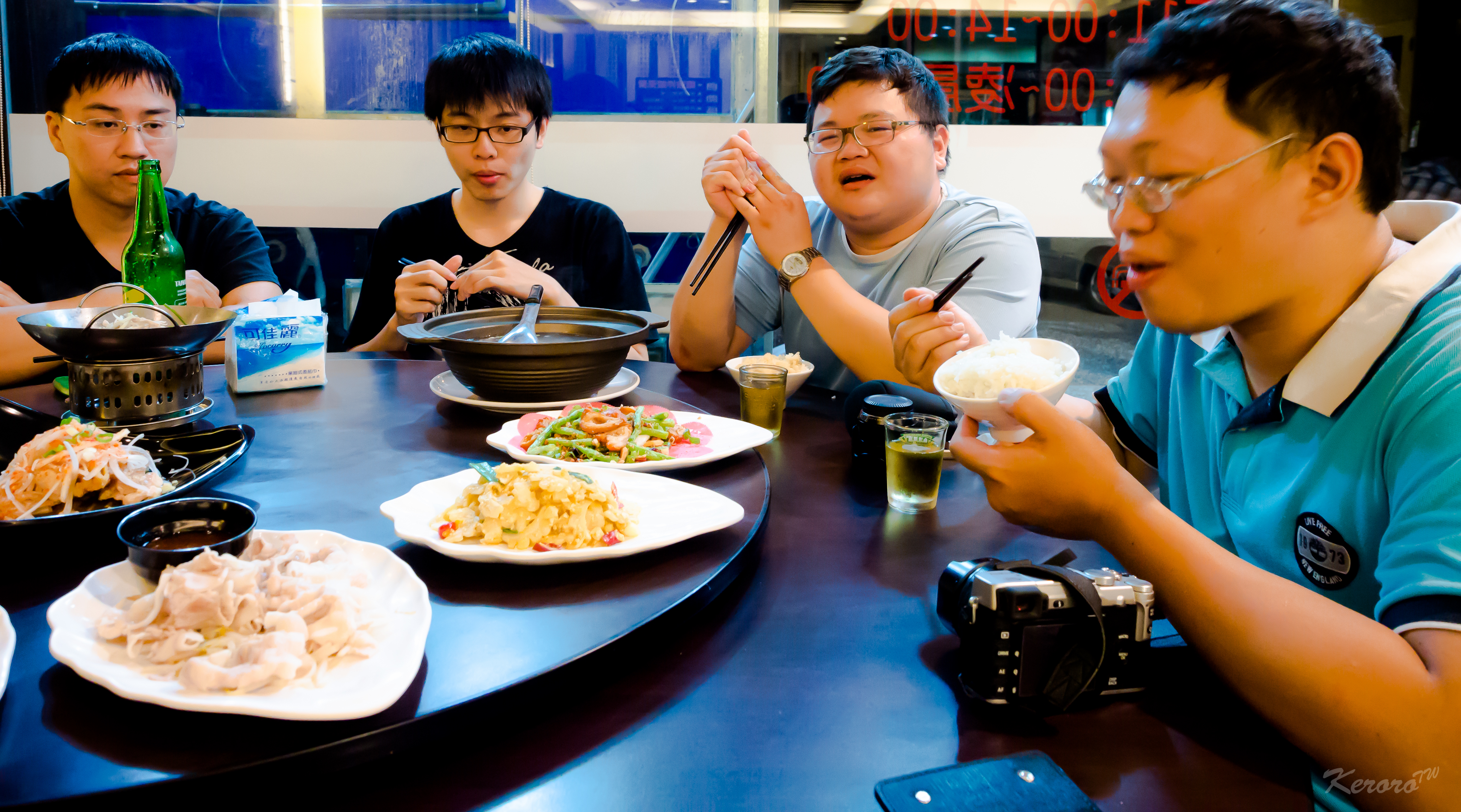
At left, men eating at a rechao restaurant in Baoshan in Taiwan's Hsinchu County. At right, a man leaning on crates of empty beer bottles at a rechao eatery.

Rechao (traditional Chinese: 熱炒; simplified Chinese: 热炒) is a style of Taiwanese cuisine that uses a wok to stir fry food. Rechao combines the Chinese characters for "hot" (Chinese: 熱) and "stir-fry" (Chinese: 炒) and is the Mandarin pronunciation for those characters. It is also known as kuaichao (Chinese: 快炒), which literally means "fast stir-fry". Rechao eateries have been compared to Cantonese-style dim sum eateries, the Japanese bar izakaya, British pubs, Hong Kong's dai pai dong, and night markets in Taiwan.

Rechao restaurants built a significant foothold in Taipei in the 1970s. Originally offering seafood from the nearby port city of Keelung, they later expanded their menu options. During the Taiwan Economic Miracle in the 1980s, the strong economy kept people focused on their jobs and working into the evening. As they finished their work for the day, these workers sought inexpensive and fast food choices. Seafood restaurant owners capitalized on this by converting their businesses into affordable rechao eateries. The modern version of the rechao restaurant emerged in the 1980s once heavy-duty burners operated by gas became available. The struggling economy in the 2000s induced people to avoid fine dining restaurants in favor of cheap options like rechao restaurants, causing a surge in their popularity. Despite their widespread appeal in Taiwan, rechao restaurants remain relatively unknown internationally.

Rechao eateries have simple decor, typically featuring plastic stools and short tables for seating. People of various social backgrounds dine at the venues, which provide a casual atmosphere for them to unwind and connect. Meals can last for several hours, as copious amounts of beer—frequently from the Taiwan Beer brand—is drunk. Rechao menu items are influenced by numerous cultures including Fujianese, Japanese, Korean, Sichuanese, Southeast Asian, and Taiwanese. Dishes contain large helpings of oil and salt which complement beer.

== Etymology ==
The phrase rechao (Chinese: 熱炒) combines the Chinese characters for "hot" (Chinese: 熱) and "stir-fry" (Chinese: 炒) and is the Mandarin pronunciation for those characters. It is employed as a verb and a noun. The name comes from how the food is cooked at a high temperature to exterminate bacteria. Rechao is also known as kuaichao (Chinese: 快炒), which literally means "fast stir-fry". It alludes to how the restaurants attempt to cook and present the dish to customers as swiftly as possible.

== History ==
During the 1970s, rechao eateries established a strong presence in Taipei. Its initial dishes were made of seafood transported from Keelung, a port city situated 30 km (19 mi) from Taipei. The seafood restaurants had fish tanks containing recently procured fish that chefs used to prepare dishes. Rechao restaurants were born as the seafood restaurants began to gradually broaden their menu options. In the midst of the Taiwan Economic Miracle in the 1980s, Taiwan had undergone significant urbanization. As the booming economy kept people busy with work, more street vendors began serving stir-fry dishes. White-collar workers who worked into the evening started seeking inexpensive, fast, and adaptable food options. They frequently chose to dine out for all three of their daily meals and sought budget-friendly spots where they could socialize at the end of the workday. Viewing this as a business opportunity, seafood restaurant owners converted their establishments into inexpensive rechao eateries. The restaurants had air conditioning and decor and allowed customers to sit inside or outside. After heavy-duty burners operated by gas became available in Taiwan in the 1980s, the contemporary version of rechao emerged. Rechao restaurants surged in popularity during the 1990s as employees who had finished their workday sought to relax.

At the start of 1990, the Taiwan Stock Exchange hit a record high. By 2000, the market had dropped substantially owing to international conflicts and the bursting of the dot-com bubble. The poor economic conditions caused people to avoid costly fine dining places which closed down as inexpensive dining options emerged. Taiwan's streets—particularly along Chang'an East Road in Taipei's Zhongshan District—started displaying signs like "NT$100 Live Seafood" (Chinese: 一百活海鮮), "$99 Rechao" (Chinese: 九十九快炒), and "$100 Rechao" (Chinese: 百元熱炒). Restaurant owners in Taipei benefited from their proximity to the nearby Keelung Fish Market—Taiwan's largest fish market—that was fewer than 30 minutes away by car. As they advertised "$100 Live Seafood", they drove in the middle of the night to the fish markets to procure fresh seafood. This allowed the businesses to minimize both procurement and delivery expenses. Another reason for the popularity of rechao restaurants was that urban dwellers considered them to be a haven where they could vent their frustrations after facing constant stress from higher-ups at work. The rechao restaurants offered unlimited free white rice and clear pricing, making customers feel at ease when placing their order. Streets often had multiple rechao restaurants next to each other, which established a vibrant ambiance.

The food writer Clarissa Wei stated that she spent 1.5 years delving into Taiwanese culinary traditions for her cookbook and found that typically infrequent attention is paid to rechao beyond a cursory reference. That is because Taiwan is commonly categorized as having night market food and beef noodle soup, she said. Outside of Taiwan, rechao restaurants have not gained traction. The most recent migration of people from Taiwan happened during the 1980s. This was prior to the rise of rechao, which is why Overseas Taiwanese largely are unfamiliar with it. Wei, the writer, said that the fact that rechao is not widely known makes sense also because Taiwanese cuisine seldom receives attention. When it is referenced, rechao typically is grouped broadly with Chinese cuisine. The rechao dining experience has expanded outside of Taiwan. The rechao restaurant 886 began operations in 2018 in New York City's Lower Manhattan.

Rechao restaurants operate separately from Taiwan's night markets, which do not feature them. The Rough Guides called rechao restaurants "a real Taipei institution". Tainan has large rechao eateries that may occupy the sidewalks. Northern Taiwan has a high concentration of rechao restaurants, though they are widespread across nearly all of the island's significant locales. Chris Horton of The Nikkei called rechao eateries "among the best places" for trying out Taiwanese cuisine. He said they represent a more modest yet truly representative Taiwanese meal compared to Michelin-rated dining establishments. Taipei Medical University professor of food history Kuo Chung-Hao said, "Rechao food is the food of the people." Food writer Clarissa Wei called rechao restaurants "hot, fast, and noisy. Glorious". Ami Barnes of Travel in Taiwan found rechao eateries to play a crucial function in the culinary scene of Taiwan and are "unpretentious [and] sociable".

== Comparison to other dining cultures ==
Chris Horton of The Nikkei compared rechao restaurants to Cantonese-style dim sum eateries and izakaya, a Japanese bar. Writing for The World of Chinese, Terence Hsieh compared rechao restaurants to night markets in Taiwan. He said that whereas night markets embody Taiwanese culture's trendy side, rechao restaurants are their grittier, more rough-edged urban counterparts. According to the food writer Clarissa Wei, rechao eateries were like the pub in Great Britain and the izakaya in Japan in being a social spot for gathering and having drinks. She said that the restaurants deserve "the same unilateral, unitalicized recognition" that izakayas and the dai pai dong in Hong Kong receive. According to Wei, rechao restaurants give diners a night market's sensory pleasures while not having to maneuver past a sea of people. She frequented rechao eateries with her friends to unwind to avoid the discomfort of traversing a night market filled with tourists during warm temperatures. The Straits Times food critic Foong Woei Wan said Taiwanese rechao eateries reside in an "alternative universe" from comparable Singaporean establishments.

== Dining style and ambience ==
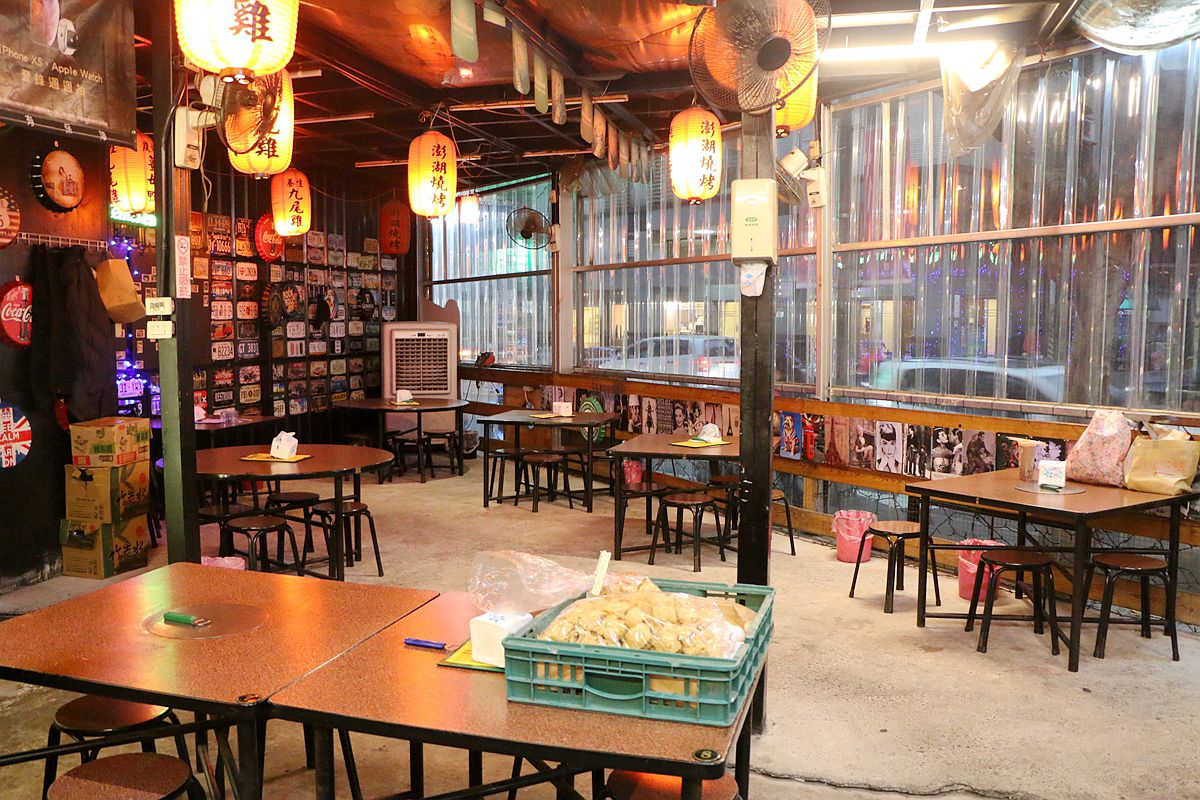
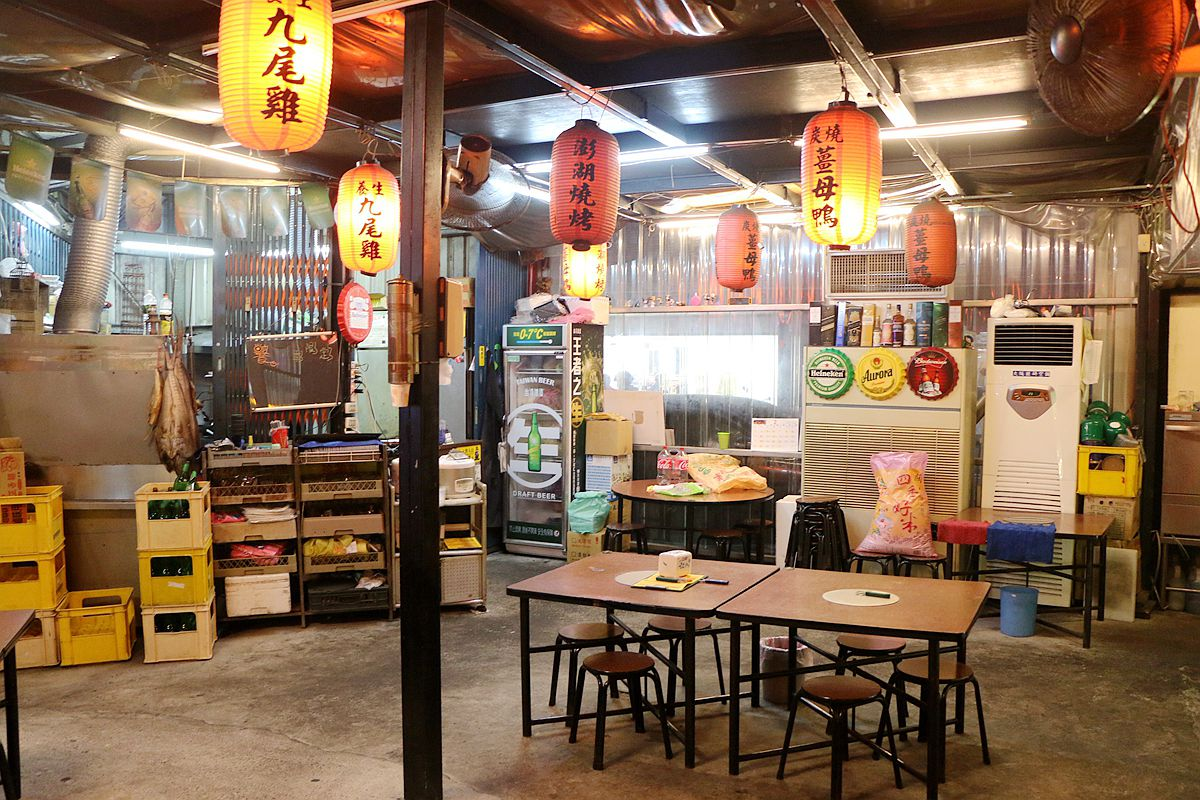
The interior of a rechao eatery in the Zhonghe District of New Taipei City

Rechao eateries are a blend of budget-friendly dining spots and pubs. They draw diners from various social backgrounds. Rechao restaurants typically offer diners seating on plastic stools at short tables. Seats generally are set up outside by the road, below an underpass, in vacant lots, or on sidewalks. The eateries have plain decor. Typically located next to bustling intersections or at street corners, the restaurants have vivid red and yellow latterns arranged similarly to Christmas lights. It can be physically challenging to eat at rechao restaurants as customers frequently are packed closely together and become sweaty from Taiwan's humidity. The Taipei Times's Ho Yi typically steered clear of rechao establishments owing to the unclean environment and uncertain sanitation protocols. Ho did not like that intoxicated males would chain smoke as they loudly engaged in drinking games.

Diners drink substantial amounts of beer, usually from the Taiwan Beer brand. According to a 2023 article and book, almost 45% of Taiwan's beer purchases comes from rechao restaurants. Attractive beer saleswomen receive compensation to sell specific beer brands. Wearing low-cut shirts and short skirts, they visit each table to market the beer brand, serve the beverage into tiny shot glasses, and top off the cups. The women play a major role in generating profits for both the rechao restaurant and the beer suppliers. A rechao restaurant's ambiance often is very vibrant. The restaurants operate well into the night. The Linsen Park in Taipei's Zhongshan District has numerous well-known rechao restaurants that stay open after 1 am.

Rechao establishments create settings for numerous Taiwanese to connect with each other, dining and conversing amid the sound of glasses clinking and woks sizzling. They may linger at the same place for several hours while consuming food and beverages. The rechao restaurant's open space lets diners relax, laugh, and converse and allow them to foster deep connections with each other. It is among the favorite places for young people looking for a laid-back meeting spot. The youth meet to share amusing stories from school and to cultivate responsible drinking habits. While casually enjoying drinks, middle-aged patrons reminisce about their accomplishments and discuss Taiwan's current events and politics. When conversations get heated, friends refill each other's drinks. To relieve stress, they down beers while sharing their work frustrations. Diners play the Taiwanese drinking game "guess fingers" (Chinese: 划酒拳). Friends and workmates eat delicious food while engaging in light-hearted conversations. Couples end their relationships there, while friends share rumors and coworkers vent their frustrations.

According to the food writer Clarissa Wei, the Taiwanese people are known for their restrained and unapologetically courteous demeanor. She said that during the rechao experience, they reveal their real identities. Wei witnessed side-splitting laughter powerful enough to cause beer to spray from people's nostrils and intoxicated adult males falling face-first onto several tables. She observed a parade of pink-faced diners who had not met before celebrating together just because the week has concluded. Wei concluded that like just as in every culture, food and sufficient alcoholic beverages unites humans, and "the rechao experience in Taiwan—hot, noisy, and messy, in all its glory—remains my all-time favorite".

== Food ==
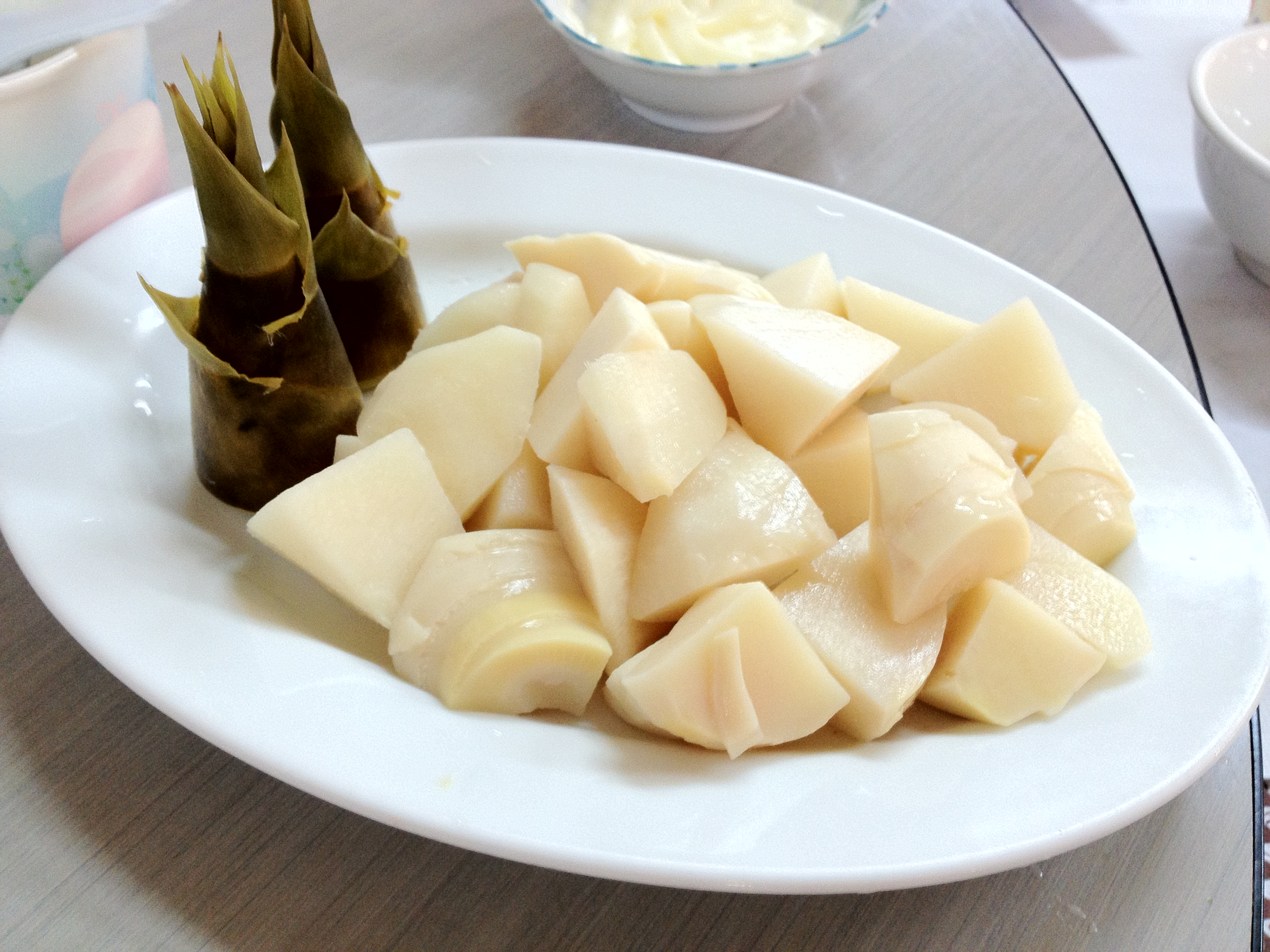
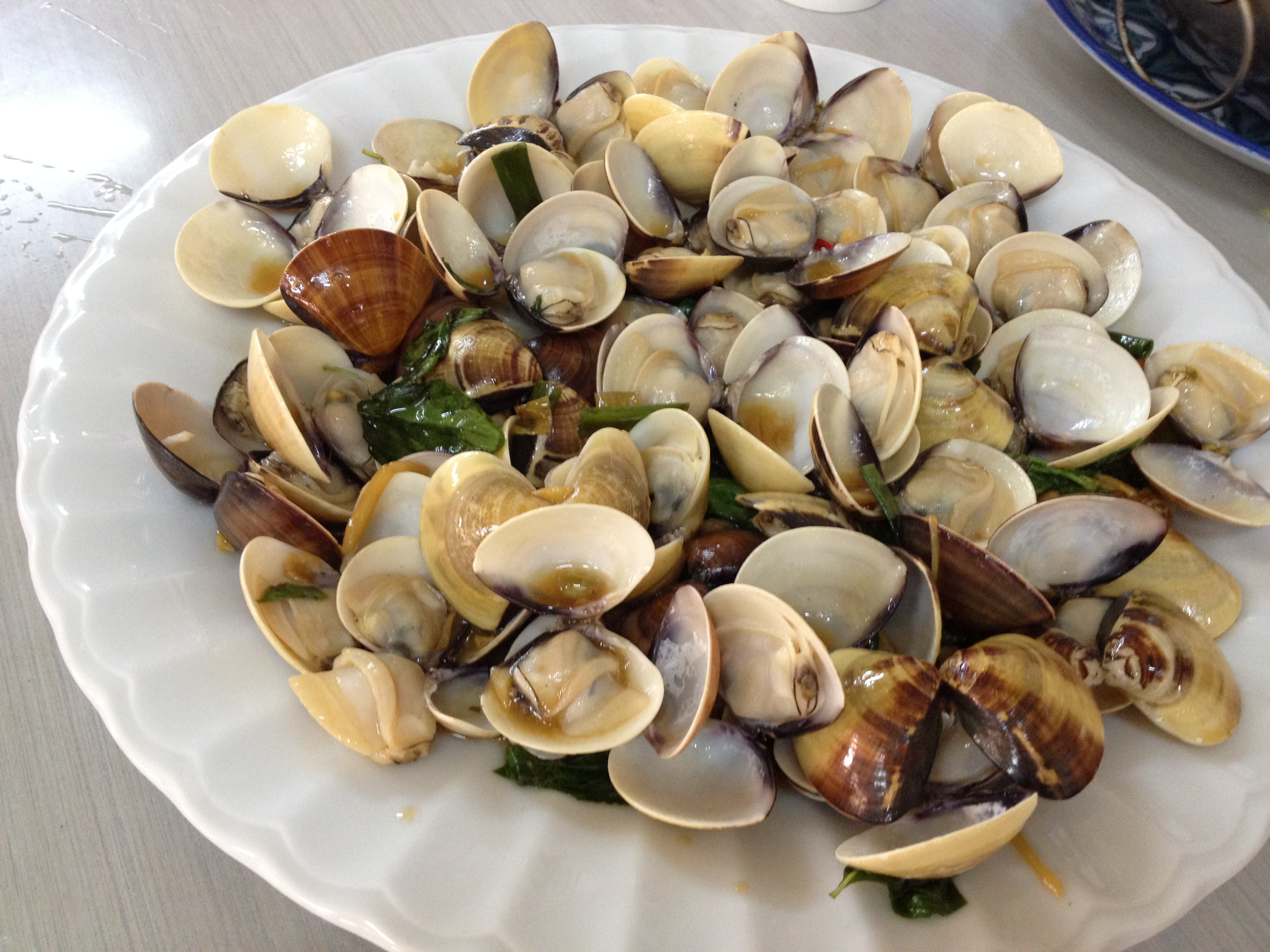
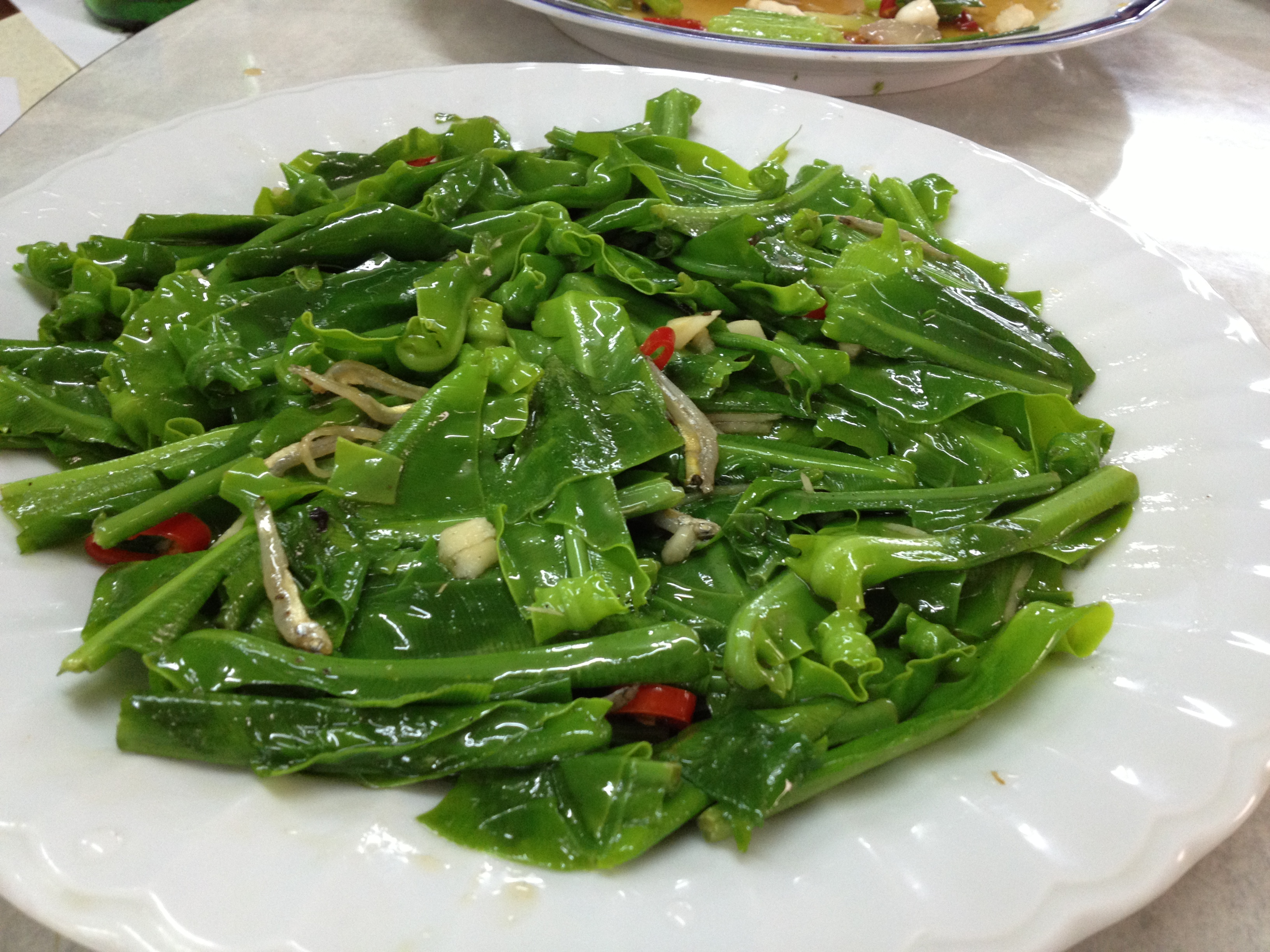
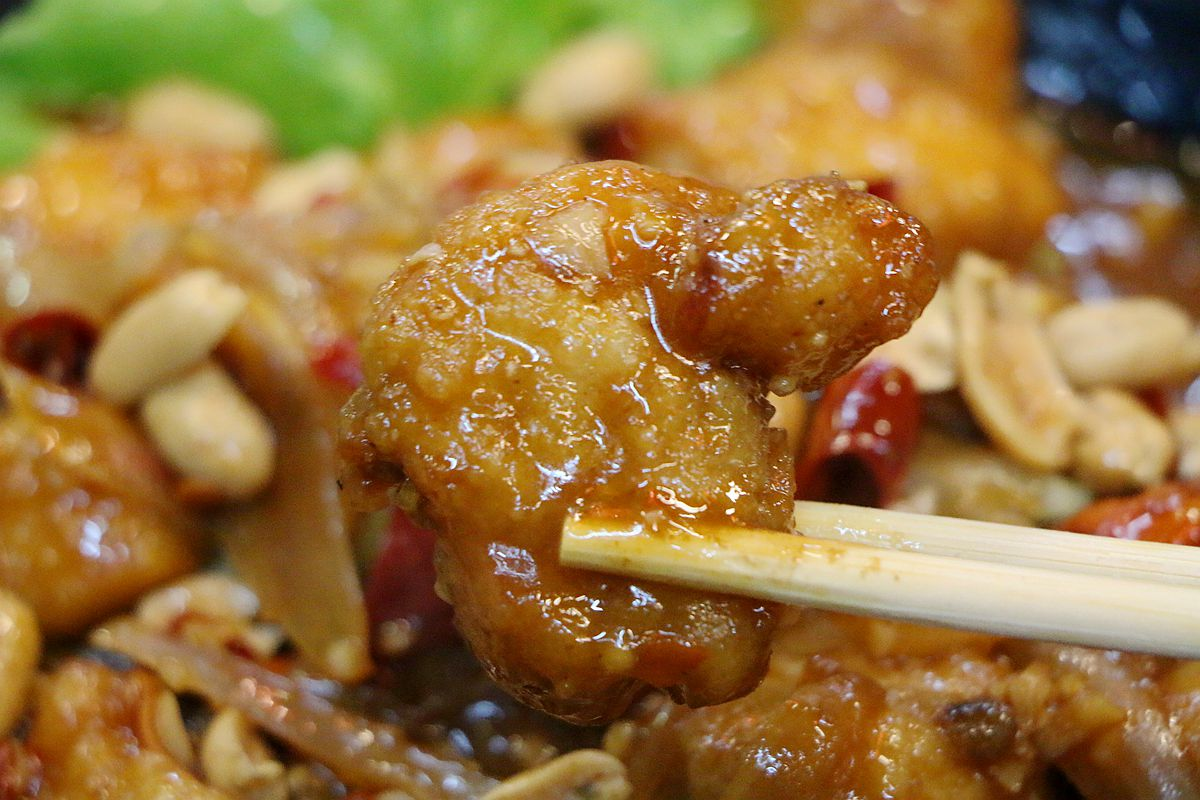
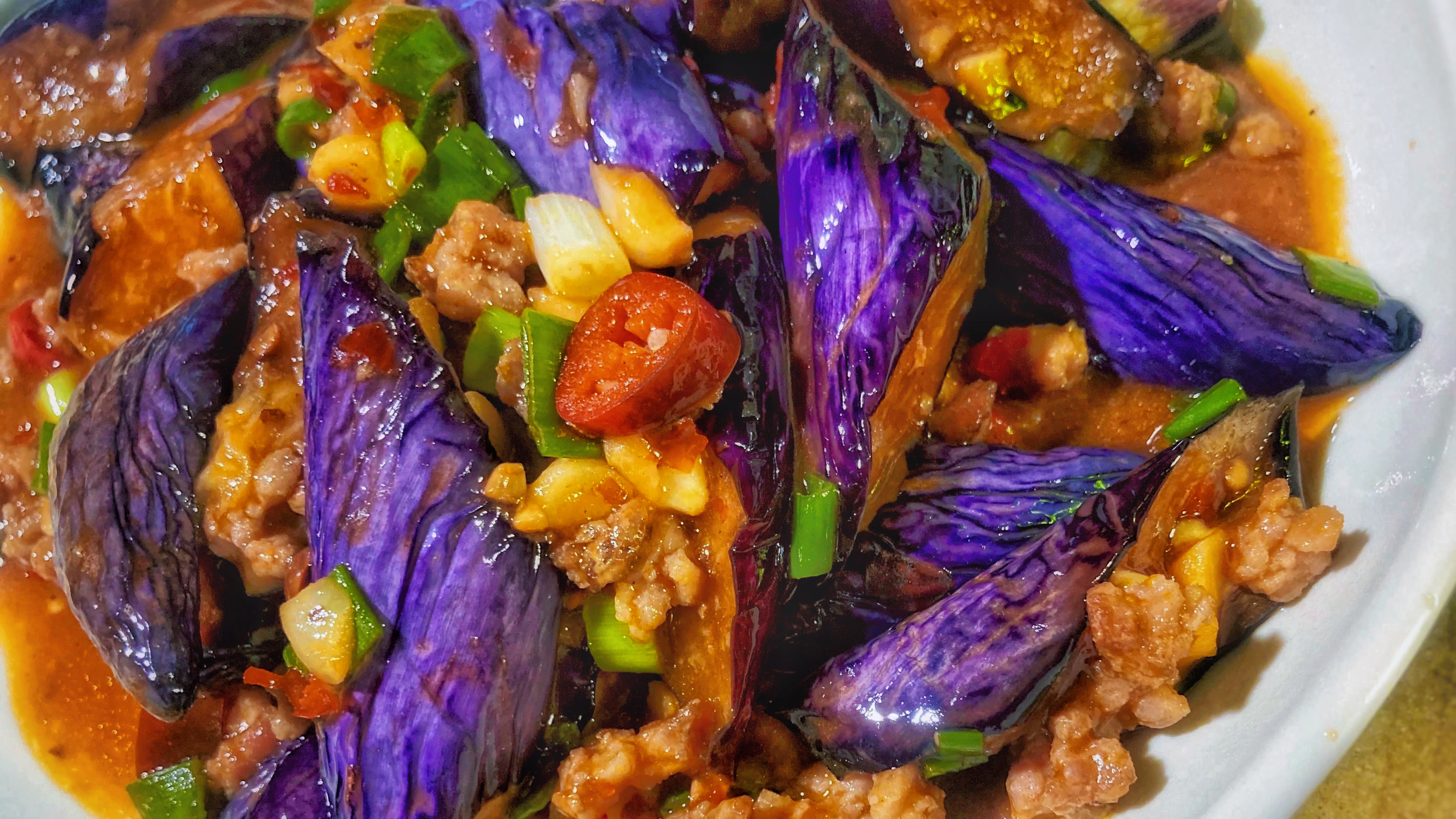
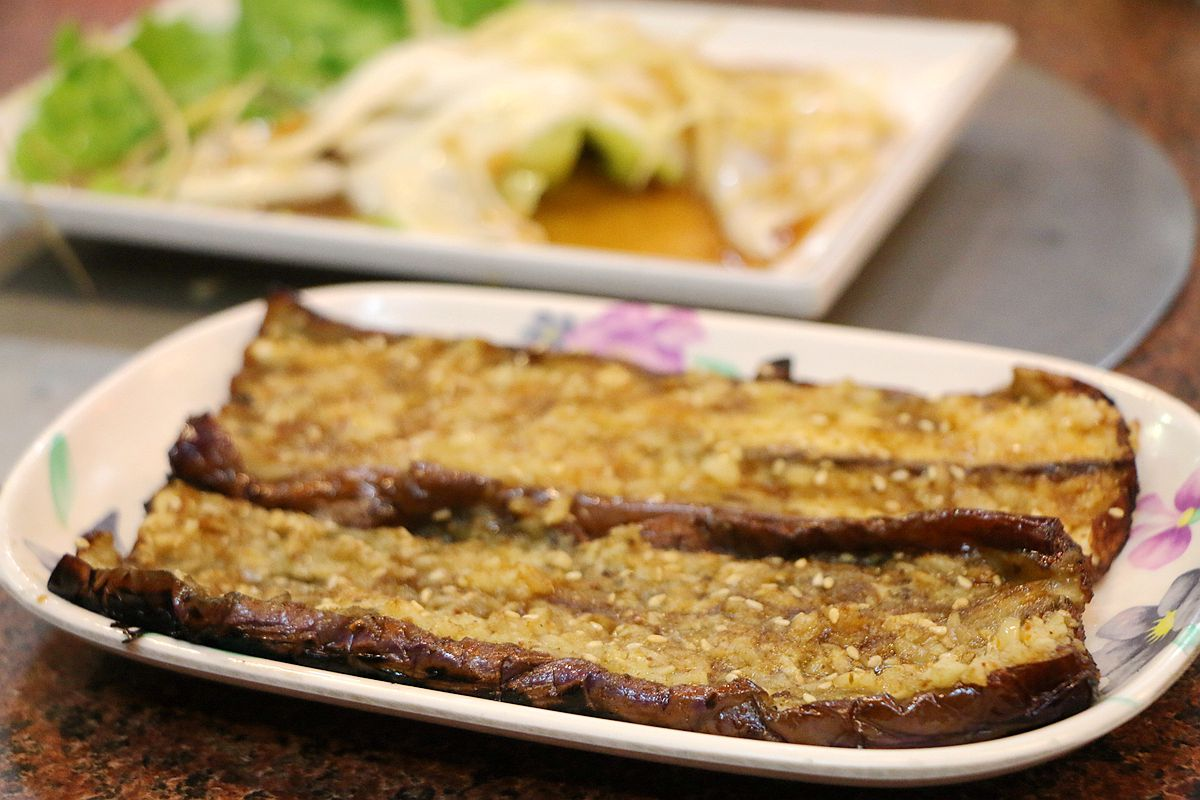
Bamboo shoots, clams, stir-fried vegetables, meat, eggplant, and eggplant with pork served at rechao restaurants

The primary cooking techniques at rechao eateries are frying, deep frying, grilling, and boiling. Rechao dishes are typically cooked in large woks powered by strong stoves. The food writer Fan Qiaoxin attributed the rechao restaurant's success to wok hei. Frying the food over high temperatures give the dishes a lightly charred taste. The chefs cranks up the stove to the highest temperature to rapidly stir fry the dishes. Served quickly, the steaming dishes are filled with salt and have several levels of umami. The food is crafted to complement beer and designed to appeal to a diverse crowd. Food writer Clarissa Wei wrote that rechao dishes convey a unified narrative of "what it means to be Taiwanese, an identity that is multicultural and nuanced". Rechao dishes are a prominent outlier from Taiwanese food that generally is not heavy on salt or spiciness. They have generous amounts of oil and salt to complement beverages like beer. Many of the items include chili pepper—though only the tamest kinds—as ingredients. All the dishes include generous sprinklings of white pepper and salt.

The food highlights Taiwan's plentiful supply of harvests, protein, and seafood. Rechao restaurants offer dishes featuring, meat, vegetables, and seafood. Vegetable dishes like fried burdock root and stir-fried ferns are served. Recently caught seafood is a significant hallmark of the rechao experience. A number of rechao restaurants have fish tanks that allow customers to select the fish, shellfish, shrimp, crabs, and clams to be prepared by the restaurant. Set on ice, fresh food like vegetables, chicken, and squid can be chosen by customers. Several rechao restaurants let diners provide fish they have personally procured. Seafood dishes include oysters that are deep fried, squid that is grilled, garlic-coated clams that are stir-fried, sweet and sour fish that is deep fried, and grilled oilfish seasoned with miso. Meat dishes include three-cup chicken; a stir fry of beef and pepper; pork neck; and clay pot chicken stewed with sesame oil, rice wine, and soy sauce. Numerous rechao restaurants serve sashimi and fried rice, while some serve French fries.

Rechao menu items are inspired by the culinary traditions from numerous cultures including Fujianese, Japanese, Korean, Sichuanese, Southeast Asian, and Taiwanese. Japan's cultural impact on Taiwan is reflected through how rechao restaurants offer sashimi accompanied by a small amount of wasabi. Different varieties of teppanyaki dishes are served. A beef tenderloin dish fuses bell peppers and onions from Western cuisine with a signature Taiwanese black pepper sauce. Other teppanyaki dishes are made with ostrich meat. Instead of being a direct reproduction of dishes from other regions, some rechao dishes showcase a Taiwanese flair. For instance, for several thousand years, Sichuanese people made poached pork belly coated in soy sauce and chili oil. The Taiwanese produced a slightly sweeter dish by instead drenching it in ginger and soy paste.

Clarissa Wei, the food writer, said the blend of cuisines that influence rechao causes there to be dishes that exist nowhere else globally. She cited shrimp that is deep-fried and accompanied by colorful sprinkles, pineapple, and mayonnaise. A second dish she highlighted was a stir fry of tofu, celery, dried shredded squid, and pork as well as pork sausage that is grilled. A third dish she cited was the maqaw-enriched pork sausages. Having traces of lemon and pepper, maqaw is native to Taiwan. Wei highlighted a fourth dish containing stir-fried ferns that are accompanied by birdlime tree seeds. Taiwan's subtropical conditions allow ferns to grow naturally and in great numbers. In a public opinion analysis, DailyView in 2024 listed the top 10 rechao dishes as sashimi; pineapple shrimp balls; Kung Pao chicken; stir-fried cabbage; fried egg with radish; three-cup chicken; Hakka stir-fry containing squid, pork belly, and tofu; wu geng chang wang (spicy duck blood and intestines); stir-fried beef with scallions; and stir-fried clams.

== Cost ==
The World of Chinese writer Terence Hsieh said in 2020 that for numerous rechao restaurants, all dishes are priced under NT$150 (US$5), while food writer Clarissa Wei stated in 2023 that the final bill per individual from her observations is around NT$419 (US$15). Wei said this cost much more than a typical Taipei dinner outing but remained affordable in the context of being a "rare elongated social activity" where diners linger for several hours.

== Rechao restaurants ==
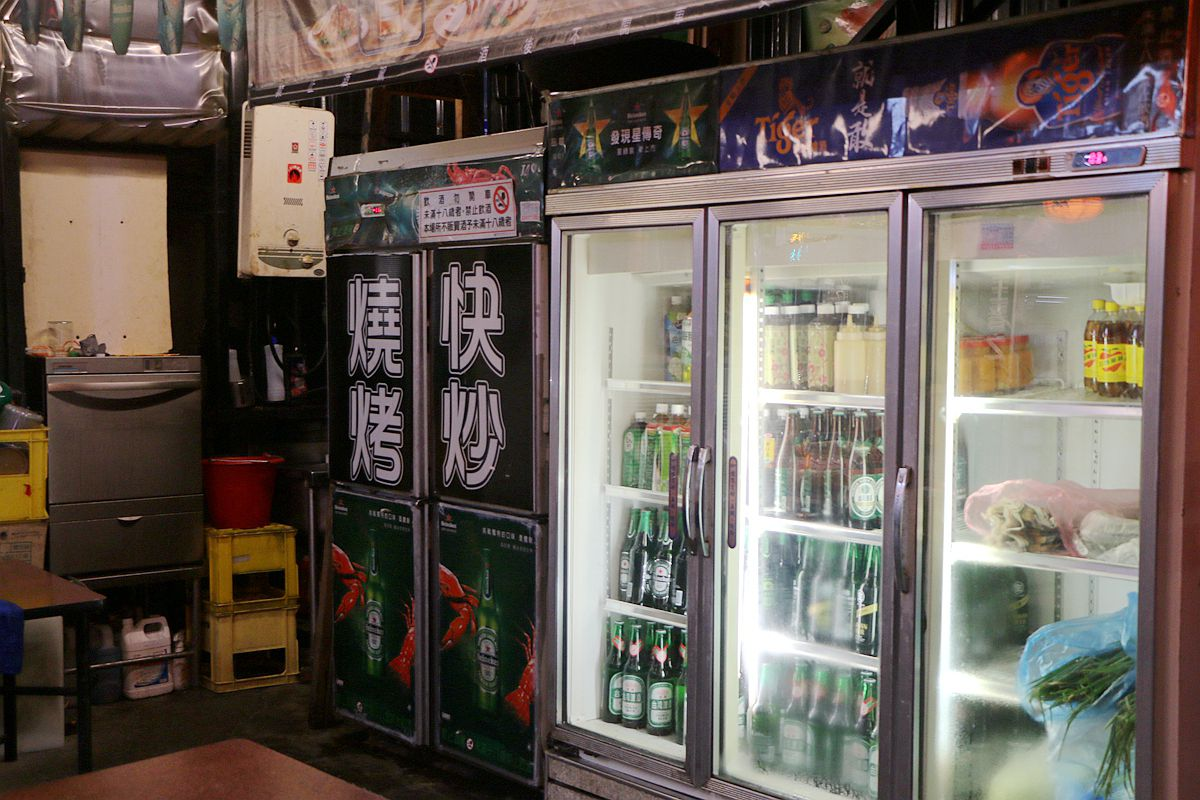
A rechao restaurant's beverage refrigerators

Eight Immortals Barbeque Grill or Baxian Grill (Chinese: 八仙碳烤), a Taipei rechao eatery close to Daan Forest Park, incorporates elements of both Chinese and Japanese cuisine. Japanese-inspired dishes like yam salad and mayonnaise-covered bamboo shoots and Chinese dishes like stinky tofu were on its menu in 2019. Other dishes it offered in 2023 were ginger-infused fiddleheads, clams drenched in rice wine, a chicken casserole covered in basil, and fried rice containing pork pieces. Pin Xian (Chinese: 品鱻), a rechao restaurant in Taipei, in 2020 served pork liver strips that are pan fried and coated in a sweet sauce, bitter melon alongside salted duck egg, omelets that are pan fried with basil, and clams stir fried using peppers and black bean sauce. Other dishes it served were salmon sashimi, garlic-infused watercress, pork boiled and accompanied with cilantro and garlic sauce, tofu that is deep fried, and cod steamed and garnished with soy sauce, peppers, ginger, garlic, and soybeans.

One Jiang is a more upscale rechao restaurant in Taichung. It in 2020 served sweet and sour pork ribs, tornado omelets seasoned with fish sauce, large orange shrimp, oysters deep fried and complemented by basil, bitter melon deep fried and topped with peanuts, seafood hot pot, and eggs with cabbage. At the Aowanda National Forest Recreation Area in Nantou County, the Red Resort Village Restaurant has a menu with items usually available in rechao eateries. Dishes in 2020 included fish that has been deep fried, braised pork belly with a side of pickled vegetables, sautéed mushrooms and other vegetables, tofu that has been braised, and scallion-seasoned fried chicken.

Fat Man Eatery (Chinese: 胖子小吃部) is a rechao eatery in Taipei's Songshan District founded by a former casino tycoon. Established by Hu Ching-Chung (Chinese: 胡慶忠), it began as a street vendor. The food writer Clarissa Wei said that through his charismatic personality and his wife's exceptional culinary skills, Fat Man Eatery evolved into a rechao establishment. By 2023, their son, Hu Nei-Ta (Chinese: 胡內達), had become the co-owner and chef of the rechao. The younger Hu said that food is cooked in a massive wok owing to the wok's efficiency. Lin Mei Ru Seafood Stir Fry Restaurant (Chinese: 林美如海鮮熱炒) is a fusion rechao and izakaya establishment in Taipei's Zhongshan District. The restaurant's name, "Lin Mei Ru", is similar to "drink beer" in Taiwanese. Quotes related to drinking alcohol adorn the ceiling and walls. In a nod to its fusion identity, the restaurant serves Taiwan Beer and Japanese beers from the Orion and Sapporo breweries. Equipped with a fish tank, the restaurant has numerous seafood dishes and over 100 dishes on its menu. It in 2023 served traditional rechao dishes as well as sashimi, threadfin, and izakaya light bites.

Chao Stir Fry (Chinese: 炒炒蔬食熱炒) is a vegan rechao eatery in Taipei's Daan District. The establishment's entrance features a vegan fish tank. Chao plays a mixture of Mandopop and Taiwanese pop. Diners sit on red stools at black tables with chrome finishes, matching the colors used at a typical rechao eatery. Its menu in 2022 included the typical rechao dishes of bitter melon soup, fried noodles, green beans, mapo tofu, and Kung Pao "chicken". It put a twist on some traditional dishes, changing three-cup chicken into three-cup mushroom as well as sweet and sour pork into sweet and sour "fish". Rather than using real meat or fish, soy or mushroom alternatives are substituted for protein. According to the food writer Clarissa Wei, it would be quite common for the restaurant to be patronized at the same time by nuns at one table and businessmen drinking beer at another table. Ten Seafood Restaurant (Chinese: 田僑海鮮餐館) is a rechao eatery in the Hengchun township of Pingtung County in southern Taiwan. Its dishes include three-cup chicken and the less typical items like yu lai gu, which is similar to black fungus.

Xanadu (Chinese: 鮮納肚) was a rechao in the Eastern District of Taipei. It had beer saleswomen, featured numerous offal menu items, and had a comprehensive seafood selection. Drunken Monkey (Chinese: 醉悟空格鬥熱炒) was a rechao restaurant in Taipei that offered traditional rechao dishes as well as Cantonese and Western dishes. It was founded in 2011 by Alex Holliday, whose grandfather had moved to Vancouver to start the Capilano Heights Chinese Restaurant after fleeing China during the Chinese Civil War. His grandfather taught Holliday how to make Cantonese dishes. Rechao dishes the eatery served in 2012 were oysters that were deep fried, prawns that were deep fried alongside pineapple, Kung Pao chicken, and clams covered in basil. Western dishes included chicken nuggets and onion rings. Cantonese dishes included fried pork coated in batter, scallions and tofu, and beef mixed with scallions and tofu. Adopting a retro look, the restaurant featured illustrations of tales from Chinese mythology and black-and-white photos of the restaurant his grandfather founded. Customers sat at yellow tables surrounded by stools and wrote their thoughts on the walls.

The rechao restaurant 886 was established in 2018 by Eric Sze and Andy Chuang and in the East Village neighborhood of New York City's Lower Manhattan. The restaurant's name was inspired by Taiwan's calling code. Americans, Taiwanese expatriates, and tourists dine at the restaurant. Reflecting a typical Taiwanese eatery, the restaurant features vibrant neon lighting and a lively atmosphere and also imports beer glasses, plastic chairs, and metal folding tables from Taiwan. Customers in 2019 could order Taiwanese comfort food like oyster omelettes, sausages and glutinous rice, pineapple and shrimp balls stir-fried together, and rice topped with braised pork belly. That year, it served chicken wings and chicken burgers containing daikon and ketchup. The two flavors of beers it offered that year were both from Taiwan Beer: a gold branded lager and a lychee beer.

== Bibliography ==
- Fan, Qiaoxin 范僑芯 (2021). "都市人溫暖的港灣 百元熱炒店" [A Warm Harbor for Urbanites: 100-Dollar Rechao Restaurants]. 巷弄裡的台灣味：22道庶民美食與它們的故事 [The Flavors of Taiwan in the Alley: 22 Popular Dishes and Their Stories] (in Chinese). Taipei: China Times Publishing Company. pp. 111–126. ISBN 978-957-13-8533-4.
