= The Struggle for Taiwan =

2024 book by Sulmaan Wasif Khan

The Struggle for Taiwan: A History of America, China, and the Island Caught Between
- Author: Sulmaan Wasif Khan
- Language: English
- Subject: History of Taiwan, Politics of Taiwan, Cross-strait relations, Political status of Taiwan
- Publisher: Hachette UK
- Publication date: 14 May 2024
- Publication place: United Kingdom
- Media type: Print (hardcover)
- Pages: 336
- ISBN: 9780241674857

The Struggle for Taiwan: A History of America, China, and the Island Caught Between is a 2024 nonfiction book about Taiwan by Sulmaan Wasif Khan. The book focuses on the historical development of Taiwan's political status by discussing the country's democratization process and the evolution of United States' policy towards it.

== Reception ==
In May 2024, Charlie English writing for The Guardian described the book as a "deeply researched and fascinating history" and how the risky situation is caused by "superpower rivalry and diplomatic failures".

Jeremy Brown, writing for The Times Literary Supplement, wrote that "(e)xamining the options that presidents, generals and diplomats considered but chose not to pursue is a fruitful exercise that makes for exciting reading".

In August 2024, James Baron, writing for the Taipei Times, was more critical of the book by writing that "the text sometimes betrays a limited familiarity with Taiwan: incomplete presentations of important incidents, a tenuous grasp of contemporary society, and basic errors, all of which many non-academic, long-term residents of Taiwan would notice".

== See also ==
- History of Taiwan
- Political status of Taiwan
- Cross-Strait relations
- Foreign relations of Taiwan
- Taiwan under Japanese rule
- Taiwan: A Contested Democracy Under Threat
- Defending Taiwan: A Strategy to Prevent War with China
