= The Transpacific Experiment =

2019 non-fiction book by Matt Sheehan

- First edition
- Author: Matt Sheehan
- Language: English
- Genre: Non-fiction
- Publisher: Counterpoint
- Publication date: 2019
- Publication place: United States

The Transpacific Experiment: How China and California Collaborate and Compete for Our Future is a 2019 non-fiction book by Matt Sheehan. It examines the commercial relationship between China and the U.S. state of California.

== Background ==
Sheehan originated from Palo Alto, California, and was educated in California. He lived in China for five years. At the time of publication Sheehan was working for a California think tank.

== Contents ==
Randall Stross, a professor at San Jose State University, stated in the Wall Street Journal that "The author narrowly focuses only on China and the state of California" and that it is mostly made up of vignettes featuring different unconnected persons.

A portion of the book discusses how major internet corporations emerged in China despite the existence of the Great Leap Forward. Other sections include one about the Hengdian (横店镇) settlement in Dongyang, Zhejiang, a center for the Chinese film industry, as well as initiatives of the mayor of a California city trying to get a factory from a Chinese company, and one on Chinese American Donald Trump supporters.

According to Stross, while Sheehan refers to certain sources, the book lacks citations.

Sam Davies of The World of Chinese wrote that the author "suggests the dynamics of engagement between California and China are shifting as Chinese become richer and more confident. Both sides have become more pragmatic and, more recently, guarded." Davies stated that Sheehan "takes pains to provide both sides of the story."

== Reception ==
Overall Stross believed that while it was urgent for a work that examines the relationship between China and the United States, the book "does not uncover enough good stories, nor spend enough time with its subjects, to realize that promise." Stross, citing the portion of the book discussing Hengdian, wrote that "Some anecdotes in the book are entertaining in themselves."

Davies stated that the book's main "oversight" is the "lack of any prescriptions, or even general principles on how to encourage more of the positive engagement he describes". Davies added that the author's has a major strength in "identifying the big problems" and sometimes also in "digging into the finer details" and that "The book is strongest when Sheehan spends more time with individual characters and their stories."

Kirkus Reviews stated that the book is "Timely reading in an era of looming trade wars and the decline of American economic supremacy. "

== See also ==
- China-United States relations
