= Liberty Times =

Taiwanese daily newspaper

The Liberty Times

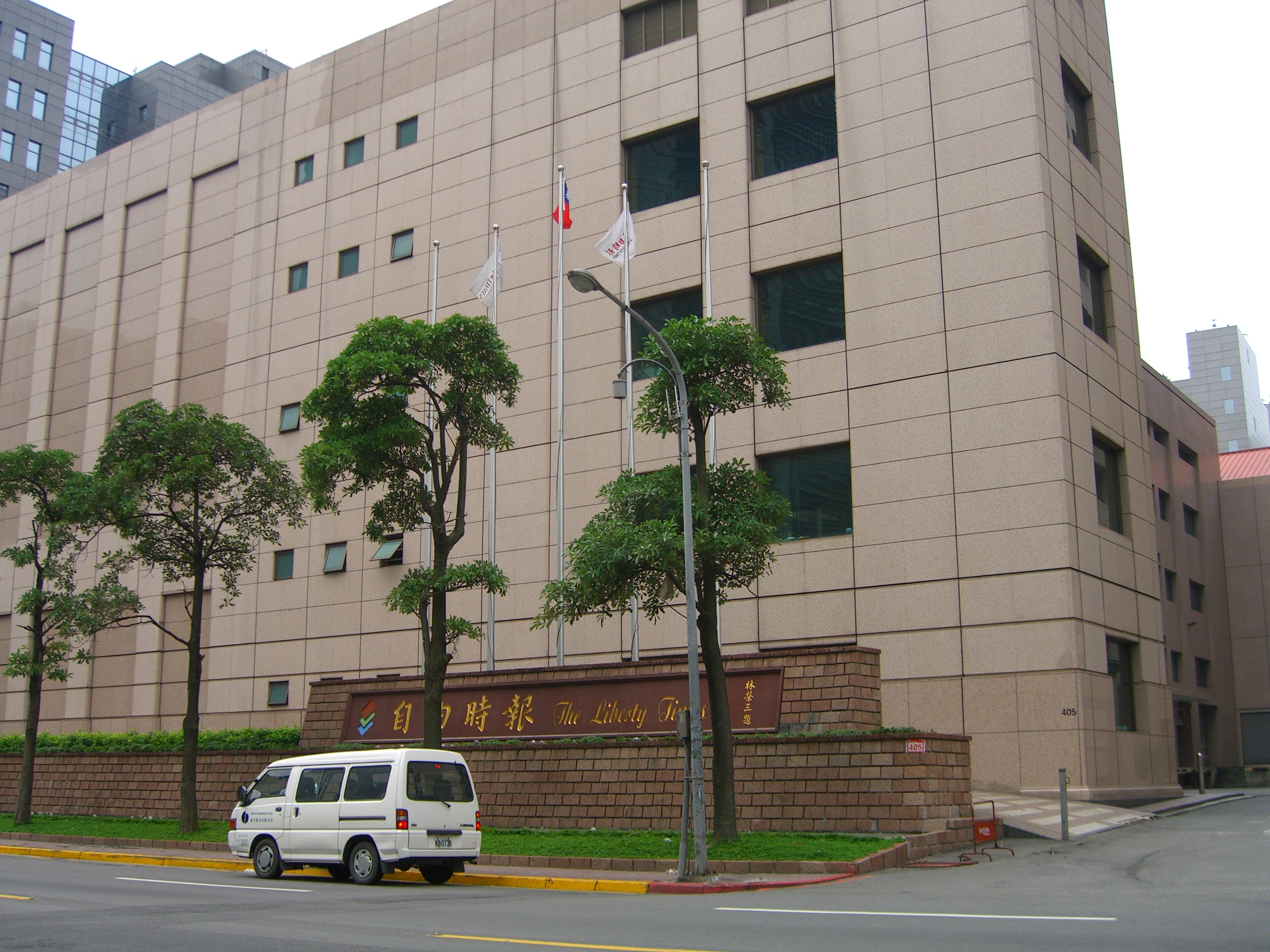
- The Liberty Times headquarters in Taipei
- Type: Daily newspaper
- Format: Broadsheet
- Publisher: Liberty Times Group
- Founded: April 17, 1980; 46 years ago
- Political alignment: Pan-Green
- Language: Chinese
- Headquarters: Taipei, Taiwan
- Circulation: 2,810,000
- Website: ltn.com.tw

Chinese name
- Traditional Chinese: 自由時報
- Simplified Chinese: 自由时报
Transcriptions
Standard Mandarin
- Hanyu Pinyin: Zìyóu Shíbào
Southern Min
- Hokkien POJ: Chū-iû-sî-pò

The Liberty Times is a national newspaper published in Taiwan. Founded by Lin Rong-San, it is published by the Liberty Times Group. The newspaper was first published on 17 April 1980, as Liberty Daily, before adopting its current name in 1987. In 1999, the owners launched a separate English language newspaper, the Taipei Times.

It is one of the four most influential newspapers in Taiwan, the other three being the Apple Daily, the China Times, and the United Daily News. While the United Daily News is regarded as taking an editorial line that supports a Pan-Blue political stance, the Liberty Times is considered to take a Pan-Green pro-independence political stance.

== History ==
=== Early history ===
In 1946, the Three Principles of the People Youth League established a newspaper in Taitung, called Taitung Daobao. Initially on the verge of closure in 1948, it was taken over by Chen Zhen-zong and renamed Taitung Xinbao, becoming the first newspaper in eastern Taiwan. However, due to insufficient funding, the publication ceased in October 1950. It resumed operations in July 1952 and was later privatised by Wu A-ming in early 1961, eventually relocating to Changhua and rebranding as the Ziqiang Ribao.

=== Foundation and early development ===
The Liberty Daily was founded in April 1980 by Lin Rong-San, following his acquisition of Ziqiang Ribao for 40 million NT dollars. Despite significant investment, the paper initially suffered monthly losses of around 20 million NT.

Wanting to establish itself in the market, Liberty Daily dramatically reduced the price of small ads from 35 NT to 5 NT, attracting advertisements and filling a gap left by larger newspapers due to limited space. The paper also capitalized on the rise of lotteries, publishing columns that predicted winning numbers, which not only boosted readership but also significantly increased revenue from small ads related to lotteries. This strategy helped the paper balance its finances, with circulation rising from 30,000 to 40,000 copies and monthly ad revenue exceeding a million NT.

Government measures later restricted the paper's lottery-related content, leading to a decline in circulation and advertising revenue. In 1986, Liberty Daily relocated to Taipei and underwent a major reform, shifting its focus towards promoting "Taiwan" over the "Republic of China" and prioritising local perspectives, with the slogan "Taiwan above all, priority to freedom."

=== Post-media control era ===
In 1988, Taiwan lifted media controls, and Liberty Daily was rebranded as Liberty Times. Immediately following the liberalisation, the United Daily News and the China Times faced a steep decline in sales after raising their prices. In contrast, Liberty Daily, which kept its price at NT$10, saw its readership surge from 14.2% to 21.7%. The paper adopted an aggressive distribution policy, including recruiting employees from the United Daily News and the China Times distribution networks by offering better pay.

The paper experienced rapid growth, with circulation increasing from 185,000 in 1988 to over a million by 1996, becoming Taiwan's most popular newspaper. On June 15, 1999, Lin launched the Taipei Times, an English-language daily, establishing the Liberty Times group. After 1996, Liberty Times remained the leading Taiwanese daily, but from 1999 onwards, its readership began to erode. Additionally, its advertising revenue remained smaller than that of its competitors: in 2001, it accounted for 18% of the market, compared to 25% for United Daily News and 24% for China Times.

In 2003, the launch of Apple Daily in Taiwan shook the existing newspaper landscape, quickly attracting a significant readership. However, Liberty Times retained its position as the leading newspaper, with a readership of 19.1%. By 2009, it had become the second most popular newspaper after Apple Daily, with a readership of 25%.

== Political positions ==
The Liberty Times has been notably partisan, at times opportunistically aligning with the prevailing political forces. In 2000, it supported the Kuomintang (KMT) presidential candidate Lien Chan, but by 2004, it shifted its support to the Democratic Progressive Party (DPP)'s candidate, Chen Shui-bian. The Liberty Times developed strong connections with the newly elected DPP government after 2000, effectively transitioning from backing the liberal faction of the KMT to supporting the DPP. Meanwhile, its chief competitors, United Daily News and China Times, faced growing commercial pressure to increase their coverage of issues important to the increasingly assertive pro-independence movement.

Since 2008, the newspaper has consistently supported the DPP and its agenda to promote the Taiwan identity. In a survey published in 2022, the newspaper was believed to support the Pan-Green Coalition and had a China-critical leaning. It has nearly become a mouthpiece for the Taiwanese independence faction within the DPP, criticizing even the moderate policies of President Tsai Ing-wen. In February 2026, the KMT sued the Liberty Times and its editor-in-chief after reporting on a planned meeting between Xi Jinping and Cheng Li-wun.

== Reputation ==
In 2025, a survey conducted by the Reuters Institute for the Study of Journalism found that 40% of respondents trusted the Liberty Times, while 29% expressed distrust. Overall, 30% of respondents expressed trust in news.

=== Awards and recognitions ===
Year	Awarded by	Category	Award type	Journalists	References
2010	The Society of Publishers in Asia (SOPA)	Excellence in Reporting on the Environment	Award for Excellence	Lju Li-rzen, Lim Kuo-hsian, Hsieh Wen-hua, and Wang Chang-min	
2010	Taipei Journalists Association's Social Bright Side Reporting Awards (SBSRA)	Printed Newspapers	Award	Huang Min-tang	

== See also ==
- Taipei Times
- Mass media in Taiwan
