= Ghost Nation: The Story of Taiwan and Its Struggle for Survival =

2025 book by Chris Horton

- Author: Chris Horton
- Publication date: July 17, 2025
- ISBN: 978-1-035-03402-4

Ghost Nation: The Story of Taiwan and Its Struggle for Survival is a 2025 nonfiction book about Taiwan by journalist Chris Horton. The book focuses on the history of Taiwanese democracy and the country's present day foreign relations, which are largely conducted at the unofficial level.

== Background ==
At the time of the book's publishing, Horton worked as a journalist reporting on Taiwan for The New York Times, The Guardian, and the Atlantic. Horton had described Taiwan's diplomatic status as a "geopolitical absurdity", given the country's evolved democracy and institutions but lack of recognition by the majority of United Nations member states.

== Reception ==
In July 2025, Gregor Stuart Hunter writing for Nikkei Asia wrote that Ghost Nation is an "attempt to unpick this Gordian knot of international relations", referring to the "intellectual doublethink" that is required to describe Taiwan.

In January 2026, Nathan Buchan in the Taipei Times wrote that Ghost Nation was "utterly crucial for understanding both Taiwan's domestic politics and global importance today."

Tom Miller characterized the book as being written "entirely with a pro-independence view" in The Spectator.

The Deccan Herald wrote that "The title Ghost Nation captures the central tension: Taiwan possesses all the attributes of nationhood — its own history, culture, politics and society — yet it is rendered spectral by international hesitation and Beijing's insistence on rewriting its past."

== See also ==
- Forbidden Nation
- Defending Taiwan: A Strategy to Prevent War with China
- Taiwan: A Contested Democracy Under Threat
