= Wu geng chang wang =

Taiwanese dish

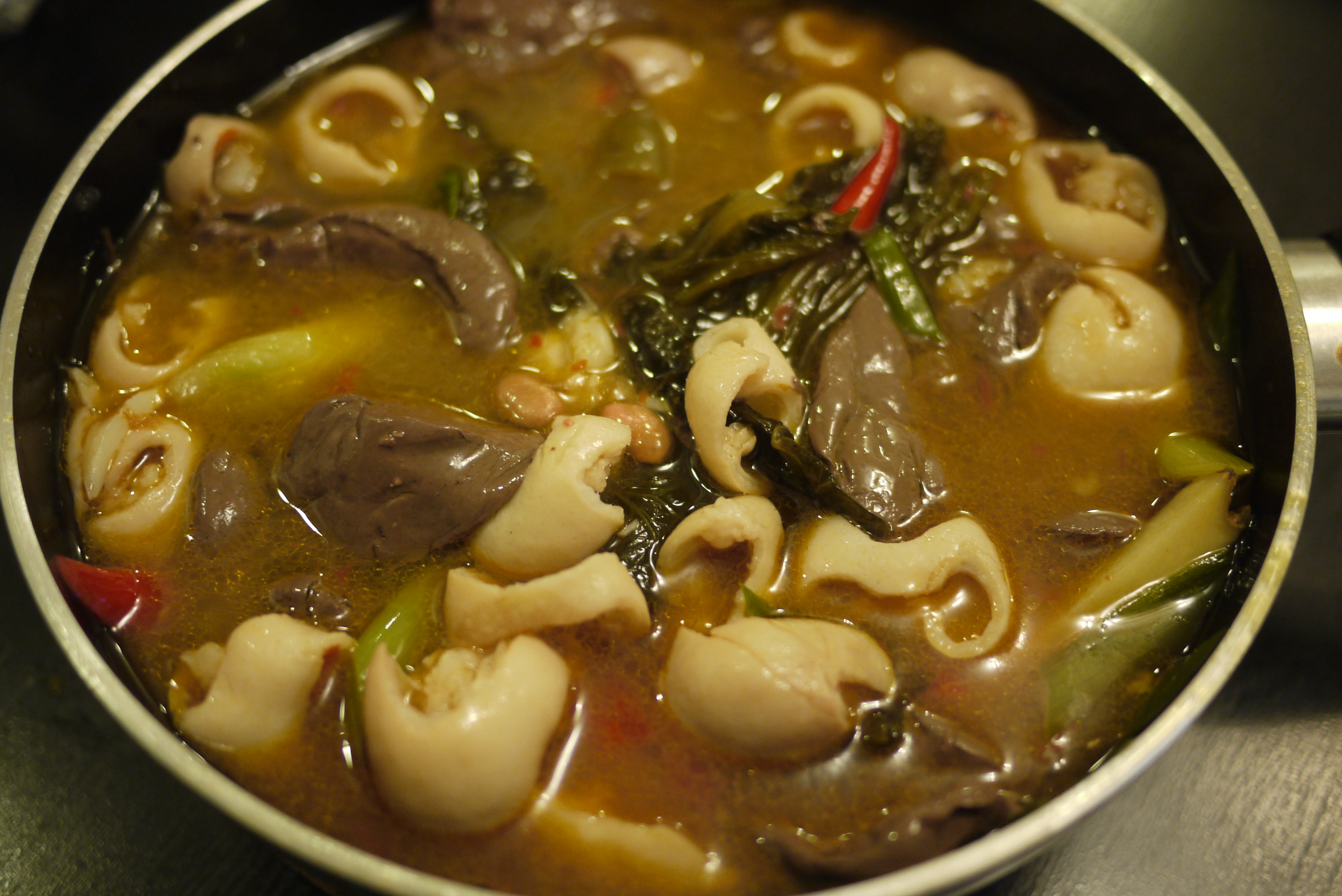
Wu geng chang wang

Wu geng chang wang (simplified Chinese: 五更肠旺; traditional Chinese: 五更腸旺; pinyin: wǔgēngchángwàng; lit. '3:00 to 5:00 A.M chitterling and blood') is a Taiwanese dish that is commonly found in Rechao or Sichuan style restaurants in Taiwan.

== Origin ==
Wǔ gēng cháng wàng is often found in Sichuan style restaurants in Taiwan or Chinese restaurants overseas. It is often mistaken as Sichuan cuisine, but it is unknown in Sichuan. It was actually a Sichuan style dish created in Taiwan, likely when a chef wanted to impress former president Chiang Ching-kuo by simmering pig intestines and duck blood, cooking it until five "gēng" (3:00 A.M. to 5:00 A.M), so the dish became known as "five gēng intestines and blood". Famed painter Chang Dai-chien disliked the name and renamed it "wǔ gēng cháng wàng".

It might have also been created by a housewife living in a military dependents' village who combined common ingredients in a hot pot.

== Etymology ==
There are various origins for the words "wǔ gēng" (五更). It might be that the dish needs to be cooked until five gēng. It might also be that the dish requires the gěng, or "stem", of five plant ingredients, garlic shoots/green onion, suan cai, chili pepper, garlic, and ginger. It is also likely that people used to use a small stove called wǔ gēng stove at night, and the dish might have been created in the same kind of stove.

"Cháng" (腸) means large intestines of pigs.

"Wàng" (旺) means duck blood, pig blood, or chicken blood, which are also called wàng zǐ (旺子) or xiě wàng (血旺) in Guizhou. Wǔ gēng cháng wàng was originally named wǔ gēng cháng xiě, or "five gēng intestines and blood", but painter Chang Dai-chien thought the name was unappetizing. Since blood is red and the color represents wàng, or "prosperity", in traditional Chinese culture, the name was changed to wǔ gēng cháng wàng.

Cháng wàng (腸旺) sounds similar to chāng wàng (昌旺), or "prosperous and flourishing", and cháng wàng (常旺), or "often prosperous". Wǔ gēng represents the approach of dawn, symbolizing a new day, so wǔ gēng cháng wàng represents prosperity everyday until dawn.

== See also ==
- Taiwanese cuisine
- Chitterlings
