= Sanbeiji =

Chinese and Taiwanese chicken dish

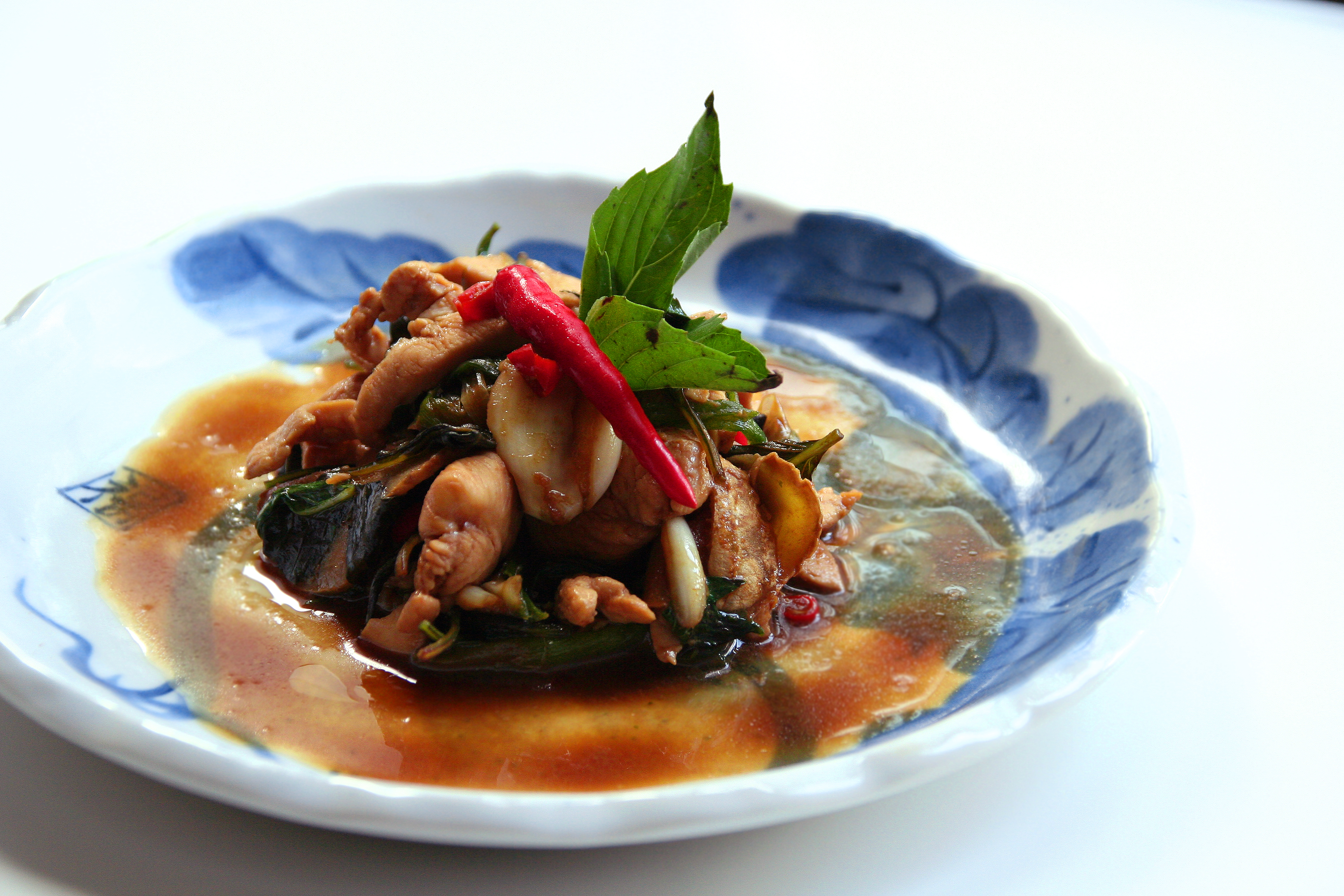
A plate of sanbeiji

Sanbeiji (simplified Chinese: 三杯鸡; traditional Chinese: 三杯雞; pinyin: sānbēijī; Wade–Giles: San^{1}-pei^{1} chi^{1}; Pe̍h-ōe-jī: sam-poe-ke; lit. 'three-cup chicken') is a popular chicken dish in Chinese cuisine and one of the most iconic dishes of Jiangxi cuisine. The dish originates from the Jiangxi province of southern China, and is a specialty of Ningdu where the population are Hakka. The dish has become especially popular in Taiwan, being introduced to the island by the Hakka people. It is also served as a postpartum confinement food by the Chinese community of Malaysia. The Jiangxi style has a complex flavor and is spicy, while the Taiwan variant has a more simplistic flavor and is non-spicy.

== Origins ==
There are several versions for the origins of sanbeiji. These stories often involve a cook who placed three cups of sauces into an earthenware pot and simmered it for a long time. One version is that of Wen Tianxiang, a national hero and Jiangxi native during the Song dynasty. Wen was captured by the invading Yuan armies of Kublai Khan and tortured for four years during his imprisonment. It was during this time that a sympathetic prison warden cooked the dish for him (using these limited resources) before Wen Tianxiang's execution.

== "Three cups" ==
The dish derives its name from the three cups of sauces supposedly used for the anecdotal dish. For every chicken, a cup each of soy sauce, rice wine (usually mijiu although it may be mixed with Shaoxing jiu), and sesame oil were included. Lin Shangquan, a famous chef in Taiwan, believes that the traditional recipe called for a cup each of soy sauce, sesame oil, and sugar, or rice wine, soy sauce, and sesame oil, with added ginger, garlic, and basil.

Modern recipes rarely call for a cup of either oil or sugar.

The chicken, together with the sauces, is cooked in an earthenware pot on high heat for ten minutes, then on low heat to allow the sauces to be absorbed by the meat. Sanbeiji is served with no sauce; the dish is cooked until all the sauce evaporates and is absorbed by the chicken. When it is served at the table, the chicken should be sizzling—even popping—on the cusp of burning. This gives the chicken a crisper texture (and richer flavor) unlike most other Chinese or Taiwanese stewed dishes. The dish is then eaten with either steamed rice or rice congee.

Other meats, such as pork or frog, can be substituted for chicken in this dish without detracting from the taste.

== Popularity ==
The dish is popular in Taiwan and in areas of Taiwanese immigration.

== See also ==
- Jiangxi cuisine
- List of chicken dishes
