= Lin Yu-lin =

Taiwanese businessman (1936–2018)

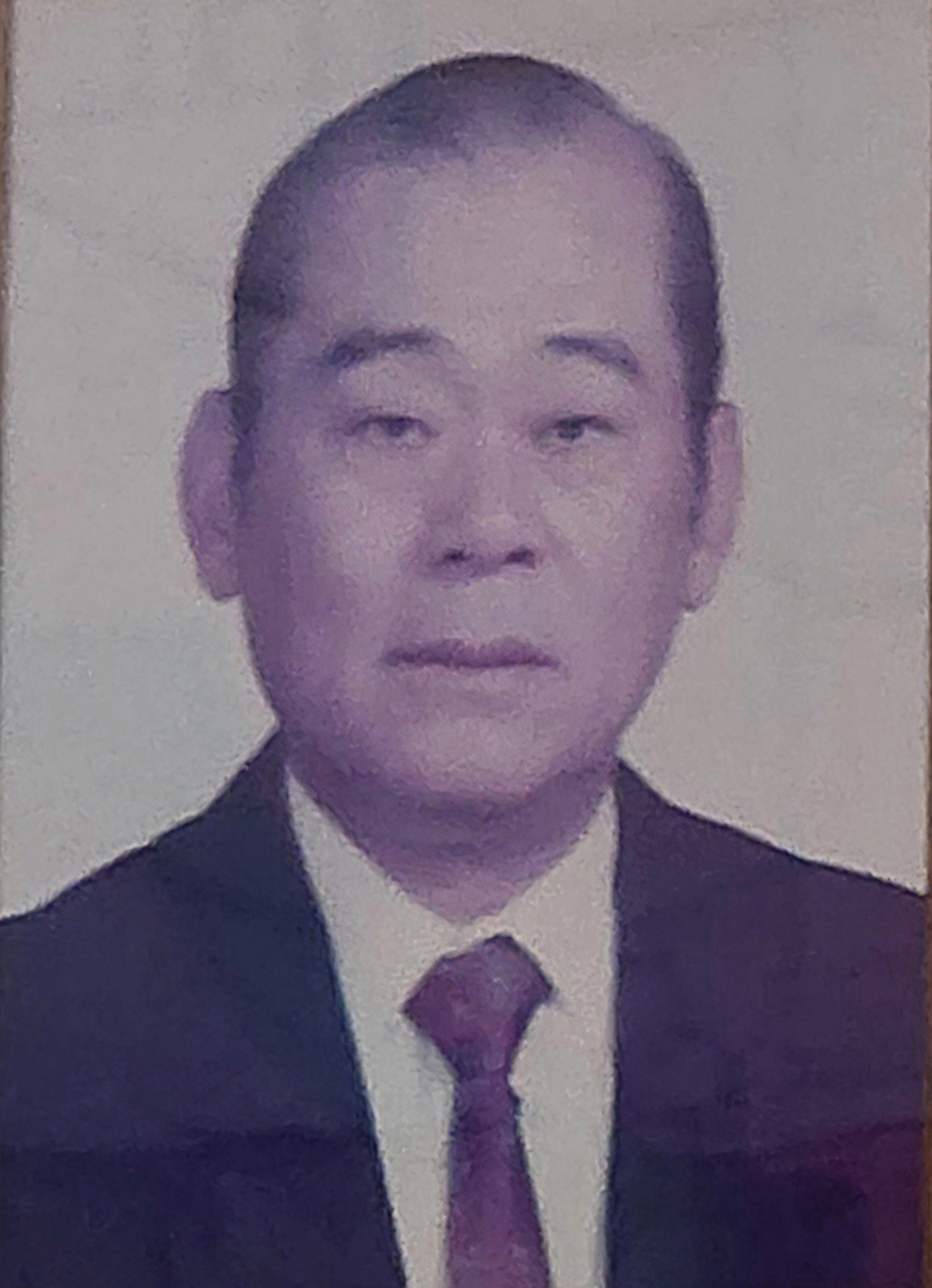
- Born: 6 October 1936; Shinshō, Taihoku Prefecture, Japanese Taiwan (now New Taipei City, Taiwan)
- Died: 9 June 2018 (aged 81)
- Occupation: real estate developer
- Children: 7
- Relatives: Lin Rong-San (brother)

Lin Yu-lin (Chinese: 林堉璘; pinyin: Lín Yùlín; 6 October 1936 – 9 June 2018) was a Taiwanese billionaire real estate developer, brother of fellow billionaire and politician Lin Rong-San.

== Biography ==
Lin Yu-lin was born in 1936. He was a real estate mogul, owner of the commercial property Hung Tai Center, and a major investor in the construction companies Hung Sheng Construction, Cooperative Construction and Hung Tai Asset Management. He was also a key shareholder in En Tie Commercial Bank. He owned the office and retail complexes Exchange Square I and II in Taipei.

According to Forbes, Lin had a net worth of $5.7 billion in January 2015.

He was married with seven children and lived in Taipei. He died on 9 June 2018 at the age of 81.
