= Lin Rong-San =

Taiwanese politician, publisher, real estate developer and businessman

Lin Rong-san
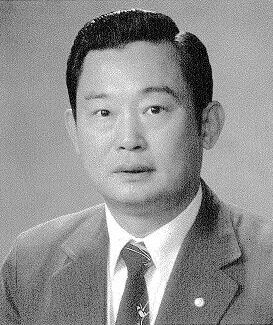
- Born: 27 May 1939; Roshū Village, Shinshō District, Taihoku, Taiwan, Empire of Japan
- Died: 28 November 2015 (aged 76); Taipei, Taiwan
- Occupations: Founder, Union Bank of Taiwan; publisher of Liberty Times (and its English counterpart)
- Political party: Kuomintang
- Children: 4

Lin Rong-san (Chinese: 林榮三; 27 May 1939 – 28 November 2015) was a Taiwanese politician, publisher, real estate developer and businessman. He was the founder of Union Bank of Taiwan, and the publisher of Liberty Times group that also includes its English-language version Taipei Times.

== Career ==
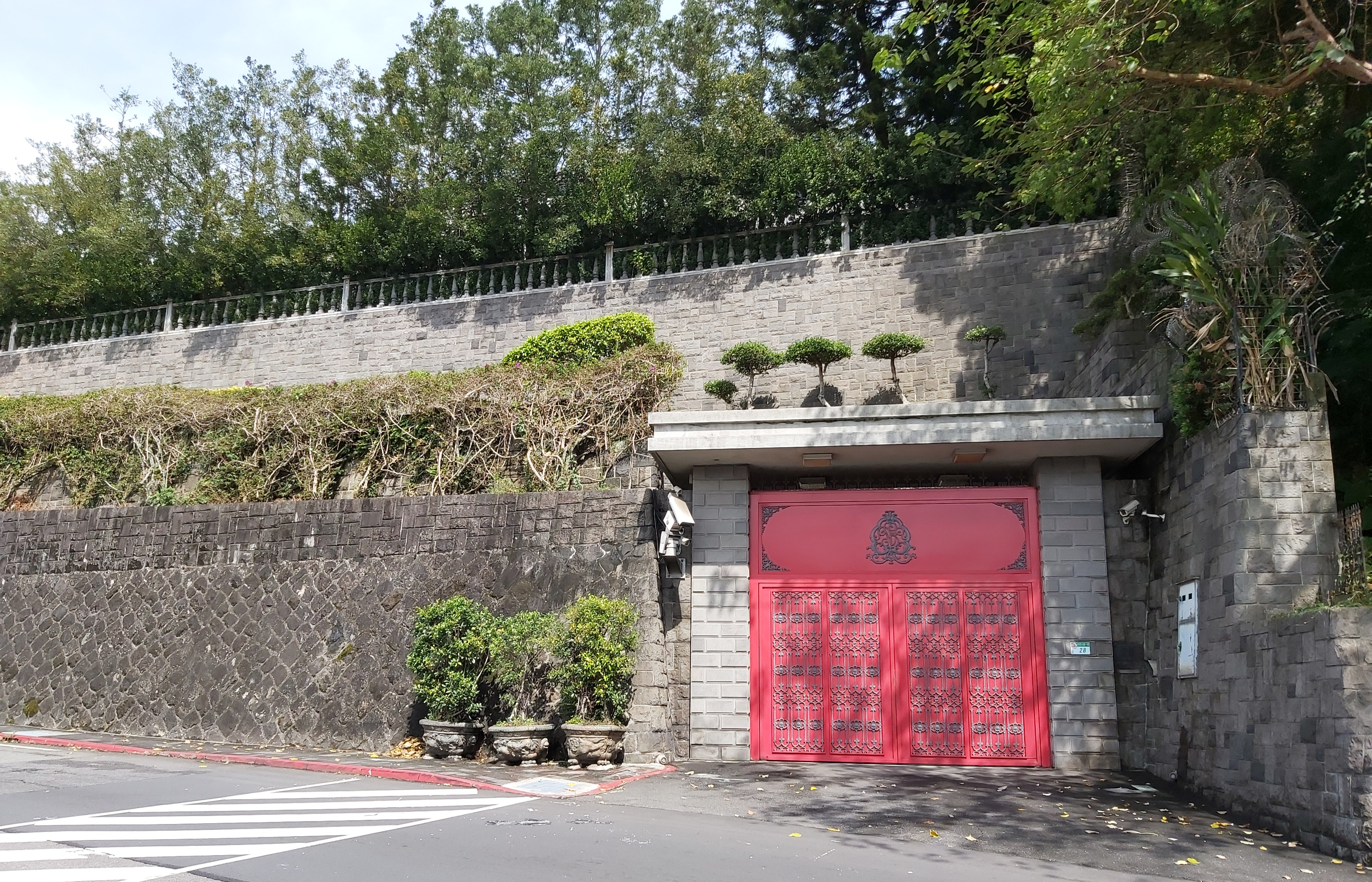
Former Residence of Lin Rong-San in Shilin District, Taipei.

He was a member of the Kuomintang from 1977 until his death. He won a controversial election against Tangwai candidate Kuo Yu-hsin to the Legislative Yuan in 1975. He was later accused of involving electoral fraud, which was published in "The Tiger Falls in Pingyang: The Election! Lawsuit! Kuo Yu-hsin (虎落平陽－選戰！官司！郭雨新)". He was named Vice President of the Control Yuan in 1992, but stepped down to focus on the Liberty Times.

In June 2008, Forbes magazine ranked him as the seventh richest of Taiwan, with a net worth of US$2.7 billion. Lin fell to eighth on the same list in 2010, then slid to tenth in 2011. In November 2015, his fortune was valued at US$3.9 billion. Lin was awarded the Order of Brilliant Star with Grand Cordon by Lee Teng-hui in 2000, followed by the Order of Propitious Clouds with Grand Cordon from Chen Shui-bian in 2008.

His older brother is the billionaire real estate developer Lin Yu-lin.

== Personal life ==
Lin died at home in Taipei on 28 November 2015, from cardiopulmonary failure caused by a tumor.
