= TaiwanPlus =

Taiwanese public broadcasting company

- Country: Taiwan
- Broadcast area: international

Programming
- Language: English
- Picture format: HDTV 1080i

Ownership
- Owner: Public Television Service
- Key people: Michael Yu (CEO)

History
- Launched: 30 August 2021; 4 years ago (online service); 3 October 2022; 3 years ago (linear TV channel)

Links
- Website: taiwanplus.com

Availability

Terrestrial
- DVB-T (Taiwan): channel 7

Streaming media
- TaiwanPlus Official Website: TaiwanPlus
- TaiwanPlus YouTube: YouTube

TaiwanPlus is a public media company based in Taipei. Launched on 30 August 2021, it offers live streaming and an international television channel, delivering a variety of content, including news, lifestyle features, technology, travel shows, entertainment programming, cultural insights, food content, and documentaries. The platform provides access to its streaming services through its website, mobile app, and 24-hour TV channel.

== History ==
The service was launched on 30 August 2021. It is overseen by the Ministry of Culture (MOC) and operated by the Central News Agency (CNA). The MOC first publicly expressed interest in an international streaming service in July 2020, but a proposal involving the Public Television Service (PTS) was met with backlash that led to the proposal's abandonment, over criticism that it would be a vehicle for propaganda and constitute government interference with the PTS. The decision to give the operation responsibility to the CNA was made in May 2021 and the news agency promised to run the news on TaiwanPlus independently from its other operations. Starting in June 2022, the service is under the management of PTS.

The government of Taiwan has financed the service with NT$775 million ($23 million) and the aim of the service is to tell Taiwan's stories to the world through an all-English-language medium.

In 2022, the documentary series Road to Legacy—about indie pop in Taiwan—was released on the service. The show has received three nominations at the 57th Golden Bell Awards. In August 2022, the National Communications Commission (NCC) announced that TaiwanPlus would be made available on local television for domestic audiences following the platform’s transfer to PTS. The official launch took place on 3 October 2022.

On 11 November 2022, TaiwanPlus's website was blocked in China and the app was removed from Apple China's App Store, and didn't provide further explanation on the blockage.

On 5 November 2024, a TaiwanPlus journalist reporting on the 2024 United States presidential election referred to Donald Trump as a "convicted felon". TaiwanPlus later took down the report in response to criticisms of the report. On the other hand, Shin Hung Lo (羅世宏), a Taiwanese media scholar, supported the report. He criticised TaiwanPlus for its self-censorship, which he said damaged its reputation.

In December 2024, during a meeting of the Legislative Yuan's Culture and Education Committee, several legislators from both the Kuomintang (KMT) and the Democratic Progressive Party (DPP) criticized TaiwanPlus for having only over 160,000 app downloads after four years since its establishment. They pointed out that this number is still far from the revised target of 220,000 downloads and proposed cutting NT20 million from TaiwanPlus′s allocated budget of NT800 million.

=== Timeline ===
- August 2021 TaiwanPlus is established.
- August 2022 Viewership reaches an all-timepeak following then-U.S. House Speaker Nancy Pelosi's visit to Taiwan.
- October 2022 TaiwanPlus launched its TV channel in Taiwan, accompanied by a 24/7 YouTube livestream of the channel's content.
- October 2022 Original series “Road to Legacy” wins Best Sound Design at the 57th Golden Bell Awards.
- November 2022 TaiwanPlus Live broadcast presents the special program “Decision 2022”covering the vote counting for nine-in-one elections.
- December 2022 TaiwanPlus channel has achieved a cable television penetration rate of over 90%.
- December 2022 TaiwanPlus social media platform has over 500,000 followers and subscribers.
- April 2023 An exclusive documentary on director Tsai Ming-liang, “The Pursuit of a Cinematic Dream”won the Bronze Award at the New York Film and TV Awards.
- August 2023 TaiwanPlus’s TV channel launches in the United States and Singapore.
- August 2023 Original program “The Jennie Show” wins a Silver Award for Best Asian Comedy Show at Content Asia awards.

== See also ==
- Clarissa Wei
