= Jerome F. Keating =

American writer and academic

Jerome F. Keating is an American writer and academic.

== Career ==
He worked on the Taipei and Kaohsiung Mass Rapid Transit projects as the technology transfer manager. Keating first taught in Taiwan at Chinese Culture University before moving to National Taipei University. He is an established author in Taiwan known for his dislike of both the Kuomintang (KMT) and Chinese Communist Party (CCP).

He regularly writes op-eds for the Taipei Times. He currently lives in Taipei, Taiwan.

== Books ==
- Island in the Stream
- Taiwan: the Struggles of a Democracy
- Taiwan the Search for Identity
- The Mapping of Taiwan
- The Paradigms that Guide Our Lives and Drive Our Souls
- Taiwan: The Struggle Gains Focus
