= Union Bank of Taiwan =

Bank of Taiwan

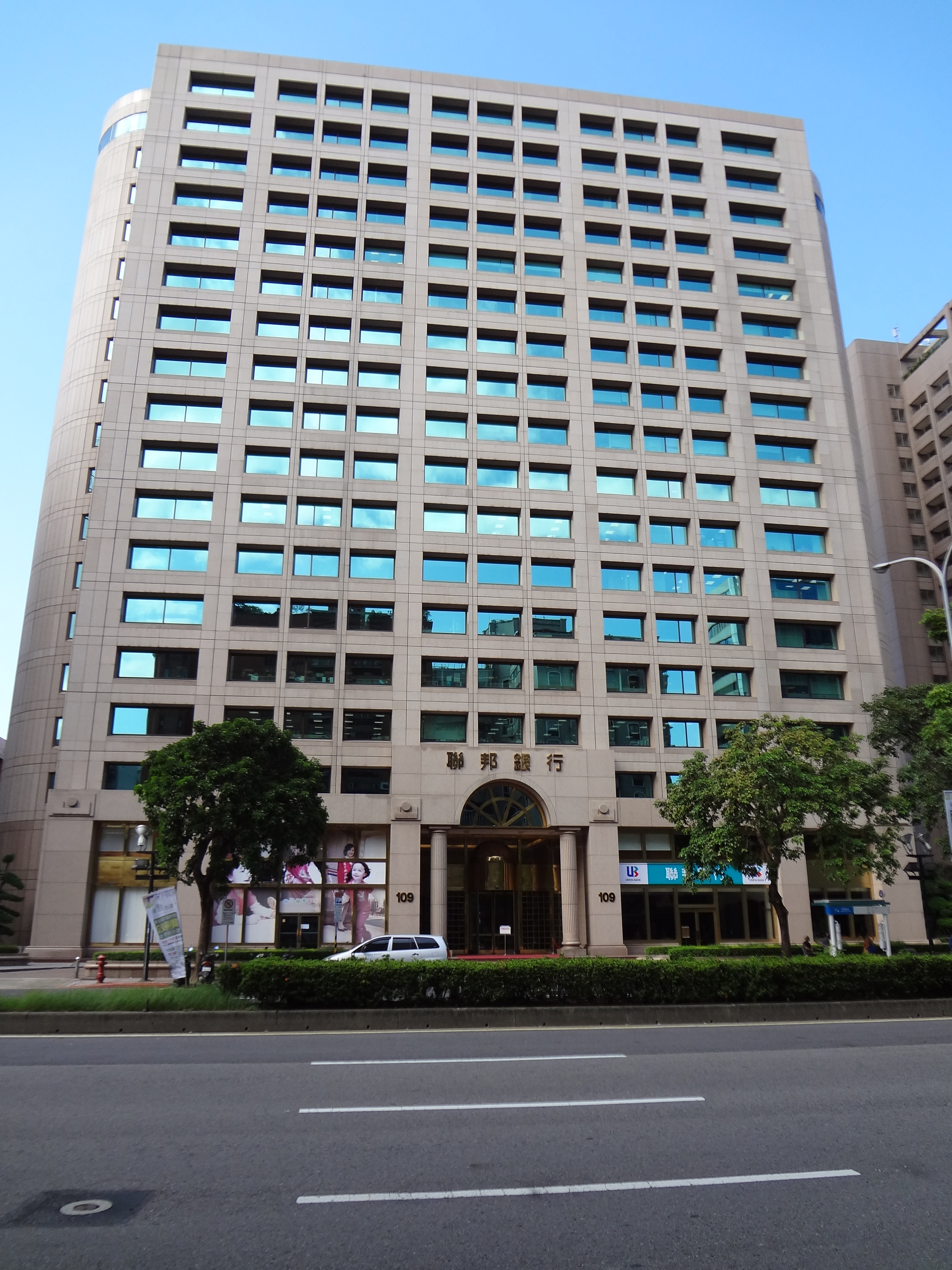
- Native name: 聯邦銀行
- Company type: Bank
- Industry: Financial services
- Founded: 21 January 1992
- Headquarters: Taiwan
- Website: ubot.com.tw

Union Bank of Taiwan (UBOT; Chinese: 聯邦銀行) is a bank in Taiwan. It is headquartered in Taipei and employs 3,628 people.

Forbes states that Union Bank of Taiwan is a "medium-size lender", and is controlled by its founder, the billionaire Lin Rong-San.

== History ==
The preparatory office for the bank was set up on 29 March 1989 and the bank commenced its business on 21 January 1992.
