= Chris Horton (journalist) =

American journalist and author

Chris Horton is an American journalist and author based in Taipei, Taiwan. Horton has extensively covered Taiwan in the context of its relationship with China and within international organizations, including the United Nations. He has also written on Taiwan's domestic politics and culture, including local political candidates and the country's film industry. He previously served as vice president of the Taiwan Foreign Correspondents' Club.

== Career ==
Horton served as China editor at Asia Times in 2003, and as editor of China Economic Review magazine in 2004. In 2005, he founded GoKunming, a local media company covering Kunming, China. In 2020, he joined Bloomberg News to cover Taiwanese markets.

== Publications ==
- Ghost Nation: The Story of Taiwan and Its Struggle for Survival (2025)
