= Clarissa Wei =

American journalist and writer

- Born: Los Angeles, California, U.S.
- Education: New York University (BA)
- Occupation: Journalist
- Known for: Food and politics writing

Chinese name
- Traditional Chinese: 魏貝珊
Transcriptions
Standard Mandarin
- Wade–Giles: Wei Pei-Shan
- Website: https://clarissawei.com/

Clarissa Wei is an American journalist and writer. Her focus is on Taiwan and in particular Taiwanese food and food culture. Her book Made in Taiwan: Recipes and Stories of the Island Nation was released in 2023 and was nominated for a James Beard Media Award. The book won the IACP Julia Child First Book Award.

== Personal life ==
Wei was born in Los Angeles, California, to Taiwanese American immigrant parents from Tainan, Taiwan. She graduated from New York University with a bachelor's degree in journalism and political science. As of 2023, she resided in New Taipei City.

== Career ==
As a food writer covering Los Angeles she caught the attention of Jonathan Gold, who recruited her as one of his food scouts. In 2018 she moved to Hong Kong and began writing for the South China Morning Post (SCMP). Her journalism initially focused on politics, but she shifted to food, often also touching on politics. Many of her stories in Hong Kong focused on aging restaurateurs or chefs who maintained important culinary traditions. During this time she traveled around China producing food and culture videos for SCMP.

In 2020 she left Hong Kong for Taiwan together with her husband, on 30 June, when the Hong Kong National Security Law took effect. She is one of the main authors writing about Taiwanese cuisine in English.

In February 2022, Wei made a Singaporean chicken curry recipe in a New York Times social media video, which was later removed following backlash regarding its authenticity.

She was the co-host of the cooking show Kitchen Remix on TaiwanPlus.

In 2025, Wei launched HEYDOH, an artisinal soy sauce company.

Her second book, Sitting the Month: Postpartum Recipes for Rest and Recovery, was published in September 2026.

=== Books ===
==== Made in Taiwan ====
Made in Taiwan: Recipes and Stories of the Island Nation was released in 2023. Made in Taiwan is an exploration of Taiwan's food culture. In it she emphasizes using Taiwanese ingredients and not substitutes more widely available internationally. The book has proved controversial due to Wei's focus on Taiwanese identity and politics as embodied in food.

Wei collaborated with recipe developer Ivy Chen on Made in Taiwan. James Lin, a historian, was hired to make sure that the historical aspects of the book were accurate. Xin Yun worked as Clarissa Wei's research assistant. Yen Wei was the food stylist and Ryan Chen handled photography.

==== Sitting the Month ====
Sitting the Month: Postpartum Recipes for Rest and Recovery was published in September 2026. It provides modern recipes for traditional Chinese herbal foods given to new mothers recovering from childbirth. The topic was inspired by Wei's own postpartum experience with her first child.

Wei collaborated with herbalist Stella Wang on the book.

=== Podcast ===
Her show, Climate Cuisine, is part of the Whetstone Radio Collective. It was launched in 2021 and examines how different national cuisines and agricultural practices have developed in similar climactic zones across the planet.
