= Opinion polling on Taiwanese identity =

This page lists public opinion polls conducted in relation to the issue of Taiwanese identity.

== Three-way polls ==
=== National Chengchi University ===
Trends of Taiwanese self-identity since 1992
View chart definition.

Date(s)	Sample size					Lead
Date(s)	Sample size	Taiwanese (臺灣人)	Chinese (中國人)	Both	No response / Do not know	Lead
December 2025	14985	62.0%	2.5%	31.7%	3.8%	30.3%
June 2025	5996	62.9%	2.3%	30.5%	4.3%	32.4%
December 2024	16442	63.4%	2.4%	31.0%	3.2%	32.4%
December 2023	14933	61.7%	2.4%	32.0%	3.9%	29.7%
December 2022	12173	63.3%	2.5%	30.6%	3.6%	32.7%
December 2021	12026	62.3%	2.8%	31.7%	3.2%	30.6%
December 2020	11490	64.3%	2.6%	29.9%	3.2%	34.4%
December 2019	16276	58.5%	3.3%	34.7%	3.5%	23.8%
December 2018	9490	54.5%	3.6%	38.2%	3.7%	16.3%
December 2017	13455	55.5%	3.7%	37.0%	3.7%	18.5%
December 2016	11490	59.5%	3.3%	33.3%	4.0%	26.2%
December 2015	22509	59.5%	3.3%	33.3%	4.0%	26.2%
December 2014	20009	60.6%	3.5%	32.5%	3.5%	28.1%
December 2013	13359	57.1%	3.8%	35.8%	3.3%	21.3%
December 2012	18011	54.3%	3.6%	38.5%	3.6%	15.8%
December 2011	23779	52.2%	3.9%	40.3%	3.7%	11.9%
December 2010	13163	52.7%	3.7%	39.8%	3.8%	12.9%
December 2009	20244	51.6%	4.2%	39.8%	4.4%	11.8%
December 2008	16280	48.4%	4.0%	43.1%	4.5%	5.2%
December 2007	13910	43.7%	5.4%	44.7%	6.2%	1.0%
December 2006	13193	44.2%	6.3%	44.9%	4.6%	0.7%
December 2005	7939	45.0%	7.2%	43.4%	4.4%	1.6%
December 2004	34854	41.1%	6.2%	47.7%	5.0%	6.6%
December 2003	14247	42.5%	8.3%	43.3%	5.9%	0.8%
December 2002	10003	41.2%	9.2%	43.7%	5.8%	2.5%
December 2001	10679	41.6%	10.6%	43.1%	4.7%	1.5%
December 2000	11062	36.9%	12.5%	44.1%	6.5%	7.2%
December 1999	9273	39.6%	16.3%	42.5%	5.8%	2.9%
December 1998	14063	36.2%	16.3%	39.6%	7.8%	3.4%
December 1997	3910	34.0%	19.2%	41.4%	5.3%	7.4%
December 1996	10666	24.1%	17.6%	49.3%	9.0%	25.2%
December 1995	21402	25.0%	20.7%	47.0%	7.3%	22.0%
December 1994	1209	20.2%	26.2%	44.6%	8.9%	18.4%
December 1992	4120	17.6%	25.5%	46.4%	10.5%	7.9%

=== Other polls ===
Date(s)	Pollster/client	Sample size					Lead
Date(s)	Pollster/client	Sample size	Taiwanese (臺灣人)	Chinese (中國人)	Both	No response / Do not know	Lead
March 14, 2023	Taiwan Public Opinion Foundation	1073	78.0%	7.7%	9.1%	5.2%	68.9%
April 19, 2022	Taiwan Public Opinion Foundation	1071	80.1%	5.3%	10.2%	4.4%	69.9%
July 21, 2021	Taiwan Public Opinion Foundation	1072	76.8%	7.5%	11.3%	4.4%	65.5%
February 25, 2020	Taiwan Public Opinion Foundation	1097	83.2%	5.3%	6.7%	4.8%	76.5%
November 24, 2019	CommonWealth Magazine	1073	61.9%	6.5%	28.3%	3.3%	33.6%
December 15, 2009	CommonWealth Magazine	--	62%	8%	22%	8%	40.2%
March 11, 2009	TVBS	1113	49%	3%	44%	4%	5%
June 9, 2008	TVBS	1015	45%	4%	45%	6%	0%

== Two-way polls ==
Date(s)	Polling organisation/client	Sample size				Lead
Date(s)	Polling organisation/client	Sample size	Taiwanese	Chinese	No response / Do not know	Lead
February 5, 2015	Taiwan Braintrust	1079	89.5%	6.0%	5.5%	83.5%
June 9, 2008	TVBS	1015	68%	18%	14%	50%
