= Jiangxi cuisine =

Culinary traditions of Jiangxi province, China

- Map of Jiangxi Province
- Chinese: 江西菜
- Traditional Chinese: 贛菜
- Simplified Chinese: 赣菜
Transcriptions
Standard Mandarin
- Hanyu Pinyin: [gàncài]

Jiangxi cuisine (Chinese: 江西菜; pinyin: Jiāngxī cài), also known as Gan cuisine (赣菜; 贛菜; gàncài), is a style of Chinese cuisine derived from the native cooking styles of Jiangxi province in southern China. According to the East China Travel Guide published in 1983, Jiangxi cuisine has its unique taste which can be described in four Chinese idioms: 原汁原味 (aim to bring out the own flavor of the cooking material)，油厚不腻 (dishes contained a significant amount of oil but the taste are not greasy)，口味浓厚 (dishes have really thick taste)，咸鲜兼辣 (always come with spicy solid, salty flavor). Jiangxi cuisine is widely popular within the ordinary family because most of the notable dishes from Jiangxi cuisine are the extension of homely dishes with solid local flavor.

== History ==
In ancient times, the Jiangxi Province of China was dominated by the ancestor of China’s Miao ethnic group. With the territorial disputes and subsequent chaos followed, residents from various regions migrated to the area that currently belongs to Jiangxi Province, searching for new homes. Besides the ordinary people, the migrants included many officials from the regions being defeated. These officials were accompanied by not only their family but also their chefs. Through migration, different cuisines and culinary customs were brought by new immigrants combined; eventually, different cuisines get improved and formed into new cuisine --- Jiangxi cuisine. And this is one of the reason Jiangxi cuisine are widely considered as the combination of other cuisines.

== Major genres of Jiangxi cuisine ==
The taste of the dishes might have minor variations among different cities in Jiangxi Province in which Jiangxi cuisine has overall four major genres based on its region names: Nanchang, Ganzhou, Jiujiang, Gandong. And each Genre of Jiangxi Cuisine has its unique cooking style and famous dishes.

- Nanchang Genres are mainly cooking food in the method of simmer and stir-fry. It has famous dishes of 'fried bacon with artemisia quinoa' (Chinese: '藜蒿炒腊肉'), "soup cooked with pottery jar' (Chinese:'瓦罐煨'), and spicy stir-fry Jiangxi rice-noodle ('辣江西炒米粉").

Map of Nanchang in Jiangxi Province

- Ganzhou Genres are mainly cooked food in steamed meat with rice flour and low heat fry. It has famous dishes of 'Steamed pork with rice flour' (Chinese: '粉蒸肉 ') and 'Gannan fried fish' (Chinese: '赣南小炒鱼').
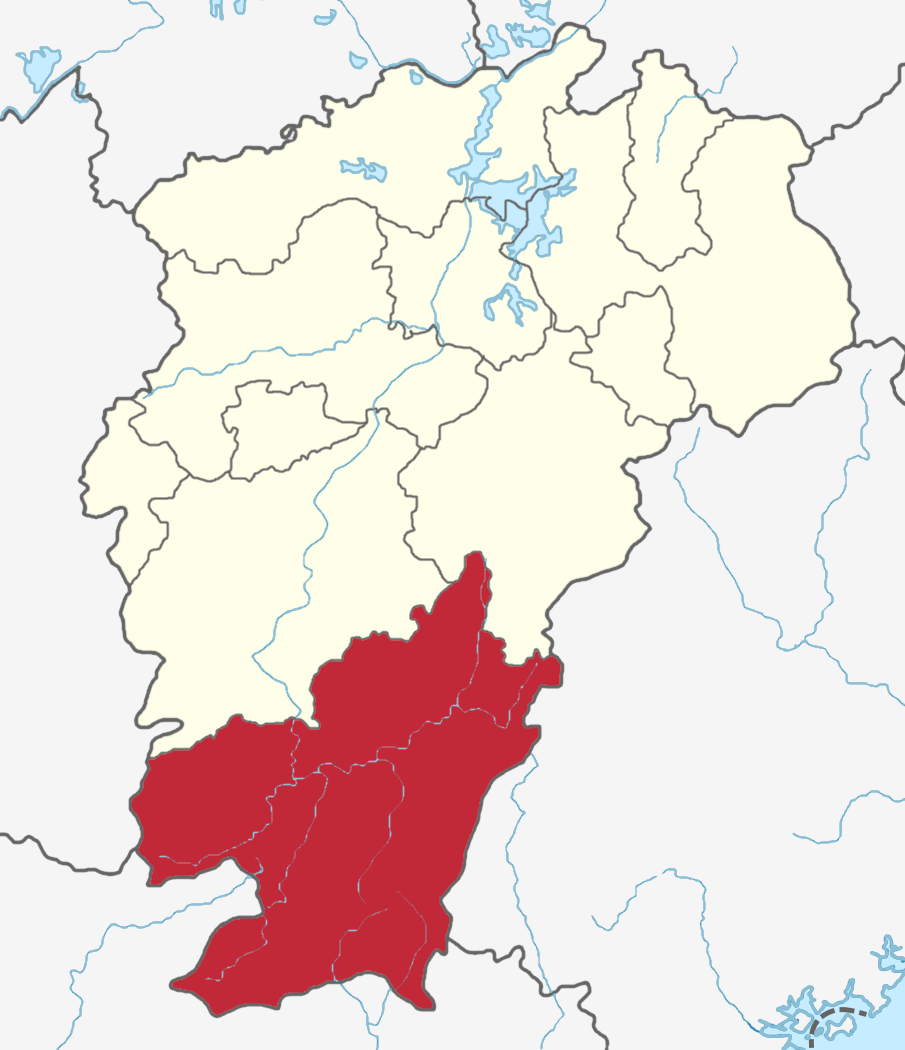
  Map of Ganzhou in Jiangxi Province
- Jiujiang Genres are mainly with the cooking style of stew and heavily used fish. It has famous dishes of 'Poyang Lake fat fish head with red pepper' (Chinese: '鄱湖胖鱼头').
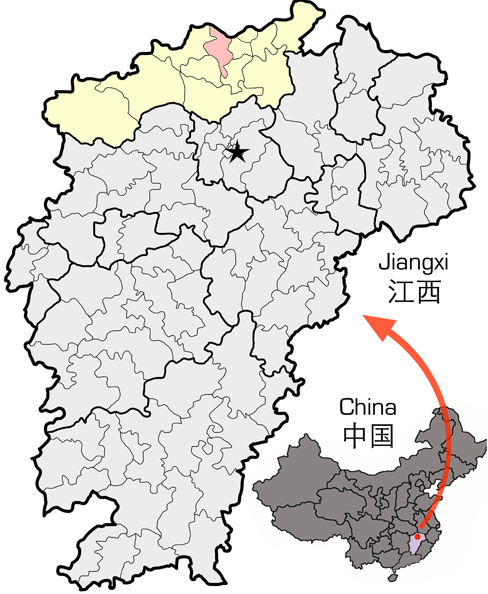
  Map of Jiujiang in Jiangxi Province
- Gandong Genres have usually smoked the meat or dried the food in the sun before cooking. It has famous dishes of 'Pingxiang smoked meat' (Chinese: '萍乡烟熏肉'), and 'Jinggang stir-fry smoked bamboo' (Chinese: '井岗烟笋').

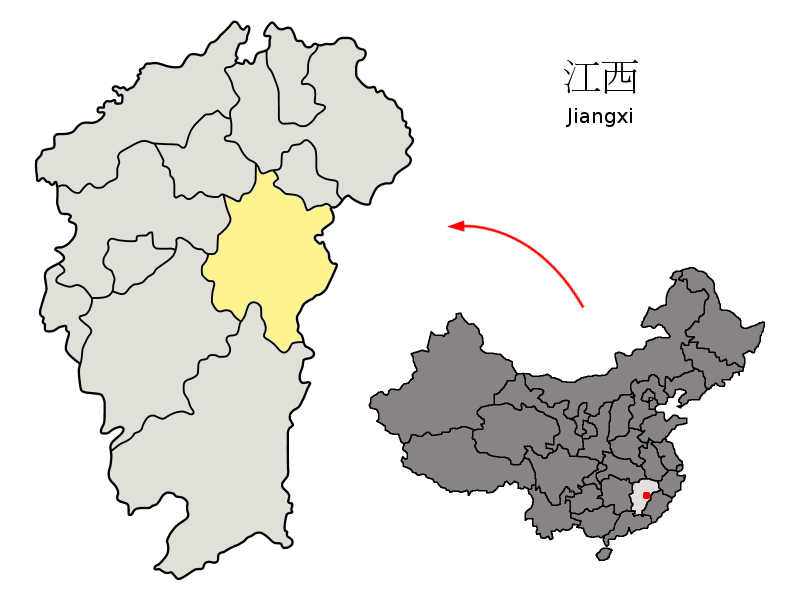
Map of Gandong in Jiangxi Province

== Characteristics ==
- Spiciness: Like the cuisines of its neighbour provinces, Jiangxi cuisine favours overtly spicy tastes. In many regions in Jiangxi, chili peppers are directly used as vegetables instead of ingredients to enhance flavour, as in most other Chinese regional cuisines.
- Absence of cold or raw dishes: Cold or raw dishes are rarely served in Jiangxi cuisine as compared to other Chinese cuisines.
- Fish banquets: Jiangxi cuisine is famous for its freshwater fish banquets in contrast with Northeastern Chinese cuisine, which is known for its anadromous fish banquets. This is due to Jiangxi's geographical location, as there are many freshwater zones in the province.
- Fermented black beans and beancurd: There is emphasis on the utilisation of douchi (fermented black beans) and tofu (beancurd) in comparison with other Chinese cuisines. Fried tofu is usually served during Chinese New Year celebrations.
- Tea oil: Jiangxi cuisine uses tea oil as its primary cooking oil. As tea oil can cause stomach problems when consumed uncooked, any dishes that is cooked in tea oil is not served raw, which is the reason for the absence of cold or raw dishes in Jiangxi cuisine. However, Jiangxi cuisine is unique in that tea oil is used almost exclusively as the only cooking oil, with one minor exception being rapeseed oil. Other Chinese cuisines, on the other hand, also use tea oil but supplement it with a variety of other cooking oils.

== Difference of Jiangxi Cuisine between Hunan and Sichuan Cuisine ==
Jiangxi cuisine, Hunan cuisine, and Sichuan cuisine all have spicy features in the majority of the notable dishes in each cuisine. However, each cuisine has a different cooking style and uses different materials used to increase the spiciness. Jiangxi cuisine focus on keeping the ‘original flavor’ of the food while using the spicy to enhance the level of the taste upon food original flavor. In addition, some dishes within the Jiangxi cuisine will use certain meat soups to enhance the taste of the plates. Jiangxi cuisine favors overtly spicy flavors; in many regions of the province, chili peppers are directly used as vegetable instead of as a seasoning, as in most other Chinese regional cuisines.

== Notable dishes ==
English	Image	Simplified Chinese	Pinyin	Note
Ningdu Spicy Sanbeiji		宁都三杯鸡	Níngdōusānbēijī	Also, have Taiwan-style Sanbeiji, which is not spicy and will add sugar when cooking. The cooking style of spicy Sanbeji in Jiangxi Cuisine is stir-fry, while Taiwan Sanbeiji is stew.
Steamed pork with rice flour		粉蒸肉	Fěnzhēngròu	In Jiangxi cuisine, people also steamed other meats with rice flour such as beef, chicken, fish, and so on.
Soup cooked with pottery jar（right） Nanchang stir-fry rice-noodle(left)		瓦罐煨(左） 南昌炒米粉（右）	Wǎ guàn wēi (zuǒ) Nánchāng chǎo mǐfěn (yòu)	This is the combination where people, especially Nanchang, Jiangxi, usually eat.
Poyang Lake fat fish head with red pepper		鄱湖胖鱼头	Pó hú pàng yú tóu	The use of the fish head is different from the fish head people used in Sichuan cuisine.

Department of Commerce of Jiangxi Province held the selection/competition of "Top Ten Jiangxi Cuisine Dishes" and "Top Ten Jiangxi Cuisine Dishes Snacks" in 2021 aim to promote the development of Jiangxi cuisine while spread Jiangxi cuisine into national level. According to the result of the competition, the "Top Ten Jiangxi Cuisine dishes" are Ningdu Sanbei chicken, lotus blood duck, four-star full moon, Yugan fried meat with dried chili, Jinggang smoked bamboo, fish head with white sauce, boiled mandarin fish with rice noodle, steam turtle with rice noodle, fried bacon with artemisia quatrica, Taihe black chicken soup(Chinese(listed in the same order): 宁都三杯鸡、莲花血鸭、四星望月、余干辣椒炒肉、井冈烟笋、白浇雄鱼头、鳜鱼煮粉、甲鱼粉皮、藜蒿炒腊肉、滋补泰和乌鸡). The "Top Ten Jiangxi Cuisine snacks" are soup cooked with pottery jar, Nanchang stir-fry rice-noodle, Ruijin beef soup, Yiyang rice cake, Jiujiang radish cake, Jinggang fry rice cake, Ruizhou shaomai, alkali water cake, Li Chuan taro paste, Anyuan three fresh rice noodle((Chinese(listed in the same order):瓦罐煨汤、南昌米粉、瑞金牛肉汤、弋阳年糕、九江萝卜饼、井冈糍粑、瑞州烧麦、碱水粑、黎川芋糍、安远三鲜粉).

According to the record under the book called 赣菜, published in 1993, there are over 209 dishes in Jiangxi cuisine at that time of date. Jiangxi cuisine is still made to this day to keep the original taste of the food alive through these culinary traditions. The majority of the ingredients used in Jiangxi cuisine are all locally sourced. Most of people in Jiangxi Province utilize local foods since they believed that fresh ingredients are the secret to a delicious dish. Therefore, the rich local made products in Jiangxi Province have established the solid foundation for the development of Jiangxi cuisine.
