= Defending Taiwan: A Strategy to Prevent War with China =

2025 book by Chris Horton

- Cover of the 2026 Oxford University Press edition
- Author: Eyck Freymann
- Publication date: April 15, 2026
- ISBN: 978-0-197-82384-2

Defending Taiwan: A Strategy to Prevent War with China is a 2026 nonfiction book about Taiwan by American political scientist Eyck Freymann. The book focuses on discussing strategies to deter armed conflict around the Taiwan Strait from a US perspective.

== Reception ==
In April 2026, Martin Petersen writing for The Cipher Brief wrote that "Freymann examines this critical element in a depth and with a sophistication I have not seen elsewhere."

In May 2026, Kate B. Odell writing for The Wall Street Journal wrote that Defending Taiwan is a "primer explaining how America and Taiwan are knit together by economics, geopolitics and a shared culture of political freedom."

In August 2026, Peter A. Dutton writing for Lawfare wrote that Defending Taiwan is "a valuable contribution to the national discussion about how to deal with what could be the 21st century’s single most dangerous crisis."

== See also ==
- Ghost Nation: The Story of Taiwan and Its Struggle for Survival
