= The World of Chinese =

English magazine on Chinese language

- Industry: Publishing
- Founded: 2006
- Headquarters: Beijing, China
- Products: magazines, books
- Website: http://www.theworldofchinese.com

The World of Chinese is a bi-monthly English magazine and web portal dedicated to Chinese language and culture.

Each issue focuses on one specific aspect of Chinese culture and explores it in depth. Previous issues have used broad themes such as Adventure, Social Media and Youth. Along with culture, the magazine also looks at travel within China, and Chinese cuisine.

The magazine was relaunched into its current format at the beginning of 2011. Whereas previous incarnations had included content such as business and economics, and had made much greater use of the Chinese language, this latest version leans more on contemporary issues in Chinese society. The aesthetic of the magazine was also completely overhauled, giving it a more unconventional appearance. The magazine is owned by The Commercial Press, and is targeted at expatriates living in China, as well as students studying the language.
