= Taipei Times =

Taiwanese English-language newspaper

Taipei Times 台北時報
- Type: Daily newspaper
- Format: Broadsheet
- Owner: The Liberty Times Group
- Founder: Lin Rong-San
- Publisher: The Liberty Times Group
- Founded: 15 June 1999 (26 years ago)
- Political alignment: Pan-Green
- Language: English
- Headquarters: Taipei, Taiwan
- ISSN: 1563-9525
- Website: www.taipeitimes.com

Taipei Times
- Traditional Chinese: 台北時報
- Simplified Chinese: 台北时报
Transcriptions
Standard Mandarin
- Hanyu Pinyin: Táiběi Shíbào
- Wade–Giles: T'ai²-pei³ Shih²-pao⁴
- Tongyong Pinyin: Táiběi Shíhbào
Southern Min
- Hokkien POJ: Tâi-pak sî-pò

The Taipei Times is an English-language print newspaper in Taiwan published by the Liberty Times Group. It was founded as Taiwan's third English-language newspaper on 15 June 1999, and as of 2018 it was the last remaining English-language paper there to still have a print edition.

== History ==
Published by the Liberty Times Group, the Taipei Times launched its first edition on 15 June 1999. It was the third English-language newspaper founded in Taiwan. President Lee Teng-hui attended its launch ceremony. The other two English-language media before the Taipei Times were Taiwan News and The China Post. It is a participant in Project Syndicate.

In a column celebrating the paper's fifth anniversary, then-Taipei Times associate editor Laurence Eyton wrote that much of the initial planning of the paper was concluded over pints of Carlsberg in a pub with Anthony Lawrence, the paper's first managing editor. In 2002, the daily circulation stood at 280,000 copies.

By 2017, the Taipei Times had become the last daily print newspaper in Taiwan, after competitors Taiwan News and China Post switched to digital-only formats.

The Taipei Times has been involved in several controversies over the years, including an argument with a member of the United States House of Representatives, a push for nuclear weapons under President Chen Shui-bian, and misleading readers about the origin of a letter to The Wall Street Journal.

== Editorial positions ==
Its editorial position leans toward Taiwan independence, and supports the development of Taiwan's own nuclear arsenal.

=== Opinion writers ===
- Jerome F. Keating

== See also ==
- Liberty Times
- Media of Taiwan
