= Lanzhou beef noodles =

Beef noodle soup from Lanzhou, China

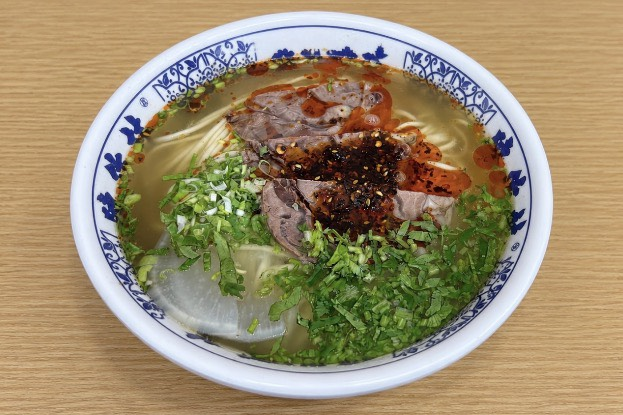
- A bowl of Lanzhou beef noodles
- Type: Noodle soup
- Place of origin: China
- Region or state: Lanzhou
- Main ingredients: Chinese noodles, beef, beef broth, vegetables

Lanzhou beef noodles
- Simplified Chinese: 兰州牛肉面
- Traditional Chinese: 蘭州牛肉麵
Transcriptions
Standard Mandarin
- Hanyu Pinyin: lanzhou niúròu miàn
other Mandarin
- Xiao'erjing: ﻧِﯿَﻮْ ژِﻮْ ﻣِﯿًﺎ
- Dungan: Нюроў мян
Hakka
- Romanization: ngiu nguk mien
Yue: Cantonese
- Jyutping: ngau4 juk6 min6
Southern Min
- Hokkien POJ: gû-bah mī

Lanzhou beef noodles is a type of beef noodle soup from Lanzhou, China. This dish has an extensive history and is intimately associated with Hui Muslim cuisine. The dish has since become widespread throughout China, with 50,000 noodle shops in the country serving the dish as of 2015.

== History ==
Lanzhou beef noodles are named after the city of Lanzhou, in Gansu province, which stretches to the Yellow River and was a stop on the ancient Silk Road. During the Tang dynasty, the Muslim Hui people developed a variation of beef noodle soup noodle that is compatible with the Muslim diet, with easy-to-prepare ingredients. Historians often attribute the creation of the dish in its modern form to Ma Baozi (马宝子), a Hui Muslim from Lanzhou who began selling the dish in 1915.

The "Lanzhou Lamian" commonly found outside Lanzhou is not the same dish as Lanzhou beef noodles; rather, it is a Halal-style version of Lamian from Hualong, Qinghai, marketed under the Lanzhou name.

An old saying states that Lanzhou has three treasures: "Auspicious gourds, beef noodles, and sheepskin rafts".

During the 1990s the dish gained popularity nationwide as a fresh, very affordable and nutritious fast food.

In 2001, Lanzhou beef noodles were designated as one of China's three main fastfood varieties (alongside Quanjude Peking duck and Goubuli baozi). In 2010, the dish was recognized with the Chinese equivalent of protected designation of origin. The skill of making Lanzhou beef noodles was included into China's national intangible cultural heritage list in 2021.

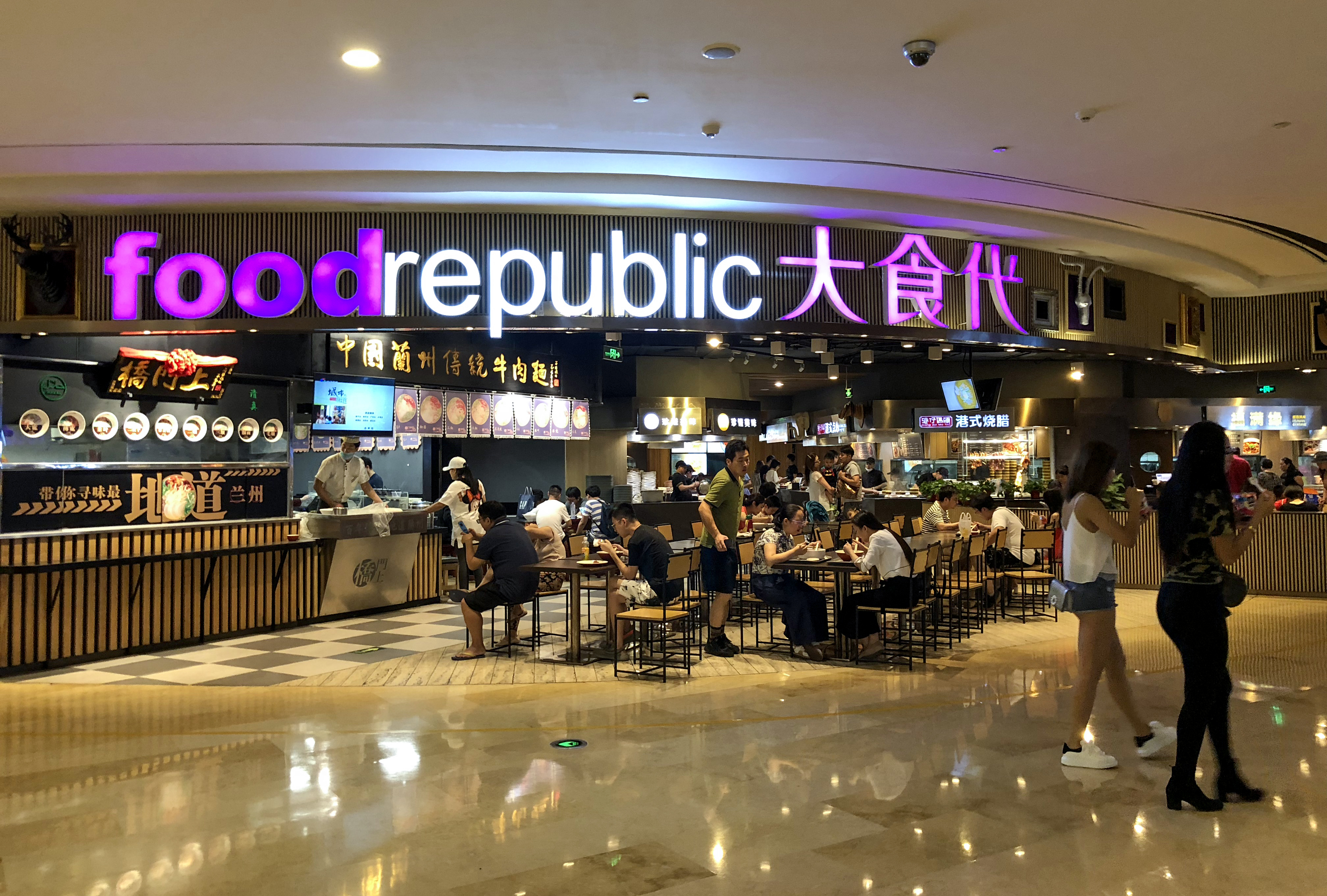
A Lanzhou beef noodle stall at a food court in Beijing, China

A Lanzhou beef noodle restaurant in Khan Uul, Ulaanbaatar, Mongolia

A Lanzhou beef noodle restaurant near Shinjuku Station West Exit in Tokyo, Japan. The overhead signboard says "Silk Road cuisine (Japanese: シルクロード料理)".

== Description ==
Lanzhou beef noodles are usually eaten with chili oil

Lanzhou beef noodles consist of hand-pulled lamian noodles, and clear consommé broth made from stewed beef. It often uses qingzhen (halal) meat and contains no soy sauce, resulting in a lighter taste that may be flavored by salt and herbs. Because of this, it is sometimes called "Qingdun beef noodles" (清炖牛肉面), where qingdun means meat stewed in clear broth without soy sauce.

In halal restaurants, only quality local beef from the Southern Yellow cattle (黄牛; 'yellow cattle') prepared by the local halal butcher is used. Chinese radish and a specially cooked spicy oil are also indispensable partners to Lanzhou beef noodles. To identify the ingredients and the dish, the local government news company suggests preparing the soup by the following five steps: "One Clear, Two White, Three Red, Four Green, Five Yellow" (一清、二白、三红、四绿、五黄). First, the beef soup should look clear; Second, the radish slices should be crystal white; Third, the color of the chili oil should be bright red; Fourth, the cilantro leaves and garlic shoots should be green, and, lastly, the noodle should be smooth and bright yellow. In overseas Chinese communities in North America and Europe, this food can be found in Chinese restaurants. In mainland China, a large bowl of it is often taken as a whole meal with or without side dishes.

== Styles ==
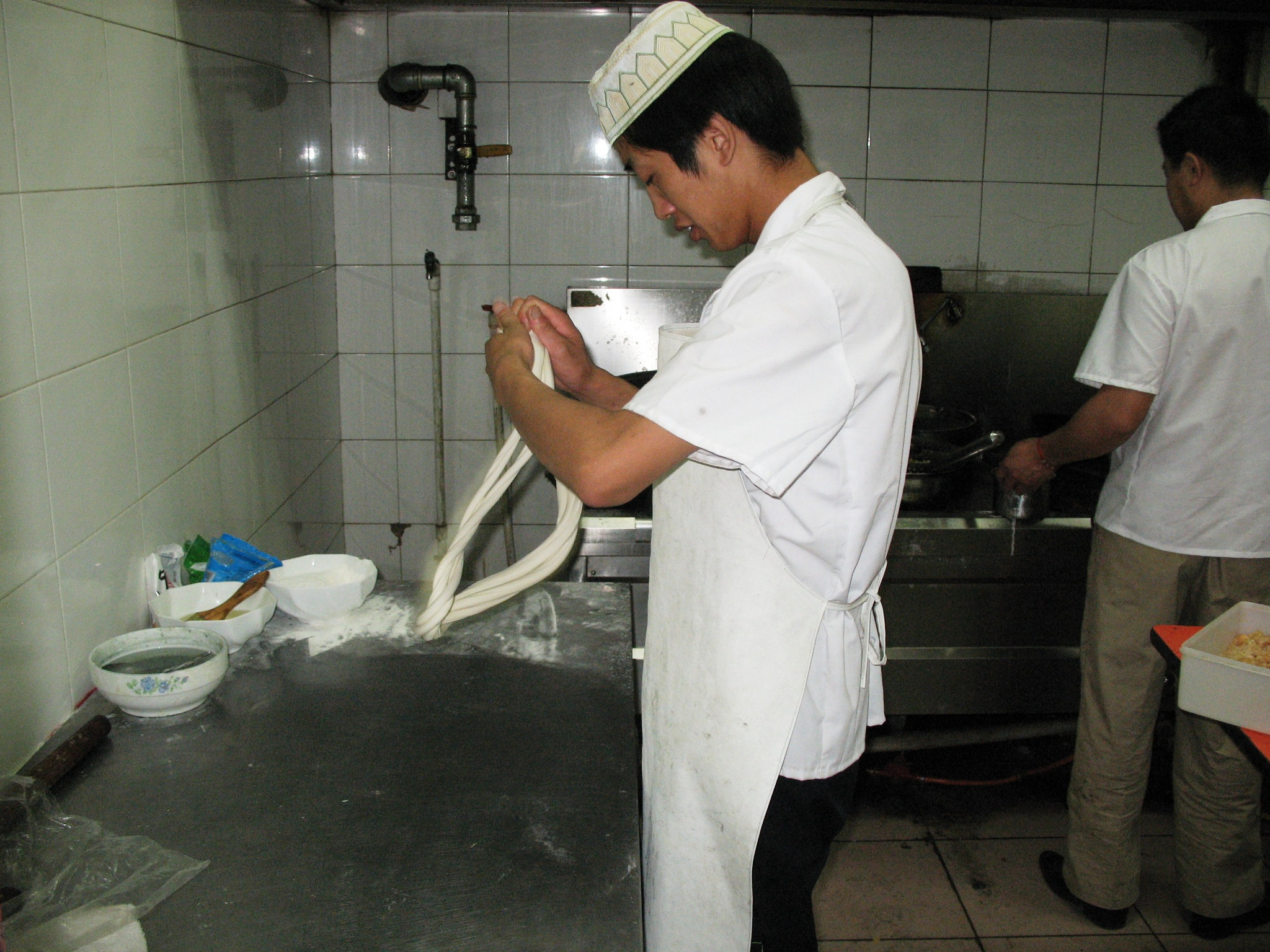
Hand-pulling the noodles

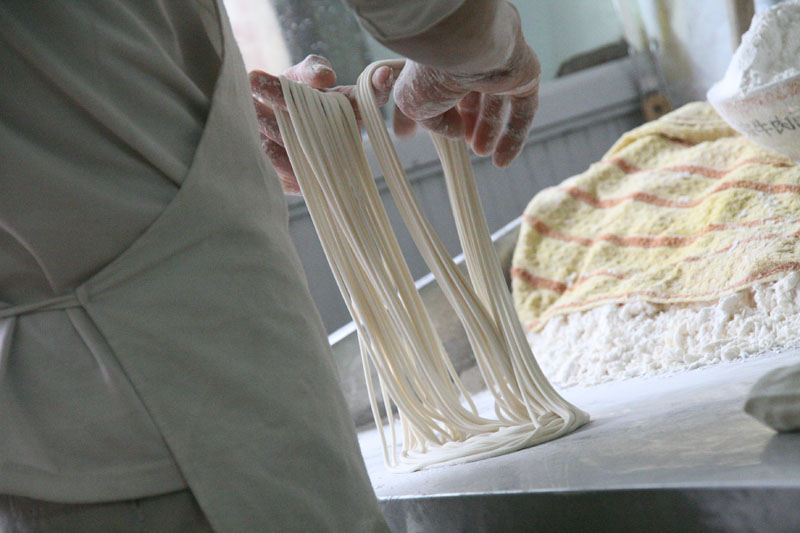
Hand-pulled thin noodles

Traditional Lanzhou beef soup noodle could be made from any one of eight styles of noodles: Thinnest (毛细), Thinner (细面), Thin (三细), Thick (二细), Thicker (粗面), Prism (韭叶), Wide (宽面), and Wider (大宽). Thinnest or hair-thin is "a round noodle about two-thirds of the thickness of a spaghetti", and the thinner style and thin style are just about the size of spaghetti with minimal difference. The thick and thicker style is round noodles that are sized thicker than thin. Prism, wide, and wider are flat thin noodles that provide a different texture. Additionally, a more novel type of noodle is Qiaomaileng (荞麦棱), in which the noodle is highlighted by its angular shape.

Many restaurants across the globe include but are not limited to these seven types of noodle styles. This is because of the evolution of noodle making and the combination of the local culture. In mainland China, restaurants that specialize in Lanzhou beef noodle soup may provide customers to watch how the noodles are made, similar to the food production line layout of Din Tai Fung. The dough for hand-made noodle is normally made the day before being used, but the hand-made noodles are freshly pulled into shapes right before being cooked. The noodle pulling process is quick and can take up to several minutes, including repetitively rolling, pulling, and spinning. As soon as the noodle is shaped, it is placed in boiling water until fully cooked.

== Gallery ==
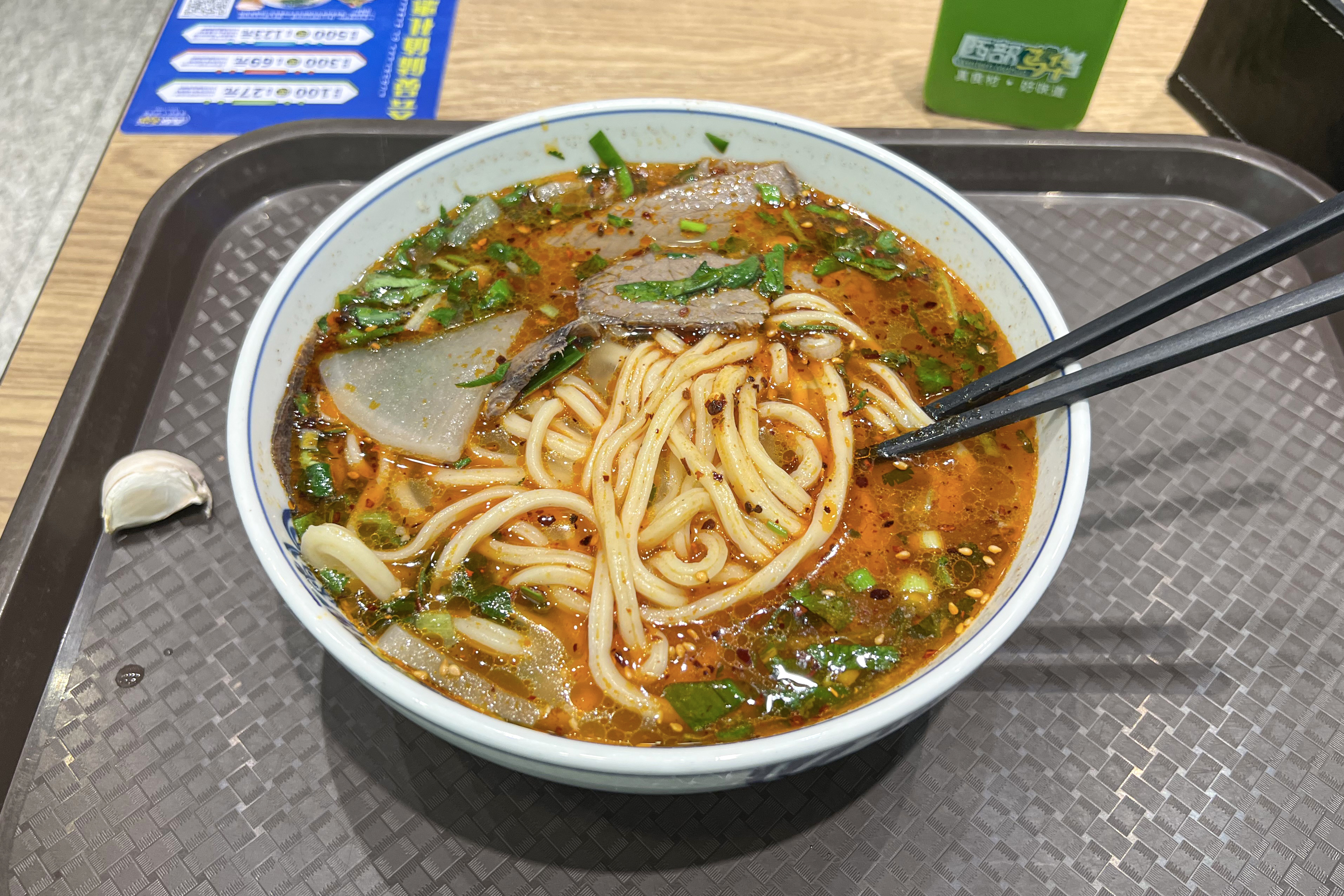

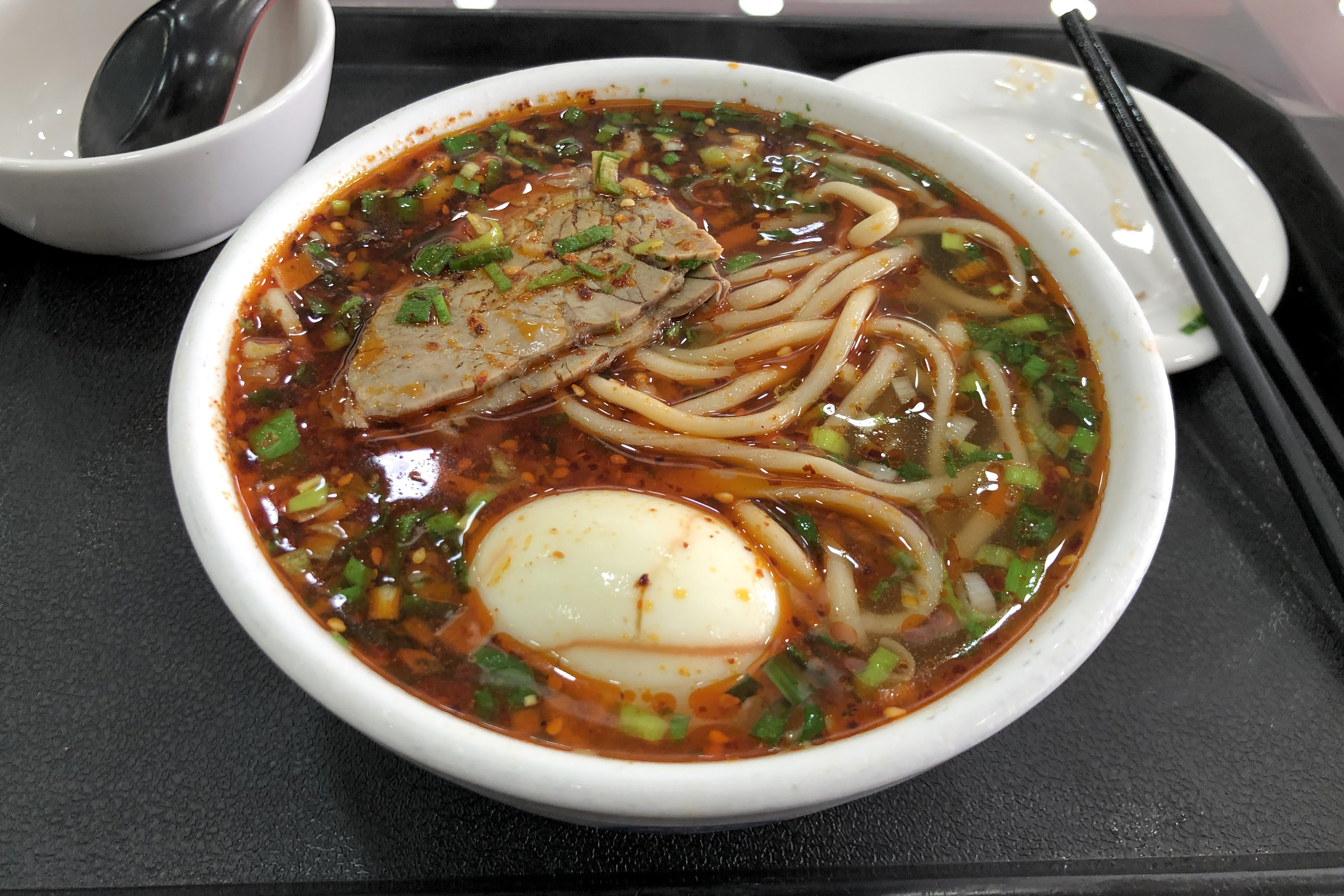

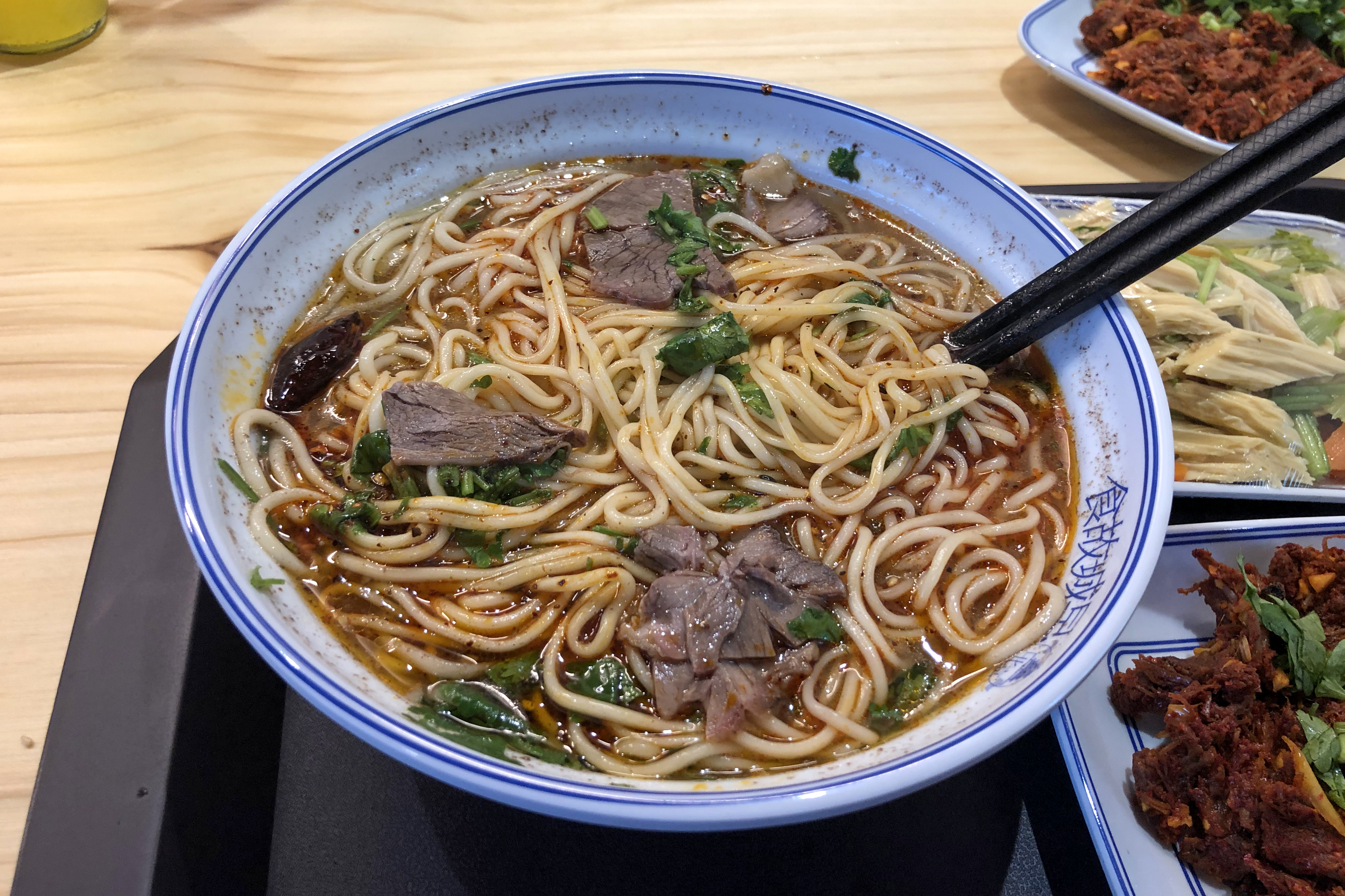

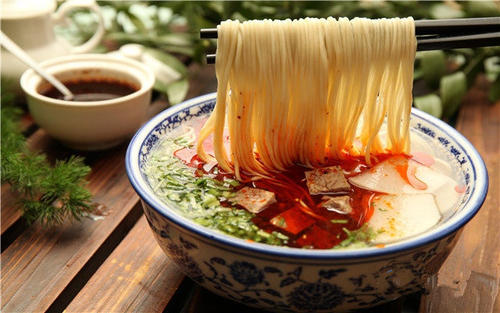

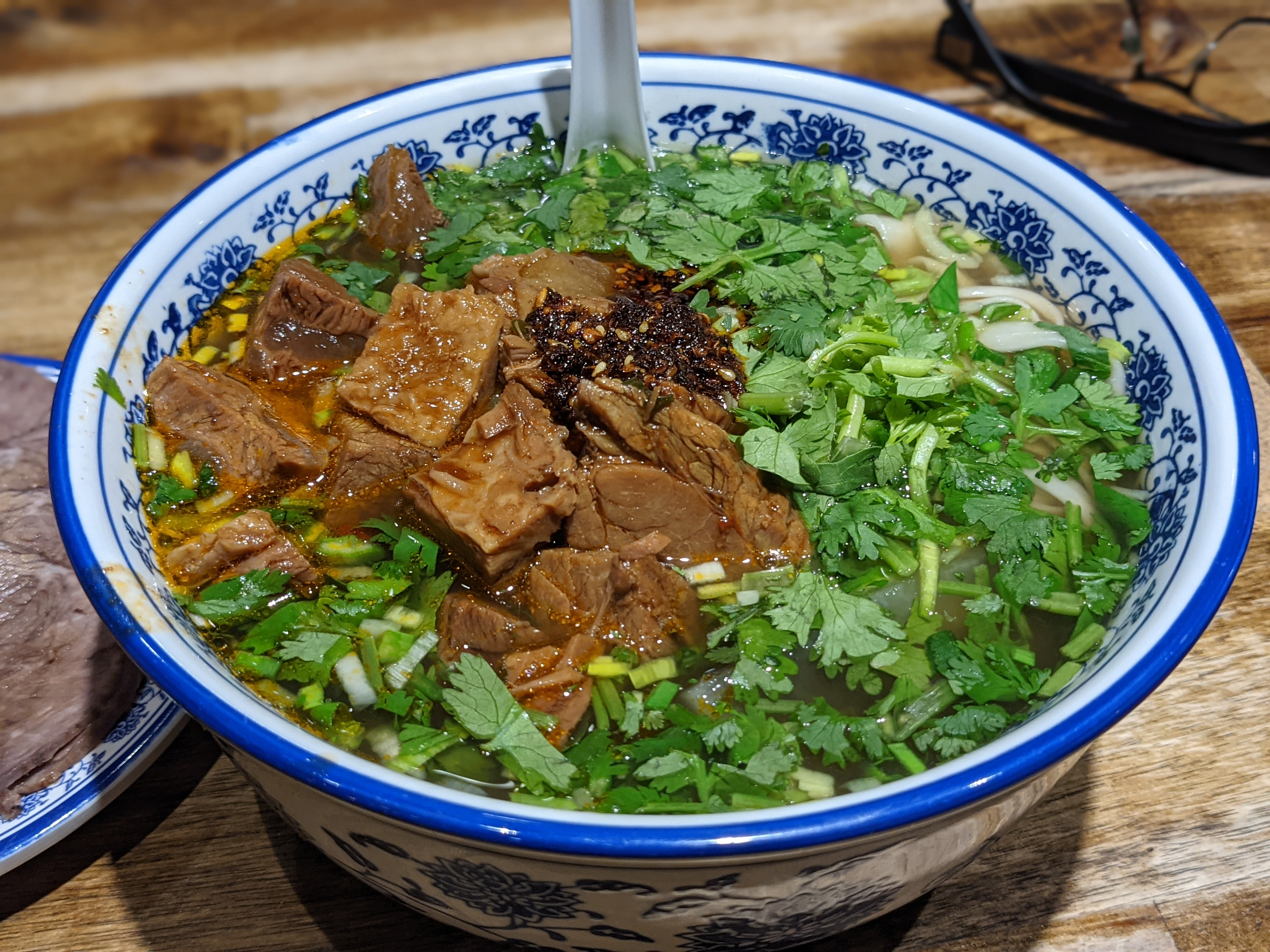
Without chili oil

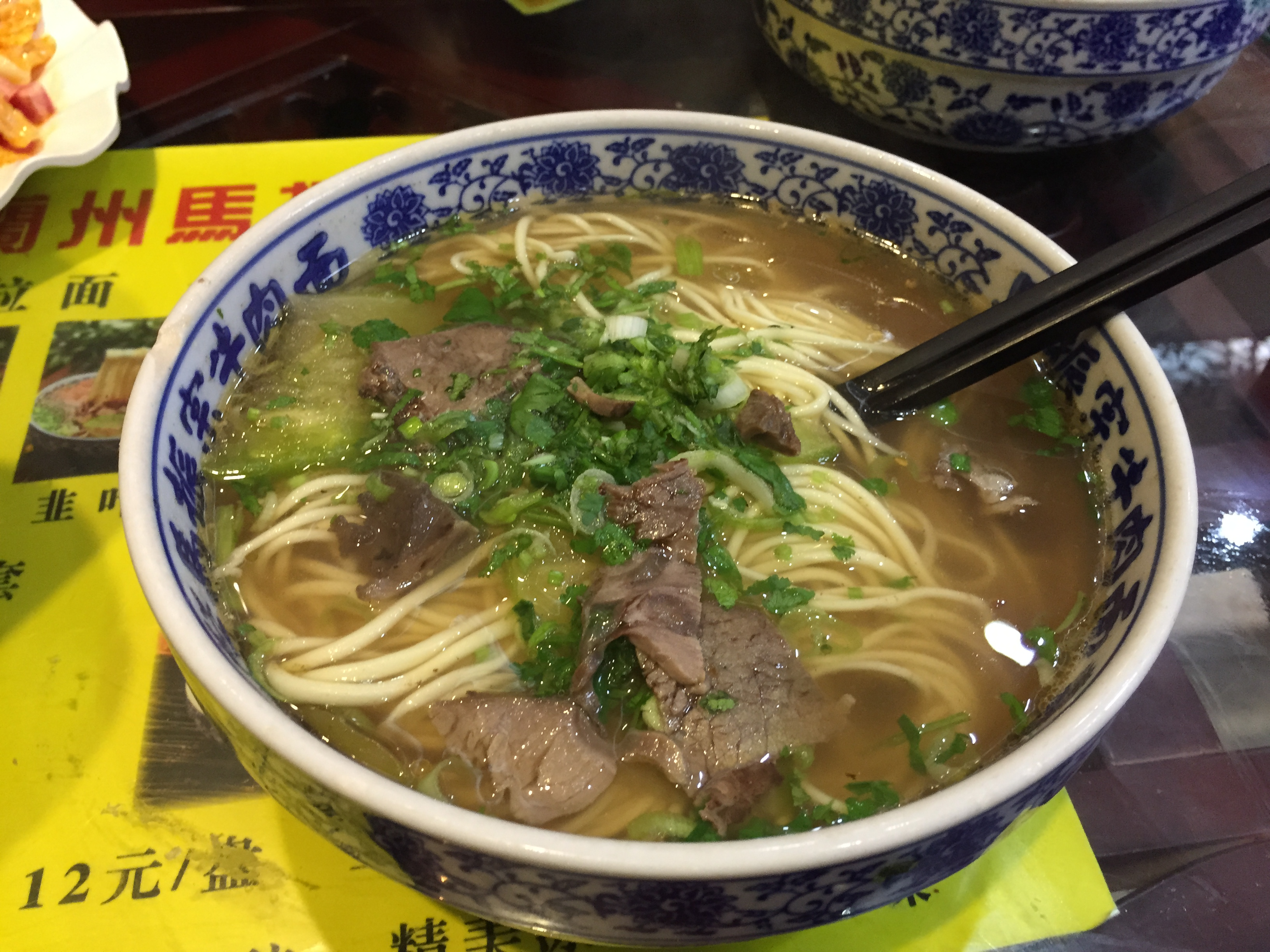
Thin noodles
