= Pekin Noodle Parlor =

Chinese restaurant in Montana, United States, established 1911

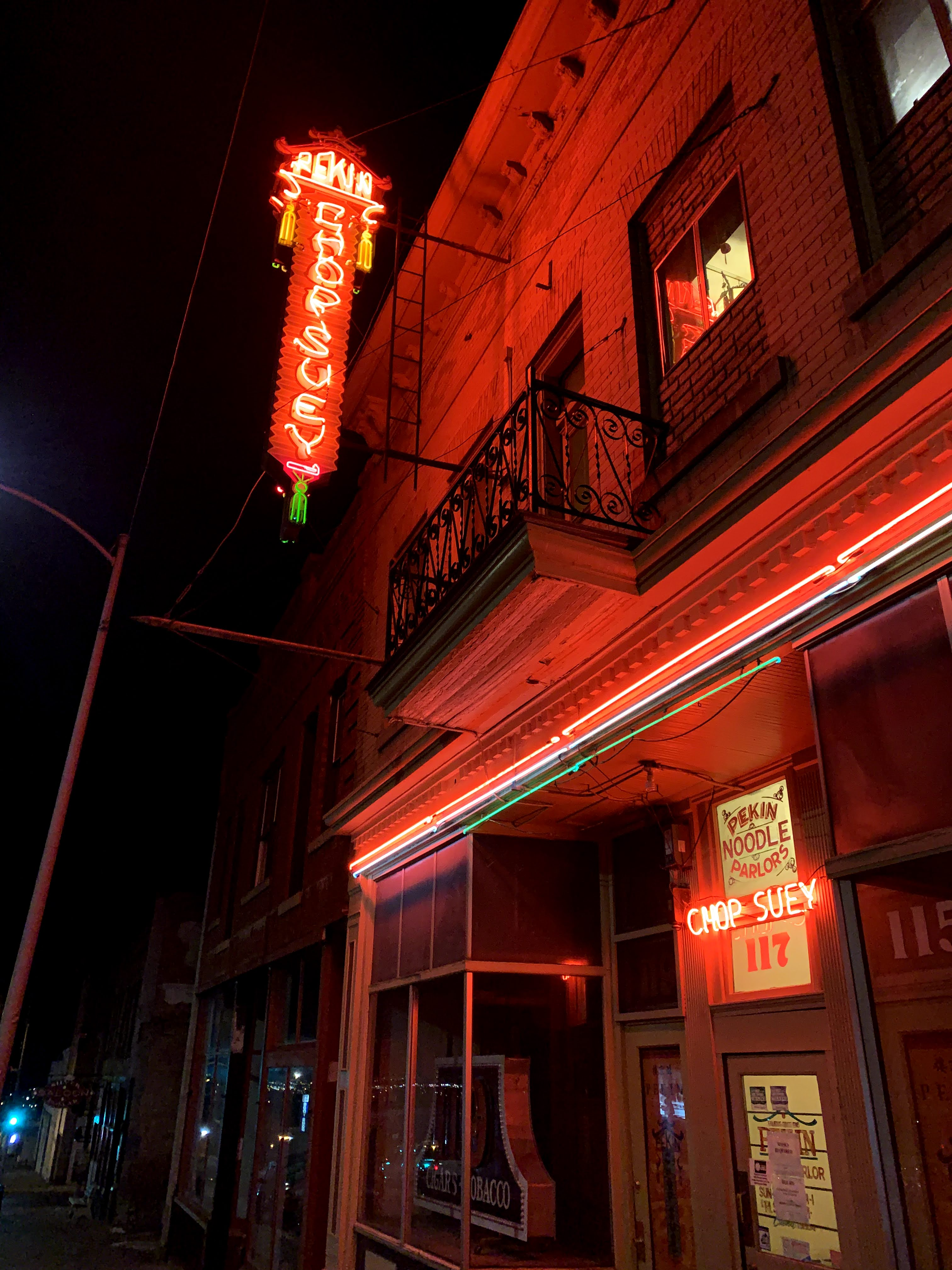
- Pekin Noodle Parlor in 2020

- Location within Montana Location within the United States

Restaurant information
- Established: 1911
- Closed: April 2026
- Owner: Jerry Tam
- Food type: American Chinese cuisine
- Location: 117 South Main Street, Butte, Montana, 59701, United States
- Coordinates: 46°00′42″N 112°32′09″W

Pekin Noodle Parlor (built 1909) was a long-operating Chinese restaurant located in Butte, Montana. The restaurant was founded in 1911 at the 117 South Main Street location by Hum Yow and Tam Kwong Yee.

Along with the Wah Chong Tai Company mercantile building (1891) and the Mai Wah Noodle Parlor (1909), the Pekin Noodle Parlor was one of the last surviving properties from the original Chinatown neighborhood in the Butte–Anaconda Historic District.

The restaurant was named an American Classic by the James Beard Foundation in 2023. After operating for 115 years, the owners announced the restaurant's closure in 2026 due to economic pressures.

== Background ==
Placer gold mining in the late 19th century brought Chinese immigrants to Butte to work the mines. However, anti-Chinese sentiment stoked by labor unions later forced the Chinese out of the mining industry. They eventually settled in Uptown Butte in the 1880s, and opened businesses in a Chinatown neighborhood bordered by West Galena Street in the North, South Main Street in the East, West Mercury Street in the South, and Colorado Street in the West. "China Alley" became a thriving community which may have reached a population of 600 at its height.

Even though attorney Wilbur F. Sanders successfully defended the Chinese people of Butte in Hum Fay, et al. v. Baldwin (also known as the Chinese Boycott Case), the majority of Chinese people left Butte after labor unions organized a sustained campaign of major boycotts of Butte's Chinatown lasting many years in the late 1890s. By 1940, only 92 Chinese people remained.

== History ==
The Tam family left their home in Guangzhou and emigrated to Montana in the 1860s. The elder Tam found work shipping supplies to Chinese communities on the west coast, while his son made his way to Butte in the 1890s and founded the Quong Fong Laundry, which continued serving the community for another fifty years at its South Arizona Street location, as well as a spice import and export business.

Hum Yow, a Tam family relative and California-born, first-generation Chinese, originally started Pekin Noodle Parlor on West Mercury Street. It moved in 1911 to the second floor of a brick building on South Main Street near the corner of West Galena. It was built by architect G. E. DeSnell, designed for Butte attorney F. T. McBride, and completed in 1909. Family relatives Hum Yow and Tam Kwong Yee soon established themselves as businessmen at the new location in Uptown Butte.

When the restaurant first opened, "it catered to a diverse clientele of miners, theater-goers, and wealthy citizens. Then, as now, the menu featured Chinese American classics like chow mein, chop suey, and egg foo young." The restaurant offered a wide variety of dishes on its menu, but customers preferred their wet noodles (yaka mein) and chop suey. Pekin Noodle Parlor also offered takeout and delivery. The restaurant installed their first sign in 1916 and added neon some time later. Neon signs became popular after World War I and were used to attract customers.

Ding Kuen Tam, the grandson of Tam Kwong Lee, left China and came to the U.S. in 1947. He became known as Danny Wong and purchased the business from its founder, his great-uncle Hum Yow, when he retired. Wong ran the establishment for more than six decades with his wife, Sharon Chu. Chu died in 2014 and Wong died in 2020. Their son Jerry Tam most recently ran the restaurant and said his father's immigration story was that of the American Dream.

== Layout and design ==
Patrons enter the second floor restaurant from the ground floor on South Main Street, walking up a flight of stairs to a door on the left. The door opens into a hallway with salmon-orange colored beadboard partitions separating 17 eating rooms and booths on either side with privacy curtains for each room. The dining tables and chairs in each room date back to 1916. The central hallway is lined with Chinese lanterns hanging from the ceiling. Servers deliver food to each booth with metal carts. The original design, for the first 50 years, was based on a light lime green color scheme with dark green velveteen curtains. It was repainted to its current orange color after the owner read an article in Bon Appetit magazine that said a "salmon color whets people's appetites". The first level was at one point an herbal shop and the sub-level hosted illegal gaming.

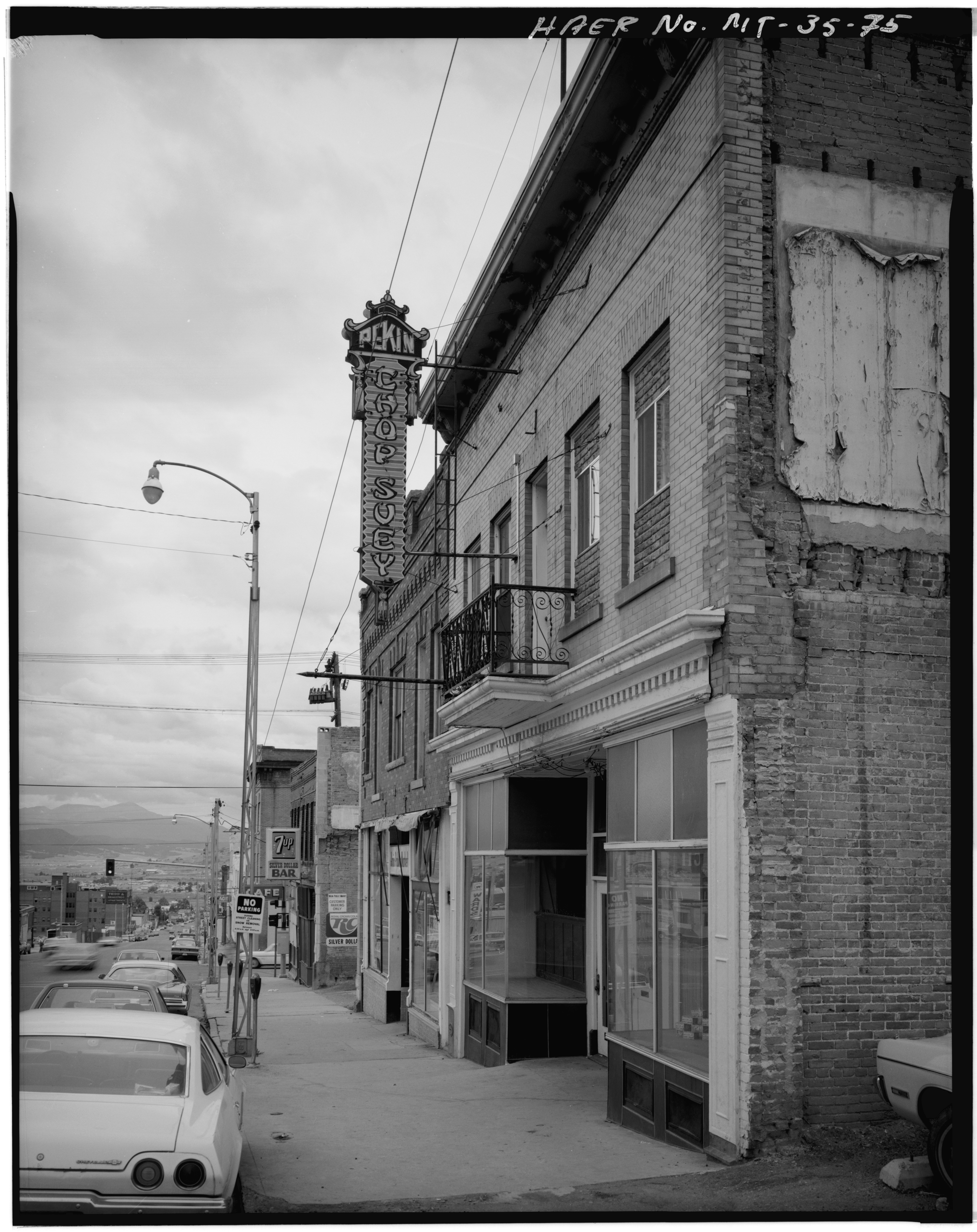
Restaurant exterior in 1979

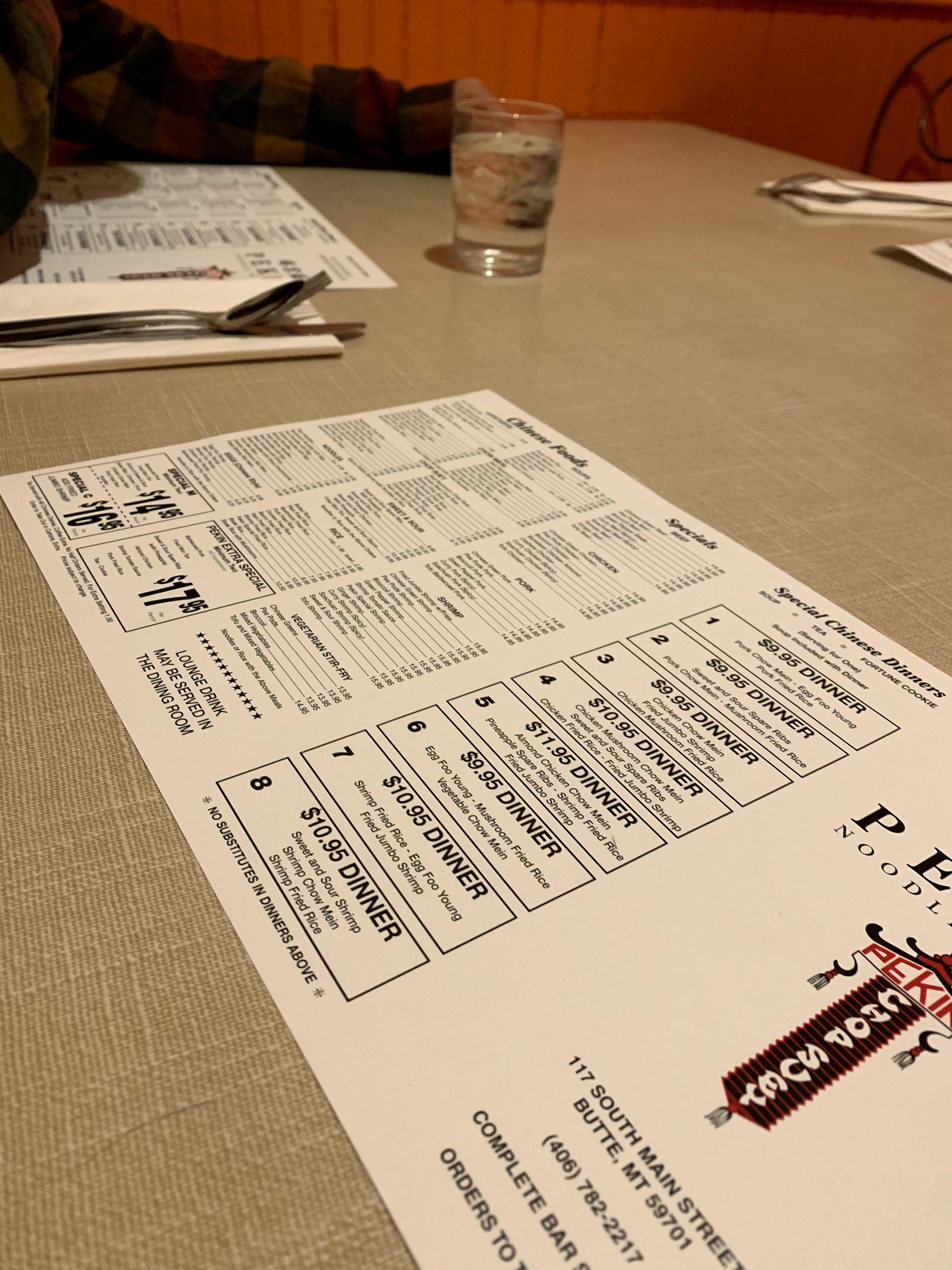
The menu in November 2020
