= Ho Foods =

Taiwanese restaurant in Manhattan, New York

- Interactive map of Ho Foods

Restaurant information
- Established: January 2018
- Location: 110 East 7th Street, New York City, New York, United States
- Coordinates: 40.72641°N 73.98475°W
- Website: www.hofoodsnyc.com

Ho Foods is a Taiwanese restaurant in the East Village of Manhattan in New York City. It is known for its Taiwanese beef noodle soup.

== History ==
Ho Foods was opened in January 2018 by Richard Ho, a chef who had grown up in the San Gabriel Valley to Taiwanese immigrant parents. Back in California, he attended the University of California, Berkeley, where he studied economics, and after which he moved to New York, where he worked at Blue Ribbon Sushi for eight years. He ran various "Ho Foods pop-ups" in 2015–2016 prior to the brick-and-mortar location.

In November 2018, Ho began serving Taiwanese breakfast on weekends at Ho Foods to "re-create the soy-milk shop experience."

In 2024, Ho Foods expanded into its next-door space, adding more seating and extending its hours of service.

== Critical reception ==
Bon Appétit featured Ho Foods in their Highly Recommend column, calling its Taiwanese beef noodle soup "satisfying and cozy and, at the same time, so next-level luxurious."

Fine Dining Lovers named it in a list of five "Must-Try Hidden Gems in New York City," calling it "one of the best Taiwanese beef noodle soups in the city."
