= Mr. Lee (restaurant) =

Fast-food chain in mainland China

Beijing Mr. Lee California Beef Noodle King Co., Ltd.
- Traditional Chinese: 北京李先生加州牛肉麵大王有限公司
- Simplified Chinese: 北京李先生加州牛肉面大王有限公司
Transcriptions
Standard Mandarin
- Hanyu Pinyin: Běijīng Lǐ Xiānsheng Jiāzhōu Niúròumiàn Dàwáng Yǒuxiàngōngsī

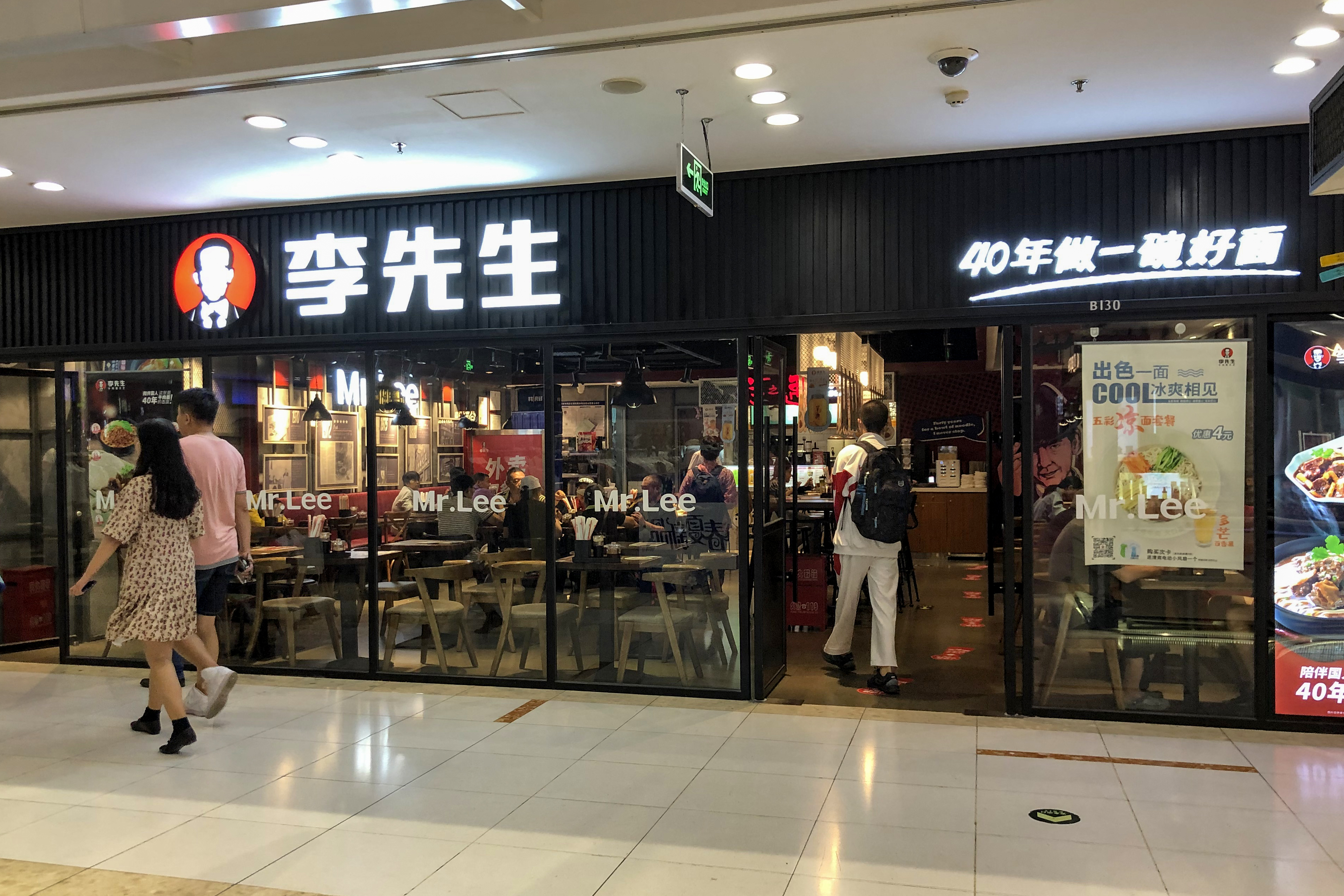
Mr. Lee restaurant in Haidian District, Beijing

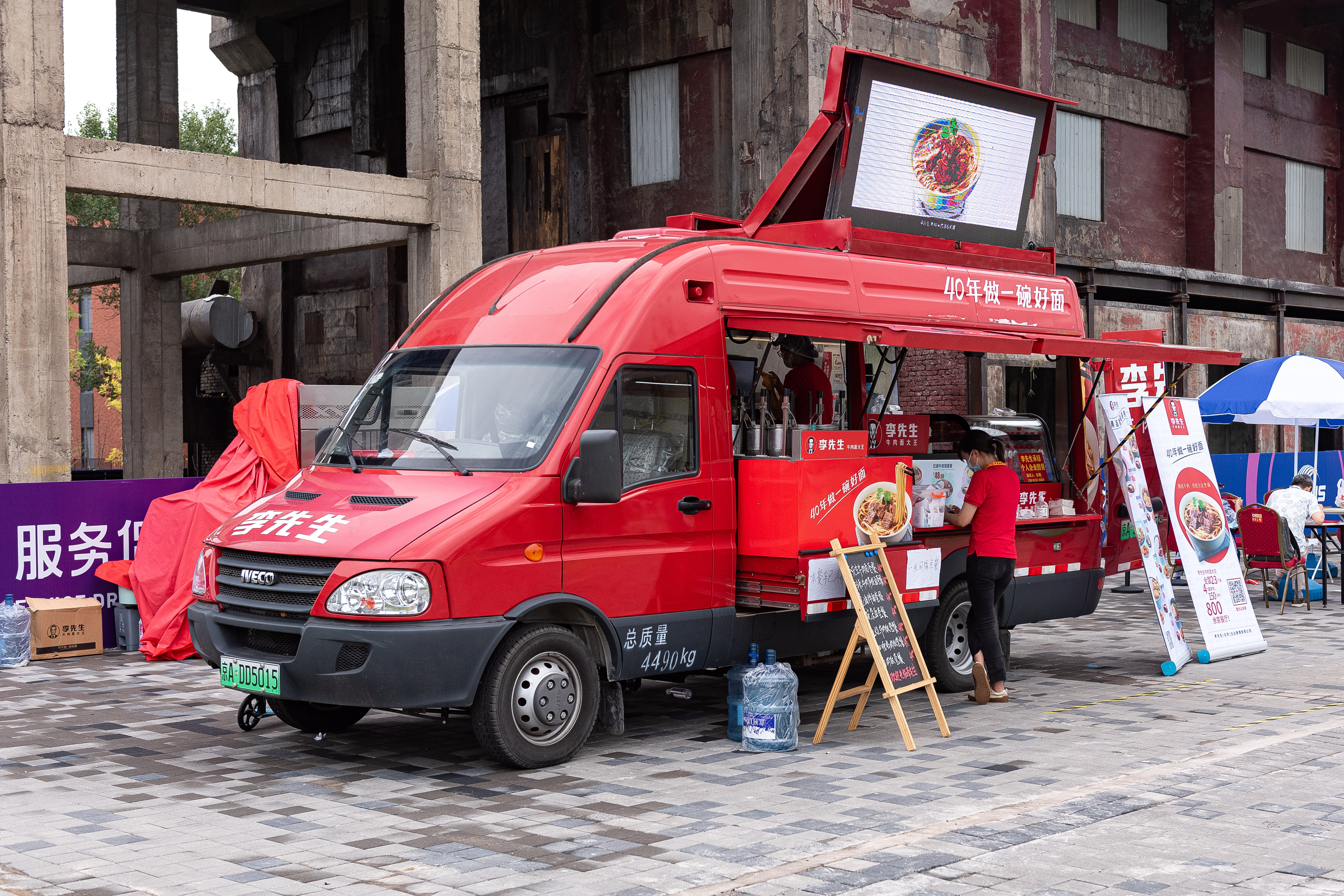
Food van of Mr. Lee

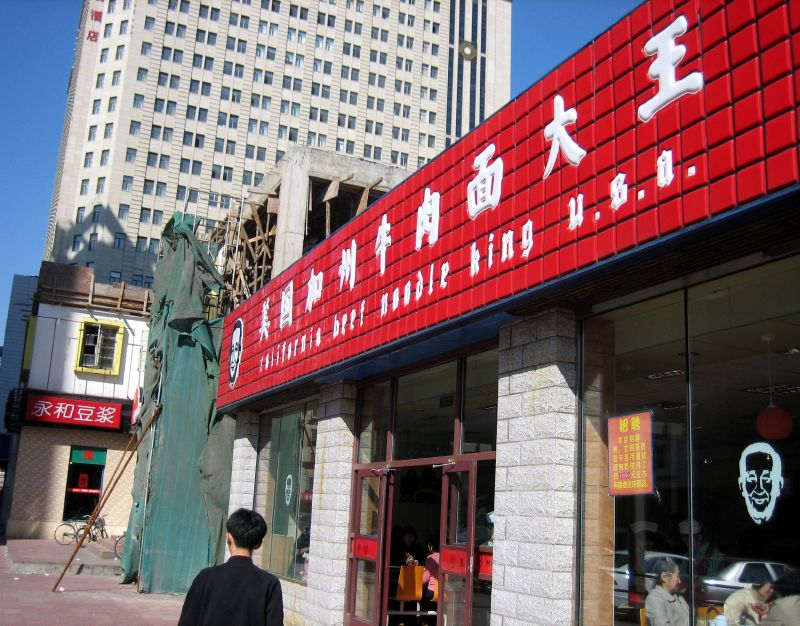
Storefront of a Mr. Lee restaurant before under its former name in Shenyang, China

Mr. Lee (Chinese: 李先生; pinyin: Lǐ Xiānsheng) is a popular fast-food chain in mainland China, specializing in beef noodle soup and other Chinese-style fast food. It is headquartered in Beijing. The chain was formerly called California Beef Noodle King U.S.A. (Chinese: 美国加州牛肉面大王; pinyin: Měiguó Jiāzhōu Niúròumiàn Dàwáng).

The first franchise was opened in Beijing in 1988 by a Californian Chinese-American, Pei Chi Lee (Chinese: 李北祺; pinyin: Lǐ Běiqí), also known as "Mr. Lee". Li's face can be seen as part of the company logo, in a style similar to KFC's Colonel Sanders logo. Today, there are several hundred franchises present in many major Chinese cities. Notable locations include Shanghai, Nanjing, Tianjin, Harbin, Changchun, Qingdao and Shenyang. Mr. Lee competes with foreign franchises such as KFC and McDonald's with lower prices and a greater appeal towards Chinese tastes. The California Chicken ingredients are all from within China and have nothing to do with California.

== Expansion ==
From June 2016, Mr. Lee started opening franchises in Australia, with the first restaurant in Australia being in Burwood.
