= Taiwanese beef noodle soup =

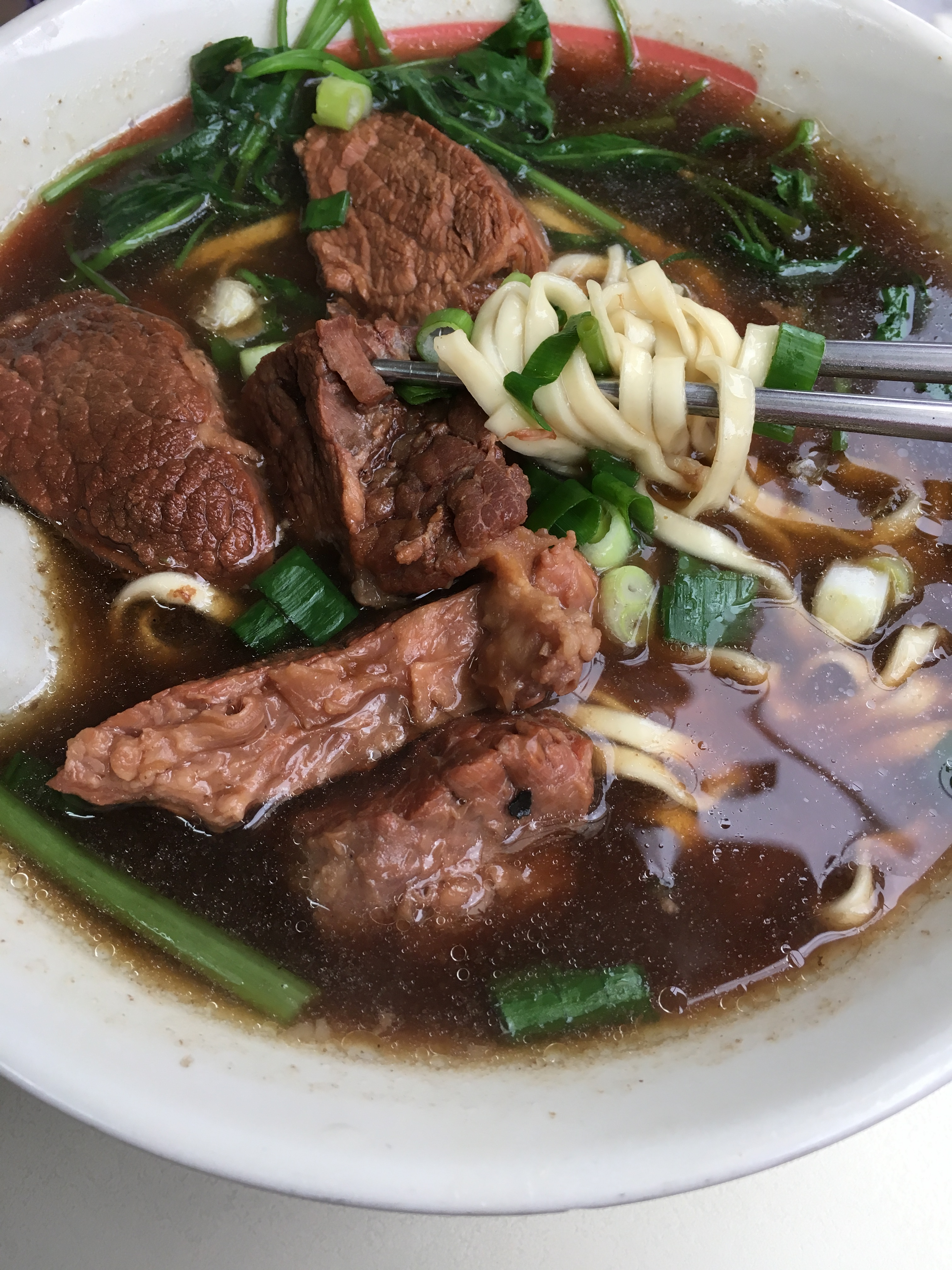
- Taiwanese beef noodle soup in Taipei, Taiwan
- Alternative names: Sichuan beef noodle soup, red braised beef noodle soup
- Type: Noodle soup
- Course: Main course
- Place of origin: Taiwan
- Created by: Kuomintang veterans in Kaohsiung
- Serving temperature: hot
- Main ingredients: Beef, soy sauce, vegetables, Chinese noodles

Taiwanese beef noodle soup (Chinese: 臺灣牛肉麵) is a beef noodle soup dish that originated in Taiwan. It is sometimes referred to as "Sichuanese beef noodle soup" (Chinese: 四川牛肉麵) in Taiwan, although this usage can create confusion as Sichuan has its own versions of beef noodle soups, which may be sold at Sichuanese restaurants under the same name.

== History ==
The dish was created in Taiwan by Kuomintang veterans from Sichuan province who fled from mainland China to Kaohsiung, Taiwan, and served the dish in military dependents' villages. The Taiwanese traditionally had an aversion to the consumption of beef even into the mid-1970s because cattle were valuable beasts of burden, so originally the dish was only eaten by waishengren. However, the dish became more accepted over time and is now one of the most famous dishes in Taiwanese cuisine. It is believed that the popularity of this noodle soup broke the beef-eating taboo and also paved the way to Taiwan's acceptance of American foods that utilized beef (such as hamburgers). The Taiwanese Beef Noodle Soup is significantly less spicy than Sichuan flavors, and there are several variations with the soy-based broth, such as tomato, garlic and herbal medicine. The tomato variation (番茄牛肉麵) is popular in Taiwan and features chunks of tomatoes in a rich red-coloured tomato broth with or without soy sauce.

Taiwanese beef noodle soups are sometimes served as fast food in both Taiwan and mainland China. In China, Mr. Lee is the largest chain, featuring the dish "California Beef Noodle Soup". In Taiwan, Mercuries Beef Noodle (sān shāng qiǎo fú, see zh:三商巧福) is the largest beef noodle fast food franchise, owned by a subsidiary of Mercuries & Associates Holdings (zh:三商企業). It is sometimes considered a national dish in Taiwan, and every year Taipei holds a Beef Noodle Festival, where various chefs and restaurants compete for the title of the "best beef noodles in Taiwan". Due to influences from the influx of immigrants from mainland China in the early 1900s, the Taiwanese version of beef noodle soup is now one of the most popular dishes in Taiwan.

== Preparation ==
The beef is often stewed with the broth and simmered, sometimes for hours. Chefs also let the stock simmer for long periods with bone marrow; some vendors can cook the beef stock for over 24 hours. In Taiwan, beef noodle vendors may also have optional, often cold side dishes, such as braised dried tofu, seaweed or pork intestine. Beef noodles are often served with suan cai (Chinese pickled cabbage or mustard) on top, green onion and sometimes other vegetables in the soup as well.

In addition to the red-braised (hong shao) style, two other variations are widely recognized: the clear-broth (qing dun, 清燉牛肉麵) style without soy sauce, which produces a transparent broth often flavoured with Sichuan peppercorn and white pepper; and the tomato (fanqie, 番茄牛肉麵) variation, which combines stewed tomatoes with the beef broth.

== See also ==
- List of noodle dishes
- List of soups
- Taiwanese cuisine
