= Mai Wah Museum =

- U.S. National Register of Historic Places
- U.S. Historic district – Contributing property
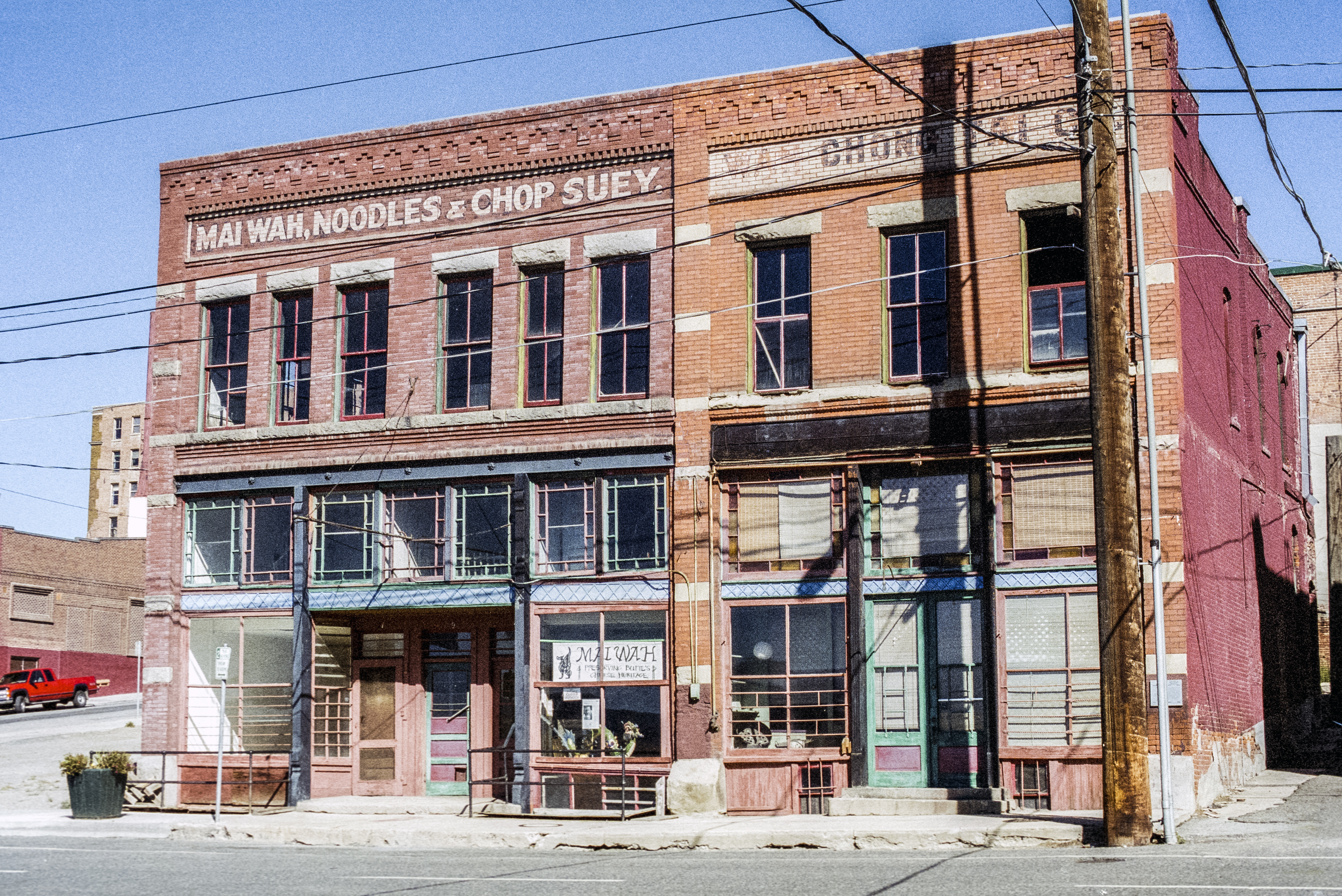
- Mai Wah Society Building

- Location within Montana Location within the United States
- Location: 17 W. Mercury St., Butte, Montana
- Coordinates: 46°0′40.2″N 112°32′9.8″W
- NRHP reference No.: 66000438

The Mai Wah Museum, located in Butte, Montana, United States, is dedicated to documenting the history of Asian people in the Rocky Mountains. The museum is housed in the Wah Chong Tai building and the Mai Wah Noodle Parlor building, located at 17 West Mercury Street.

== History ==
Chin Hin Doon, a member of the Chinn family, relocated to America due to famines and unrest in Guangdong province, seeking a new life. Chinn settled in Butte and became a merchant at the Wah Chong Tai Company by 1894. By the 1930s, his son Albert Chinn, who had attended public schools in Butte, ran the business from the present-day Wah Chong Tai Mercantile and Mai Wah Noodle Parlor buildings, providing services and lodging to the local Chinese people. The Wah Chong Tai Mercantile moved into its present building in 1899 and now stands as the country’s only remaining original Chinese store from the early 20th century. Butte's Chinatown was once the largest between Minneapolis and Seattle. Today, the mercantile and the adjoining Mai Wah Noodle Parlor exhibit 2,500 artifacts dating back to as early as 1905.

In 2018, the Mai Wah Museum secured $133,000 through a Partners in Preservation grant to restore the exteriors of the two buildings that comprise the museum. The Partners in Preservation campaign highlighted sites that help tell stories of diversity and the fight for equality. The online voting concluded with the Mai Wah Museum ranking in the No. 6 position among 20 finalists.

== See also ==
- Pekin Noodle Parlor
