= Beef noodle soup =

Category of noodle dishes

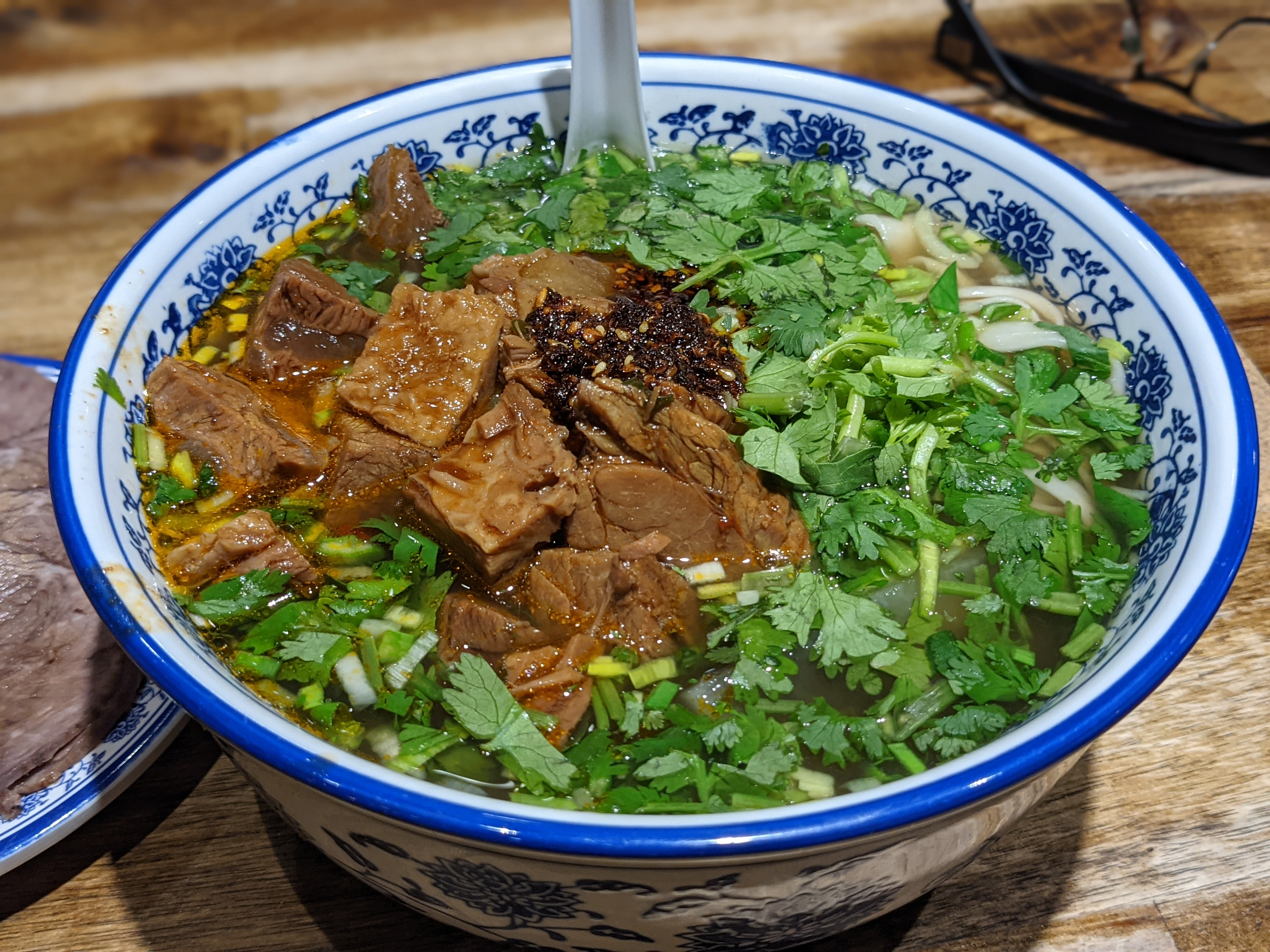
- Lanzhou beef noodles
- Type: Noodle soup
- Region or state: East Asia and Southeast Asia
- Main ingredients: Beef, beef broth, vegetables, Chinese noodles

Beef noodle soup
- Traditional Chinese: 牛肉麵
- Simplified Chinese: 牛肉面
- Literal meaning: Beef noodles
Transcriptions
Standard Mandarin
- Hanyu Pinyin: niúròu miàn
other Mandarin
- Xiao'erjing: ﻧِﯿَﻮْ ژِﻮْ ﻣِﯿًﺎ
- Dungan: Нюроў мян
Hakka
- Romanization: ngiu nguk mien
Yue: Cantonese
- Jyutping: ngau4 juk6 min6
Southern Min
- Hokkien POJ: gû-bah mī

Beef noodle soup is a noodle soup made of stewed or braised beef, beef broth, vegetables and noodles.

One of the oldest beef noodle soups is the Lanzhou niuroumian (蘭州牛肉麵), or Lanzhou beef noodle soup, which was created by the Hui people of northwest China during the Tang dynasty. There are numerous beef noodle soups available in China with a higher variety in the west than the east.

Another common variety is the red-braised beef noodle soup (紅燒牛肉麵) from Taiwan, which was first created by Sichuanese Kuomintang veterans; it is commonly known as Taiwanese beef noodle soup in English.

Other beef noodle soup varieties include pho from Vietnam.

== East Asian varieties ==
=== Lanzhou beef noodle soup ===
Lanzhou beef noodles are the version most commonly seen in mainland China, and are a Chinese Muslim style of beef noodle, also known as clear-broth or consommé-stewed beef noodle (清燉牛肉麵). They often use halal (or qingzhen) meat and contain no soy sauce, resulting in a lighter taste that may be flavoured by salt and herbs. Local lore attributes their creation to Ma Baozi, a Hui Chinese man from Lanzhou. In Lanzhou, capital of Gansu, Lanzhou beef lamian (蘭州牛肉拉麵) is usually served with clear soup and one hand-pulled lamian noodle per bowl. In halal restaurants, only quality local beef from the Southern Yellow cattle (Chinese: 黃牛; lit. 'yellow cattle') prepared by the local halal butcher is used for the beef noodle. Chinese radish and specially cooked spicy oil are also indispensable partners to Lanzhou beef noodles. These ingredients are known as "One Clear, Two White, Three Red, Four Green, Five Yellow" (Chinese: 一清、二白、三紅、四綠、五黃; pinyin: Yī qīng, èr bái, sān hóng, sì lǜ, wǔ huáng), referring to clear soup, white radish, red chili oil, green leek and yellow noodles respectively. In overseas Chinese communities in North America, this food can be found in Chinese restaurants. In mainland China, a large bowl of it is often taken as a whole meal with or without any side dish.

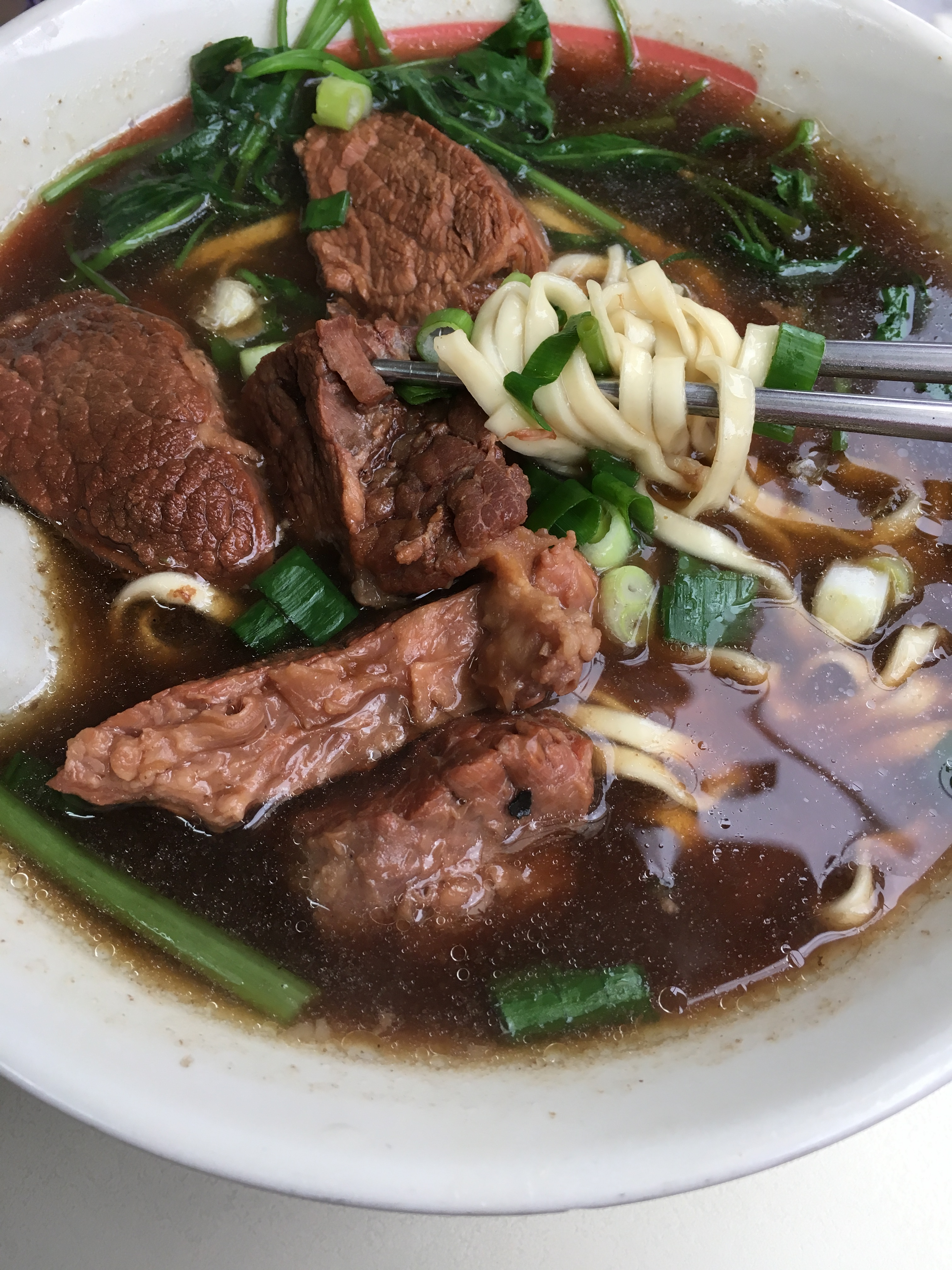
Taiwanese beef noodle soup in Taipei, Taiwan

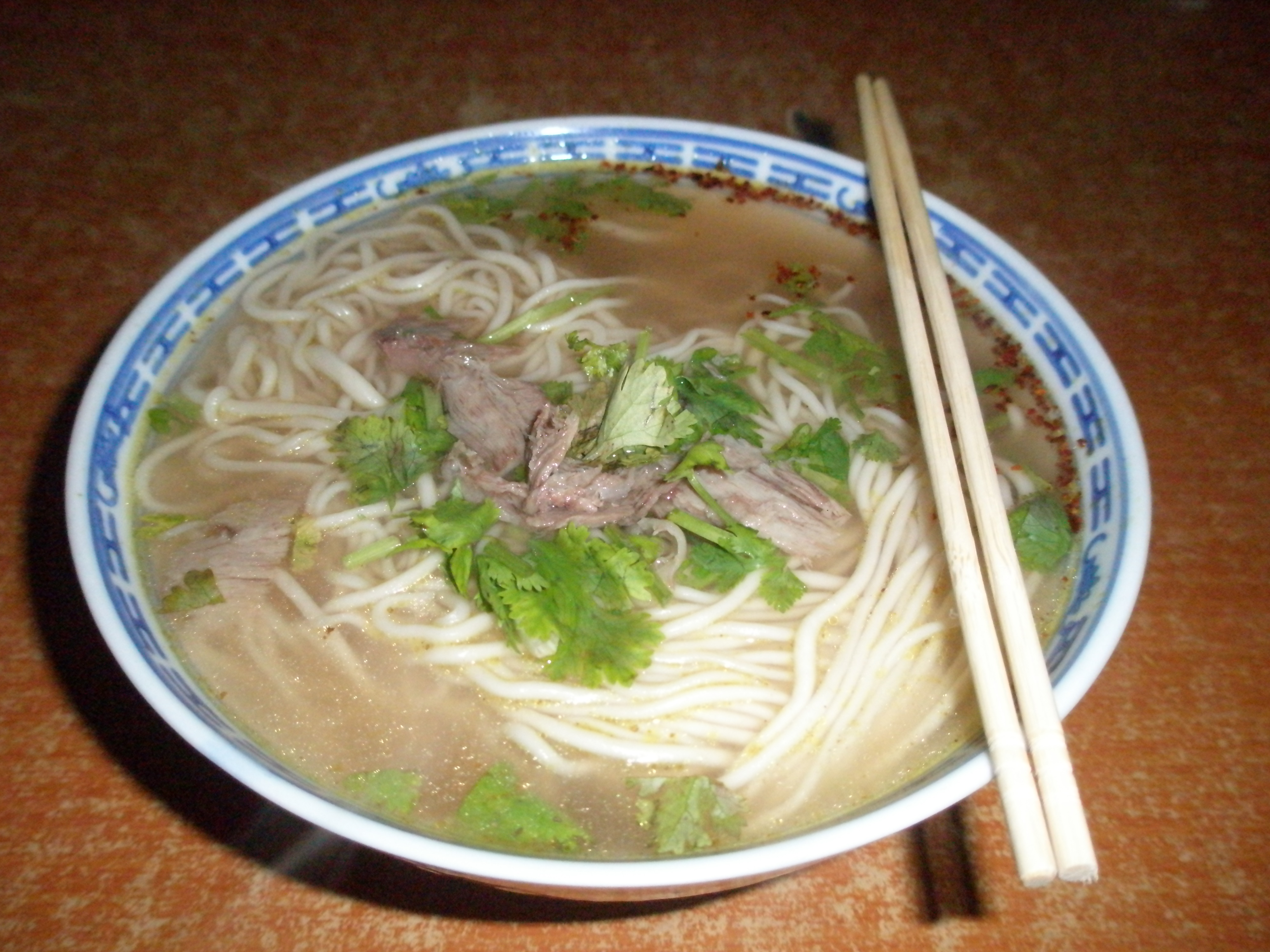
Lanzhou beef noodle soup, with clear soup and hand-pulled noodles

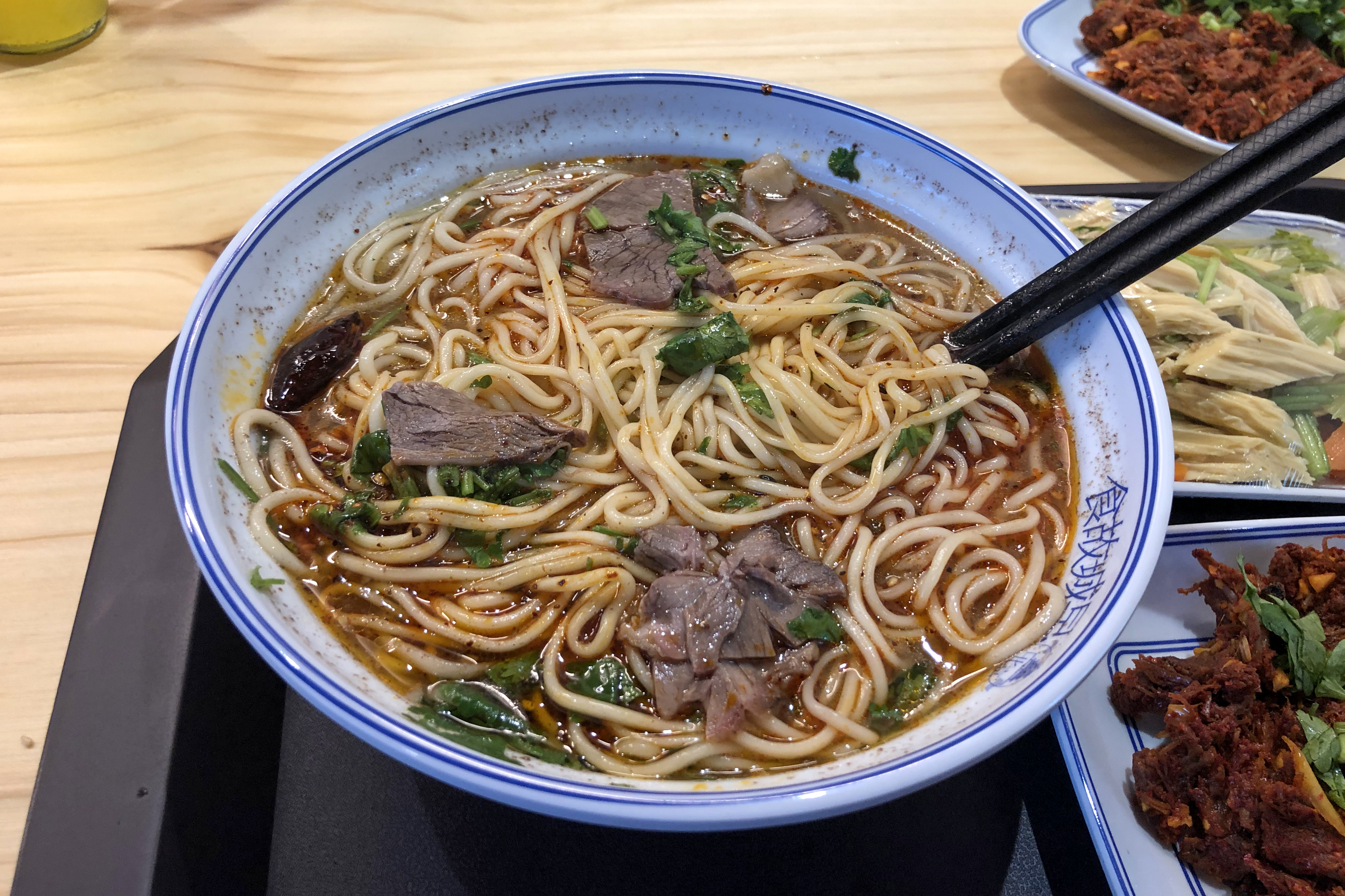
Lanzhou-style beef noodle soup with chili oil

=== Taiwanese beef noodle soup ===
Taiwanese beef noodle soup is a noodle soup dish originating from Taiwan. It is sometimes referred to as "Sichuan beef noodle soup" (四川牛肉麵), especially in Taiwan. This usage can create confusion, as Sichuan has its own versions of beef noodle soups which may be sold at Sichuanese restaurants under the same name. The beef is often stewed with the broth and simmered, sometimes for days. Chefs also let the stock simmer for long periods with bone marrow; some vendors can cook the beef stock for over 24 hours. In Taiwan, beef noodle vendors may also have optional, often cold side dishes, such as braised dried tofu, seaweed or pork intestine. Beef noodles are often served with suan cai (Chinese sauerkraut) on top, green onion and sometimes other vegetables in the soup as well.

== Southeast Asian varieties ==
=== Singapore ===
In Singapore, several different beef noodle dishes exist. One dish known as Teochew beef noodles was invented by Teochew immigrants to Singapore. In this version, the noodles are served in soup. The broth used brewed with beef bones before kway teow (flat Chinese noodles) are added alongside slices of beef and beef innards. Traditionally, the beef extract Bovril was added to the stock, and extras such as beef tongue, beef tripe or gu piang (Chinese: 牛鞭; Pe̍h-ūe-jī: gû-piang; Peng'im: ghu^{5} biang^{1}; meaning bull's penis) were offered as well.

=== Thailand ===
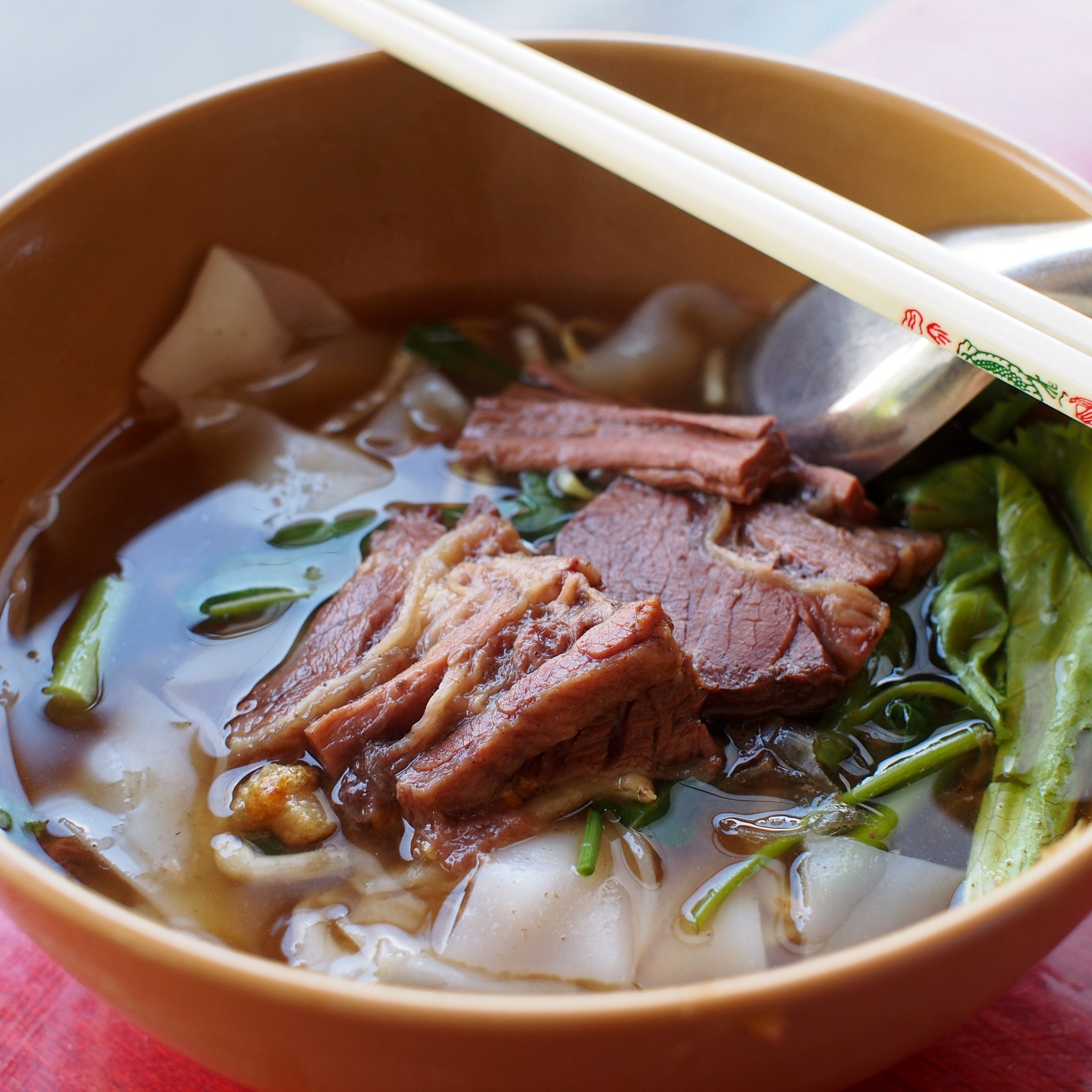
A bowl of kuaitiao nuea pueay in Chiang Mai, Thailand. This is the Thai version of braised beef noodles.

In Thailand, kuaitiao nuea pueay is a similar dish of braised beef served with rice noodles.

=== Vietnam ===
In Vietnam, pho is a Vietnamese noodle soup that contains broth, rice noodles called bánh phở, herbs and meat, primarily made with either beef (phở bò) or chicken (phở gà). Bò kho is a beef stew sometimes served with noodles (or bread as an alternative). In the Philippines, beef mami is very popular and can also be combined with pares.

== North American varieties ==
Yaka mein is a type of beef noodle soup commonly found in Chinese restaurants in New Orleans. It consists of stewed beef, spaghetti noodles, hard-boiled egg and chopped green onions, with Cajun seasoning, chili powder or Old Bay-brand seasoning.

== See also ==
- Chinese Islamic cuisine
- Chinese noodles
- Instant noodles
- List of Chinese soups
- List of noodle dishes
- List of soups
- Noodle soup
- Pho
- Ramen
- Taiwanese cuisine
- Bún bò Huế
