= Sheepskin raft =

Type of boat

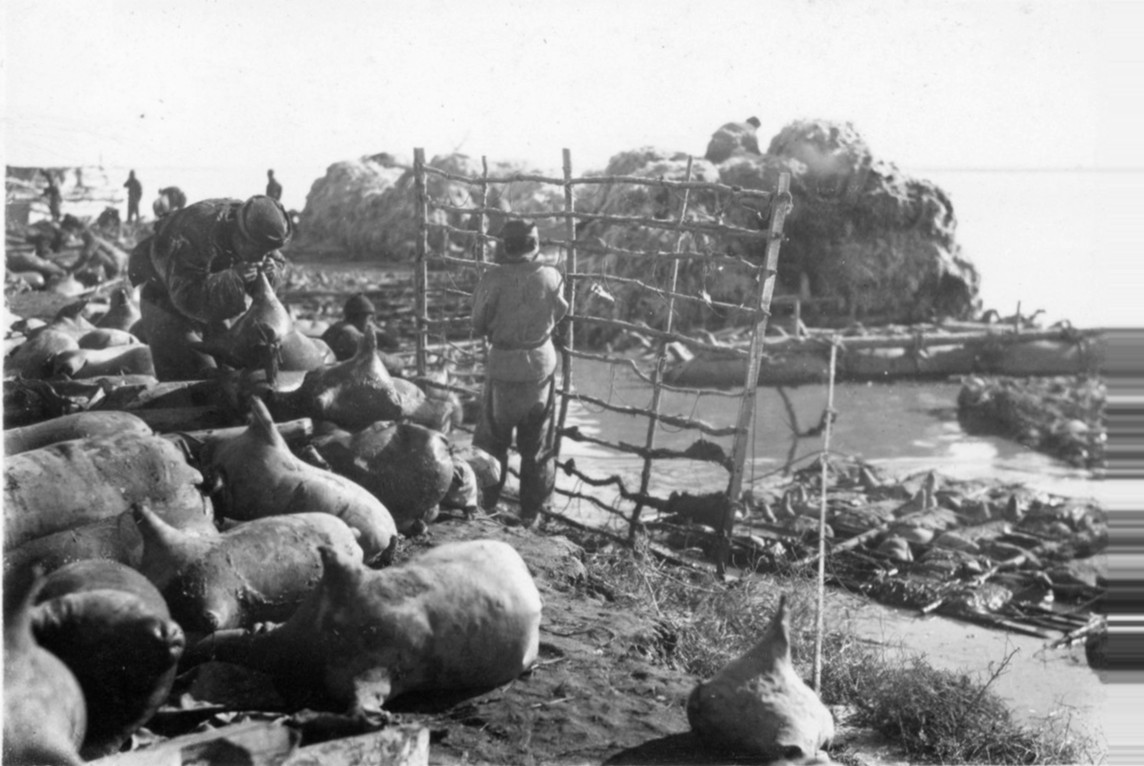

The sheepskin raft is a kind of boat made of a wood frame and aerated sheepskin. A big sheepskin raft can be made from 600 sheepskin bags while small rafts are generally composed of 13 sheepskin bags. Sheepskin rafts are popular along the Yellow River in provinces like Gansu, Ningxia, and Qinghai.

== Background/History in China ==
One of the anecdotes about the origin of the sheepskin rafts is that in 1843, an old man in Lanzhou tried to cross the Yellow River with his cattle, but his cattle accidentally fell into the river. Then, to his surprise, he discovered that his cattle swam across the river by itself, so he killed and skinned his cattle after he got home. He sewed the cattle hide into a bag, covered it with oil, and then used it to cross the river. His neighbors improved his invention and tied hide bags together, which became the hide raft of today.

Another anecdote is that the hide rafts were invented by Tibetan people. It was said that they had the tradition of carrying clothes within hide bags when crossing the rivers to keep the clothes dry and afloat. This tradition later evolved into hide rafts that can carry people.

The sheepskin raft was called "Huntuo"(浑脱) during the Song dynasty. During that period of time, the sheepskin raft was used as a means of water transportation that made crossing the Yellow River more convenient. It didn't participate in economic activities.

Between 1840 and 1938, as international trades started to flourish in China, sheepskin rafts and raftsmen played an important part in trading along the Yellow River. During that period, it was mostly used to transport goods like leather, hookah, and wool from the northwest region of China to its east coast.

After 1940, sheepskin rafts were used less and less because of the degradation of the ecological environment in the Yellow River.

From 1950 to 1954, sheepskin rafts began to be used again in long-distance transportation because of environmental management of the Yellow River. Instead of transporting goods, sheepskin rafts were more frequently used to carry passengers during this period of time. Many farmers from the riverbank become raftsmen when they were not busy with farm work.

However, after 1957, the sheepskin rafts were considered remnants of capitalism and subsequently banned by the government.

From 1966 to 1976, the long-distance transportation industry using the sheepskin rafts became extinct. The sheepskin rafts existed only in the daily lives of people in Gansu and Qinghai.

Nowadays, sheepskin rafts are no longer used as a water transportation, but as a tourist attraction and cultural symbol.

== Construction Methods ==
The sheepskin raft is generally composed of thirteen sheepskin leather bags. First, wood is used to make the frame of the boat. In most cases people will use willow. Then, two willow branches are cut flat. Several nests are chiseled out on the flat surface, and the willow branch are inserted into it. The frame is then tied up with ropes.

For making sheepskin leather bags, use the whole skin of the sheep, inflate the skin bag and pour into some oil, water, and salt. Then, tighten up the head and tail, and let it dry. After skinning, remove other parts of the sheep, and tan the skin. After tanning, inject some clear oil and salt water. Sheepskin bags in this process are also called "cooked leather". Finally, dip the twine into the oil and wait for it dry. A sheepskin bag can last for three to four years if used carefully.

Rafters blow air into the sheepskin bag and tie the bags under the woody frame, and then the boat is ready for use.

== In Modern China ==
During the second world war, the Japanese army blocked the military supplies of the Chinese army along Jialing River. Lanzhou sheepskin raft chamber of commerce sent two skilled workers to the capital Chongqing with sheepskin rafts, which later carried military supplies and soldiers across the river. Sheepskin rafts are considered an important contributor to the Sino-Japanese war and a symbol of Chinese patriotism.

Starting from the late 20th century, the transport function of sheepskin raft has faded as the result of the development of the water transport system in China. The transportation function of sheepskin raft carrying people and goods has gradually changed into a tourism activity. Rafters work as "characteristic tour guides" along the river bank in Lanzhou, and sheepskin rafts carry tourists on a Yellow River Cruise. Sheepskin raft, as an original heritage object of Chinese ancient civilization, has become a cultural symbol of Gansu province and the Yellow River.

To adjust to the tourist season, sheepskin raft tours usually run from May to October each year, with peak seasons in July and August. In winter and early spring, sheepskin boats are repaired and rafters make new sheepskin bags for the rafts.

Many people in China, especially the sheepskin rafters, are worried about the future of sheepskin raft since few young people are willing to devote their lives to passing on this traditional craft. Sheepskin raft is facing the danger of extinction in the next generation.

== Preservation ==
Some ways to preserve and develop the sheepskin raft are to strengthen support funding and qualifications recognition for those who are still working in the trade, to establish agencies and institutions specialized in the sheepskin raft, to strengthen protection on the cultural front, to standardize the management of securing the immaterial inheritance, to build the sports tourism brand on the Yellow River, and to depend on sheepskin raft sporting events to fasten the development of industrialization.

== Sheepskin Raft in Other Regions ==
Sheepskin rafts were commonly used by Armenians. In 1000 B.C. or older, there were rafts made of inflated sheepskins. In a journal published in 1902, the geographer Ellsworth Huntington described how the local Armenians made the "kellek" (the Turkish term for a sheepskin raft). The whole sheepskin raft was soaked to aid in pliability, making it easier to use. In the morning, they were blown and inflated through neck. When they found a hole in the skin, they immediately used a piece of wood against the inside of the hole to tie the skin firmly around it. One raft had about thirty pieces of skins and normally, only a couple sit on the raft and go fishing. The raftsmen themselves were called "kellekjis".
