= Yaka mein =

Beef noodle soup

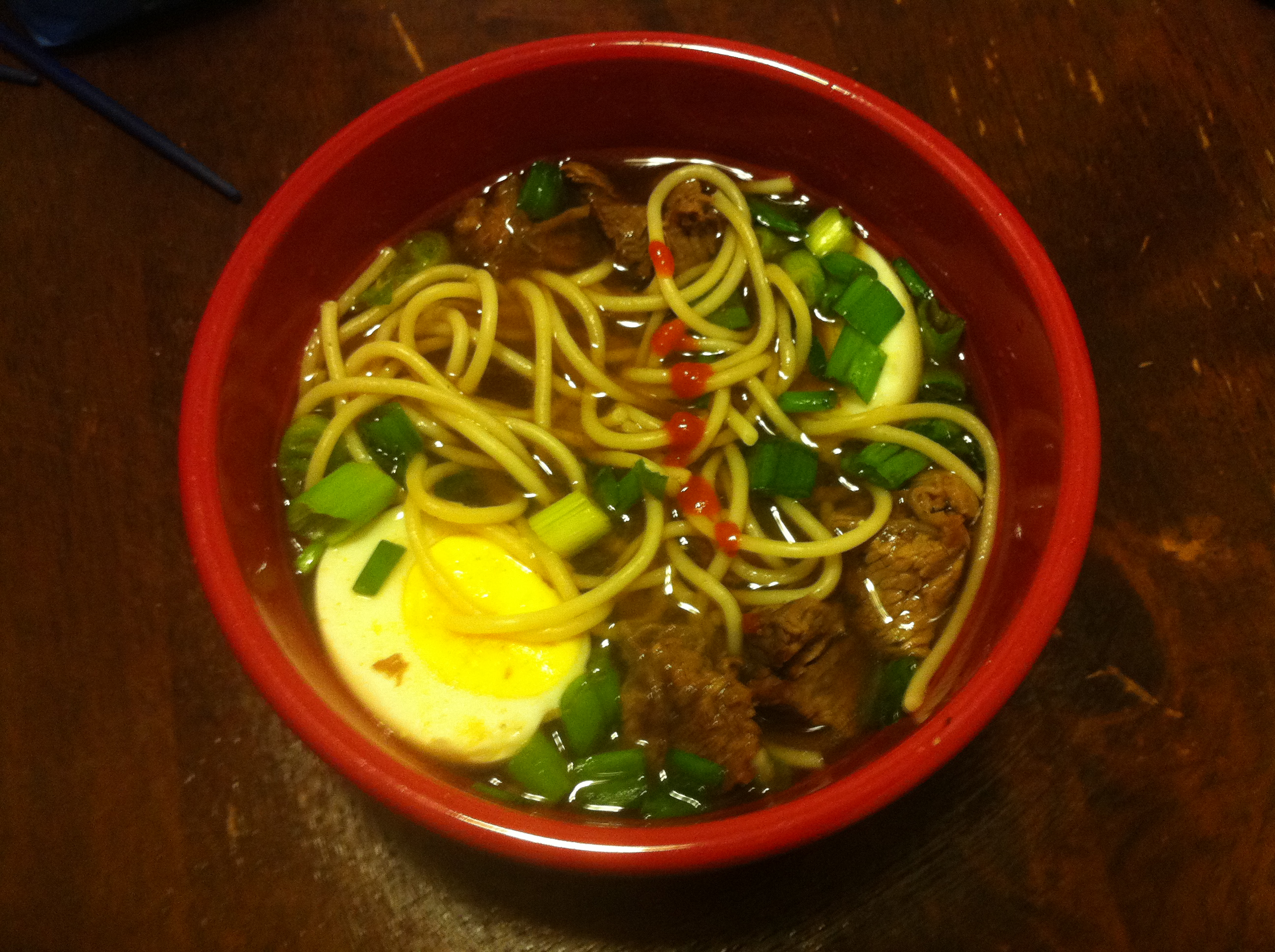
- Yaka mein served in a bowl
- Alternative names: Old Sober, low-rent lo mein, Seventh Ward mein, yat gaw mein, dirty yak, yock, box of yock
- Type: Beef noodle soup Chinese noodle
- Place of origin: Louisiana
- Main ingredients: Stewed beef (brisket), beef broth, spaghetti, hard-boiled egg, green onions

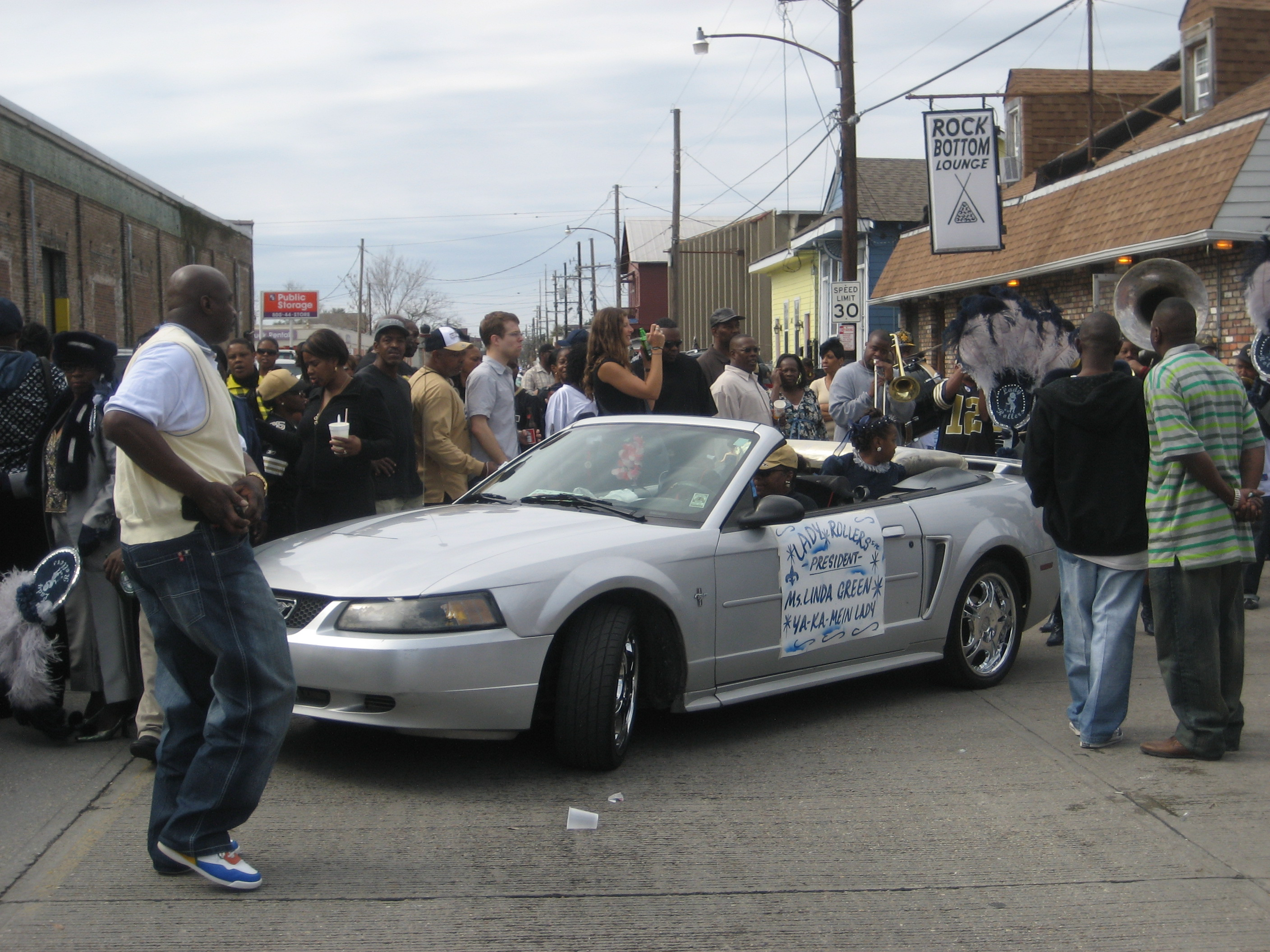
"Ya-Ka-Mein Lady" at second line in Uptown New Orleans, 2010

Yaka mein or yat gaw mein is a type of beef noodle soup found in many Creole restaurants in New Orleans, with variations throughout port cities and African-American communities in the coastal South and Mid-Atlantic. It is also a type of Chinese wheat noodle.

The soup consists of stewed beef (such as brisket) in beef-based broth served on top of noodles and garnished with half a hard-boiled egg and chopped green onions. Cajun or Creole seasoning and chili powder are often added to the broth.

== Culture and variations ==
Yaka mein is sometimes referred to as "Old Sober", as it is commonly prescribed by locals as a cure for hangovers. Vendors are common at New Orleans second lines, along with other settings including the New Orleans Jazz & Heritage Festival, alongside many other Creole and Cajun specialties. One of the major proponents of yaka mein since 2006 is Linda Green, who caters the dish at the Ogden Museum of Southern Art, JazzFest, Oak Street Po’Boy Fest, among other locations and cultural events in New Orleans. She also mentioned on her panel within the film, Far East Deep South, that Black slaves in her family were with Chinese slaves together where the Chinese taught her grandmother how to make the original dish. The soup is well loved by locals but not well known outside of the city and its surrounding region.

In New Orleans, there are variations of yaka mein that are heavily influenced by Vietnamese cuisine, utilizing more Vietnamese ingredients and cooking methods, due to New Orleans and Louisiana's large Vietnamese population, many of whom settled in African-American neighborhoods. These variations on yaka mein often bear a resemblance to pho, albeit with stronger flavors and different flavor palettes.

The dish is also found in Norfolk, Virginia; Baltimore, Maryland; and Philadelphia, Pittsburgh, and Bellevue, Pennsylvania carry-out restaurants. Some versions of yaka mein consist of thick wheat noodles (similar to udon) in a ketchup-based sauce or brown gravy, accompanied by thickly sliced onions, a hard-boiled egg, and fried noodles. Roast pork (char siu), chicken, and seafood can be added, with some restaurants including the option of pigs' feet. The Baltimore variation, colloquially called yat gaw mein or "dirty yak", utilizes shrimp, crayfish, or blue crab as the primary source of protein instead of beef brisket, due to the popularity of shellfish in Maryland; the noodles are udon and are served in a thicker, richer gravy than New Orleans yakamein. Chinese restaurants in both northwest and northeast Baltimore are known for their yat gaw mein, with a slight rivalry between the two areas in methods of serving and popularity.

In Norfolk and the surrounding Hampton Roads area, yaka mein is known as "box of yock" and served in takeout pails; this name is shared with the style of yaka mein in Cambridge, Maryland, on Maryland's Eastern Shore. Unlike the other variants, Cambridge-style yock likely lacks a connection to Chinese cuisine and immigration, being made with spaghetti noodles, tomato sauce, hot sauce, meat, onion, and a hard-boiled egg; the name likely derives from its relative similarity as a meat and noodle dish to the variants of yaka mein along other cities in the Mid-Atlantic and South.

== Etymology ==
One possible etymology for "yaka mein" is a Cantonese phrase meaning "one order of noodles" (一個麵; jat1 go3 min6), used by small restaurant waitstaffs to their kitchen to prepare an order of noodles. Numerous variant spellings exist.

== Origins ==
The origins of yaka mein are uncertain. Some sources say it was invented by Chinese immigrants brought to California during the mid-19th century to build the railroads between Houston and New Orleans and work in the sugar plantations of the American South. "Ya-Ca-Mein" is documented as being on the menu in New Orleans at least since 1945. It was during this period that the Chinese noodle soup adapted to local Creole and Chinese clientele.

The spread or convergent development of yaka mein in cities including Baltimore, Norfolk, and Philadelphia can be traced to either similar patterns of Chinese immigration, due to all cities where yaka mein is found being port cities that experienced early immigration from China, taking the recipe for yaka mein northwards during the Great Migration.

Regardless of its North American origins, by the 1920s yaka mein was already known in other parts of North America. In a 1927 article published in Maclean's magazine, the author indicated that "yet-ca mein" consisted of noodles or vermicelli boiled in rich stock, divided into individual bowls and garnished with sliced hard-boiled egg and sliced and chopped cooked meats. The author also indicated that other noodle dishes served in disparate fashions may also be collectively known as yet-ca mein.

In the movie Whipsaw, from 1935 starring Myrna Loy, a character in New Orleans places a phone order with a Chinese restaurant for, among other things, yaka mein. This mention supports the origin story cited by Leah Chase.

== Noodle type ==
Yaka mein is also referred to as a type of dried wheat Chinese noodles. In Canada Yet Ca Mein was introduced in the 1950s by Toronto-based Wing's Food Products and Montreal-based parent Wing Noodle Company (Wing Lung or Wing Hing Lung).

== See also ==
- List of regional dishes of the United States
