= Cordiner =

Cordiner is a surname, meaning "the cordwainer", which supposedly came from Cordova in Andalusia, Spain.

Notable people with the surname include:

- Ralph J. Cordiner (1900–1973), American businessman
- William Cordiner (1908–1962), Scottish footballer
