= Marvin Pipkin =

American chemist, engineer, scientist

- Pipkin showing his invention of the frosted soft white light bulbs
- Born: November 18, 1889; Lakeland, Florida
- Died: January 7, 1977 (aged 87); Lakeland, Florida
- Occupation: Chemist

Marvin Pipkin (November 18, 1889 – January 7, 1977) was an American chemist, engineer, and scientist. During his time in the United States Army, he worked on gas mask innovations. These masks were used by soldiers as well as the public during World War I for protection against chemical weapons. His innovative improvements were used through the twentieth century.

In his civilian life, Pipkin invented a process for frosting the inside of incandescent light bulbs to cut down on the sharp glare, and to diffuse the light. This process had the side effect of making a stronger constructed glass envelope that held up well with ordinary handling. He went on to make many other inventions and further improvements to the light bulb. His patents were developed into General Electric's popular Soft-White bulb series that were mass-produced. He also had patents for the photo flash bulb.

== Biography ==
The fourth of six children, Pipkin was born November 18, 1889, south of Lakeland, Florida in a suburban community called Christina. His parents were Daniel M. Pipkin and Sarah Catherine (Moore) Pipkin. His father owned a citrus grove and was a farmer. Pipkin attended Lakeland elementary school and graduated from Bartow High School in Bartow, Florida.

Pipkin's first job was at a prospecting firm, where he worked for a year. Following that, he worked for about a year at International Mineral and Chemical Corporation of Bartow, where he was surrounded by college-educated people. Pipkin decided that he had to attend college in order to expand the ideas he had on certain chemistry theories. He attended Auburn University, at that time known as Alabama Polytechnic Institute, graduating with a degree in chemical engineering in 1913. Pipkin then worked for a year in a fertilizer laboratory, after which he returned to API, where he gained his master's degree in 1915. He then attended Case Western Reserve University in Cleveland, where he graduated with a doctorate in chemistry.

Pipkin enlisted in the Army in Jacksonville, Florida, on November 5, 1917. Because the Germans were using gas as a chemical weapon during World War I, gas mask research had a high priority. With his chemistry background, Pipkin was posted to the Army's Gas Defense Department at General Electric's Nela Park in Cleveland. He was promoted to the rank of a senior grade master engineer. The principles embodied in the gas mask innovations he created while there remained in use throughout the twentieth century. Pipkin remained at Nela Park as a research scientist after the war. He worked in General Electric's light bulb development department.

Pipkin retired from the General Electric Nela Park laboratory in November 1954. He settled at his home on Beacon Road in Lakeland, Florida. He had lived in the town most of his life. Pipkin died of cancer at the General Hospital in Lakeland on January 7, 1977, at the age of 87. He is buried at the Fitzgerald Cemetery in Lakeland.

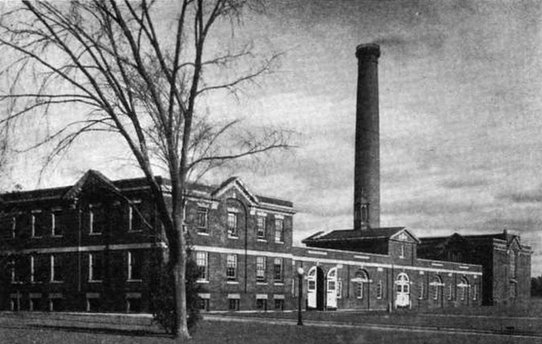
Nela Operating Building factory, c. 1920

== Light bulb innovations ==
Clear transparent incandescent lamps give off a sharp light, which is unpleasant to many people, and also makes it hard to see objects close to the lamp. In 1920, General Electric developed a 30 watt light bulb that had outside etching as a frosting effect. It effectively diffused the light to make it softer; however, it decreased the light produced by 15–25 percent. Another problem with the lamp was that fluorides used in the etching attacked the tungsten filament, and that external etching of the globe bulb weakened it. The rough outside surface collected dust and dirt and was difficult to clean. The etched bulbs were brittle and would often break with ordinary handling.

At General Electric, Pipkin produced an innovative acid etching process for the inside of the globe of an electric lamp so that it did not deteriorate the lamp glass globe. His was a two step acid process that etched the interior of glass with tiny crevasses on the first process like in the normal procedure, but he added a second acid step that caused soft, rounded dimples from the crevasses which gave the bulbs added strength. There was minimal loss of diffusion of light with his innovation. It left the outside of the globe of the glass lamp smooth so that it did not hold dust like those etched on the outside. The first electric light bulb frosted on the inside with sufficient strength for ordinary handling that could be sold to the public was invented by Pipkin in 1925. Patent No. 1,687,510 was issued to Pipkin on October 16, 1928, and by him assigned to his employer, General Electric Co. On November 5, 1945, however, the United States Supreme Court invalidated the patent, on the ground that the claimed invention was not sufficiently original.

This idea of having a second treatment to smooth out the fine-grained texture to dimples came about by accident. Pipkin would often clean out the experimental bulbs with another solution of the acid, but in a weaker solution. If he left the filled bulb for a while with this weaker solution it would clean out the etching previously done and return the glass globe to its transparent state. This made it possible to repeat an etching experiment on the following day. One day, while he was pouring the weaker solution into a bulb, the phone rang. In the process of answering the phone, he accidentally tipped the bulb over before it had enough time to finish cleaning out the previous etching. When he returned to his work, he accidentally knocked the glass bulb off the workbench and onto the floor. To his surprise it did not shatter, as etched bulbs normally did, but bounced a few times and then rolled under the workbench. Pipkin was surprised to find that the bulb glass had somehow become much stronger. As it turned out, a short bath in the weaker cleaning solution, not long enough to remove the etching, caused the etching of the first frosting treatment to form dimples in the etching, that strengthened the glass.

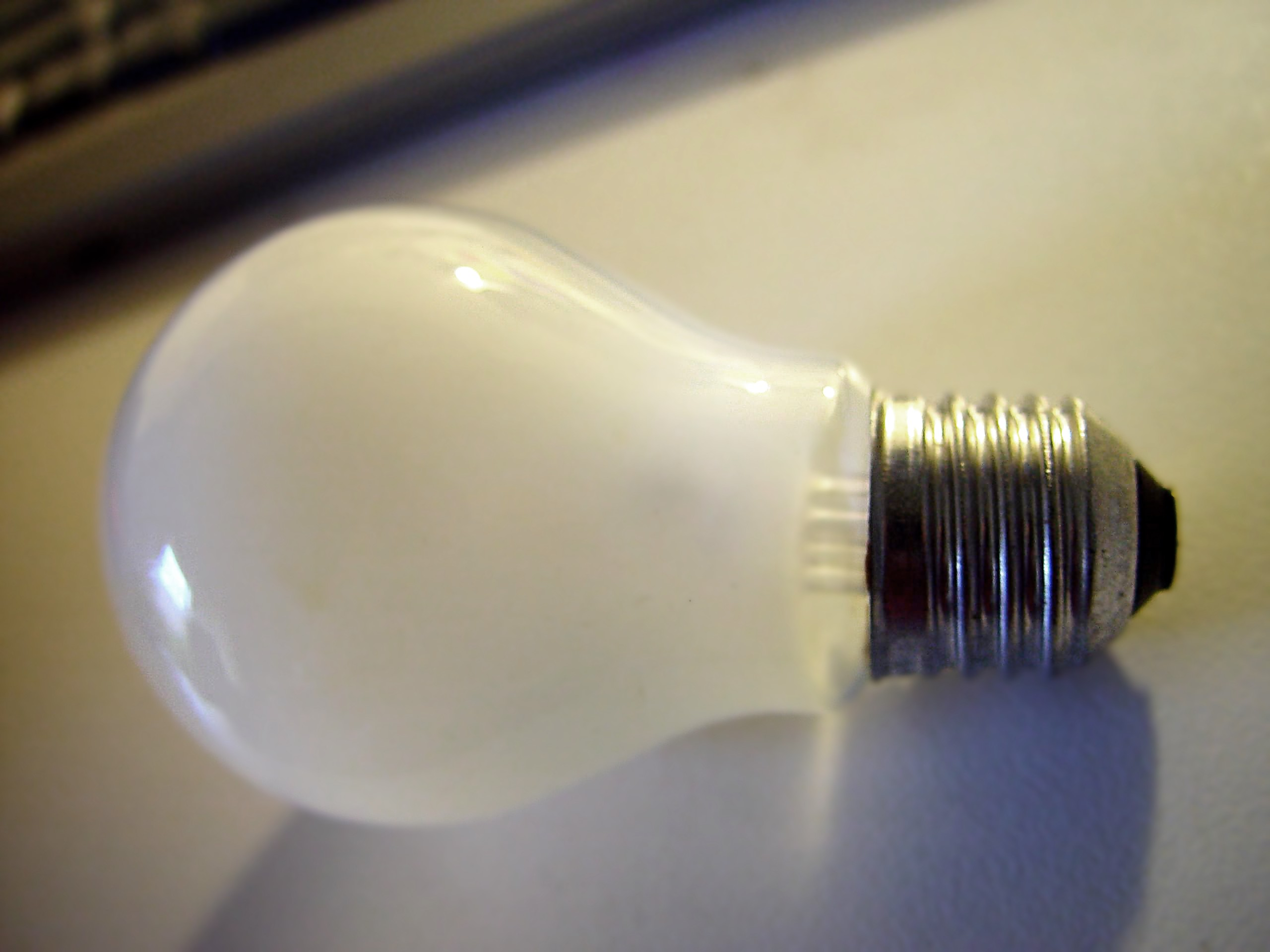
Deluxe Soft-White frosted bulb

Pipkin did a demonstration of the bulbs' integrity to his supervisor at General Electric. He presented to his supervisor six light bulbs that had been frosted on the inside. Some had just the one application of acid and others with his reinforced second treatment. He placed the bulbs on his supervisor's desk, standing up on their screw bottoms. He tipped the first three over, one at a time, to simulate a bulb being dropped from a small height. These were the bulbs treated with original single acid application, and as expected, all three bulbs shattered. He then tipped over the remaining three bulbs, which were tempered with his new two-step acid treatment. They remained unbroken, much to the surprise of his supervisor. Then, to further demonstrate the effectiveness of his tempering process, Pipkin took bulbs that had not shattered and dropped them again, this time allowing them to fall to the office floor. The bulbs bounced on the floor, and settled without breaking. Pipkin's new frosted bulb revolutionized the industry, allowing the manufacture of frosted bulbs that diffused the light without losing much intensity, and were strong enough to be commercially viable. He went on to make many innovations to the light bulb and two decades later developed the soft white light bulb.

Pipkin in 1947 invented an improved version of the process with silica coating that replaced the internal acid etching process. The 1947 internal silica coating was used for 30 years and had the trade name "Q coat". Pipkin is also credited with perfecting the photo flash bulb with several patents. Besides the frosted light bulb, Pipkin invented or improved many other products during his career with General Electric. One was for a toy light that could be used on a child's toy train or toy car. Pipkin's innovations were noted in articles in Time, Newsweek, and the Saturday Evening Post magazines, as well as in scientific journals.

== Personal life ==
Pipkin married Kathryn Patricia Enright (1896–1957) on July 21, 1919; they had three daughters. He spoke with a pronounced southern accent. Pipkin was a member of Tuscan Masonic Lodge, Knights of Pythias, and the American Chemical Society. He was awarded the Charles A. Coffin award for his achievements in electric lamp improvements.

== Sources ==
- Bonnier Corp (March 1949). "Popular Science". The Popular Science Monthly. Bonnier Corporation. ISSN 0161-7370.
- Cox, James A. (1979). Century of Light. Benjamin Company, Inc. ISBN 978-0-87502-062-4.
- Encyclopedia Americana (1955). The Encyclopedia Americana. Americana Corporation. OCLC 1049853396.
- Federal Cases (1937). Federal Supplement Cases. West Publishing Company.
- GE Cleveland (1920). Nation in World War. Gilman printing Company. OCLC 1166492576.
- Hendrickson III, Kenneth E. (2014). Encyclopedia Industrial Revolution. Rowman & Littlefield Publishers. ISBN 978-0-8108-8888-3.
- Kane, Joseph Nathan (1964). Famous First Facts. H.W. Wilson. OCLC 636881840.
- Keating, Paul W. (1954). Lamps for Brighter America. McGraw-Hill. OCLC 1083003507.
- Lynn, Thomas (1973). 150 Biographical Illustrations. OCLC 7609051.
- Ohio Engineer (1951). Ohio State Engineer. Ohio State University.
- Payne, Kenneth Wilcox (August 1927). "Popular Science". The Popular Science Monthly. Bonnier Corporation. ISSN 0161-7370.
