= T.K. Quinn =

American businessman

Theodore Kinget Quinn (1893–1961) was an American executive who became Vice President of General Electric after increasing the company's refrigerator market share and whilst it was thought that he may eventually lead the company, he left and became the President of Maxon advertising agency, commencing his role in 1936.

During World War II, Quinn was a Director at the War Production Board, where his focus was on labor relations and improving productivity. After the war he established a small appliance business, Monitor Equipment Corporation, with an ex-colleague from General Electric. He became an author known for writing critically of big business. During his life he provided testimony to government committees, where he criticized large corporations and recommended that the government introduce legislation to limit the size of corporations.

== Early life ==
Quinn's father, Timothy Patrick Quinn was from Rathkeale, Ireland. In 1883, he immigrated to the United States and worked as a union leader in New York and later in Chicago. Quinn was born in New York on 11 June 1893. The New Republic described Quinn as being "self educated".

== Career ==
=== General Electric and Maxon ===
Quinn began his career at General Electric working in the factory. He became the manager of the refrigerator department, and whilst working on General Electric's first refrigerator, he correctly predicted that to compete successfully with Kelvinator and Frigidaire, the business would need to sell 50,000 refrigerators to achieve a competitive cost per unit. The Monitor Top refrigerator launched in the 1920s and by 1930 General Electric had a 34.1% market share of the refrigeration market.

Quinn was elected as Vice President of General Electric in 1930, responsible for the refrigerator division in addition to becoming Chairman of the appliance sales committee. Later sources suggested that he was Chairman of the board or Chief Executive of the General Electric Finance Company. Despite being tipped as having the potential to become a successive President, his departure from the company was announced in November 1935 after he resigned. He had worked for General Electric for over two decades, and he left to join an advertising agency called Maxon, commencing his new role in January 1936, and assuming the role of President until 1942.

=== War Production Board ===
During World War II, between 1943 and 1944, Quinn worked as General Director for the War Production Board and was paid US$1 per year, where he established labor management committees in factories producing goods for the war effort that were tasked with improving productivity. Awards were given in recognition of suggestions that increased productivity. He also funded the publication of a guide, The Labor and Management Committee Manual, that focused on team building, employee relations and suggested ways that productivity and working conditions could be improved, and encouraged businesses to give employees more say in decision making.

=== Monitor Equipment Corporation ===
By 1945, Quinn had established the Monitor Equipment Corporation in the Bronx, with an ex-colleague from General Electric, Paul B. Zimmerman, where he made agreements with small appliance manufacturers to sell their goods, such as refrigerators, freezers, washing and sewing machines, that would be Monitor branded and sold via distributors who would own a stake in Monitor Equipment Corporation. During this time he criticized the Office of Price Administration, for their cost absorption policy, due to the impact it would have on distributors, arguing that this policy helped manufacturers but did little to assist small businesses in distribution and retail.

=== Author ===
Quinn published his first book in 1943, Liberty, employment and no more wars, which was described as being "a personal survey of background, current and future conditions in industry, government, employment, economics, competition, social responsibility, etc." In his 1953 book, Giant Business, he described why he exited General Electric despite assumptions he would become President, was critical of the company and large corporations, suggesting they mistreated distributors and employees, and claimed they lacked social responsibility. He also criticized what he perceived as a lack of innovation and the reliance on acquiring smaller firms, and supported government anti-trust and anti-monopoly intervention. His final book, which again criticized big business and monopolistic business practices such as price fixing, titled Unconscious Public Enemies, was published in 1962 shortly after his death.

=== Government committee testimony ===
Quinn provided his views to the Joint Congressional Committee in early 1955, that was studying President Eisenhower's Economic Report and considering limiting the number of markets corporations could be active in, where he was described as being "The most outspoken critic of the large corporations" and where he raised concerns about the concentration of wealth and market share held by a relatively small number of corporations.

In November 1955, Quinn travelled to Washington and provided testimony to Senators involved in the Senate Antitrust and Monopoly Subcommittee, who were studying General Motors after concerns being raised about how the company was treating some stakeholders. He claimed that the corporation had become too large and that this was a threat to smaller enterprises and urged Senators to limit the size of corporations.

== Death ==
Quinn died in August 1961, at the age of 68. The reported cause of death was a heart attack, and he left two children (a boy and girl) and five grandchildren. One source reported his age at the time of his death as being 67.

== Characterization ==
In New York, Quinn lived near playwright Arthur Miller, who wrote The American Clock. The character Theodore K. Quinn in the play was inspired by Quinn.

== Books ==
- Unconscious Public Enemies (Citadel Press, 1962)
- Giant corporations: challenge to freedom; the American economic revolution (Exposition Press, 1956)
- Giant business: threat to democracy; the autobiography of an insider (Exposition Press, 1953)
- I Quit Monster Business (Public Relations Inc., 1948)
- Liberty, employment, and no more wars (Hastings House, 1943)
