= Homer Oldfield =

American computer specialist

Homer Ray Oldfield Jr. (August 28, 1916 – June 22, 2000), also known as Barney Oldfield, was an American computer professional best known for his work for General Electric in the 1940s and 50s.

Oldfield was born in Mount Vernon, New York on August 28, 1916. He attended the Massachusetts Institute of Technology, where he received a BS in Aeronautical Engineering in 1938, and an MS in Instrumentation in 1939.

From 1939 to 1941 he worked as a research associate at the MIT Instrument Laboratory. In 1941 he joined the US Army where he worked on microwave antiaircraft radar. He was a soldier in WWII in the Pacific Theater, and in 1945 he joined General Electric as a sales manager. From 1950 to 1952 he was operations manager of the GE Advanced Electronics Center at Cornell University, where he also served as visiting professor. From 1952 to 1955 he directed the GE Microwave Laboratory at Stanford University. At Stanford he participated in development of an early computer system, Electronic Recording Machine, Accounting (ERMA), developed by SRI International for Bank of America in the 1950s. This system was manufactured by General Electric, and sold as the GE-100.

In 1956, Oldfield was promoted to General Manager of GE's Computer Department in Phoenix, Arizona. In Phoenix he attempted to push GE further into the computer business, in the face of opposition from higher management. He became the general manager and founder of GE's computer department, in which he facilitated the invention and the construction of the Bank of America ERMA system, the first computerized system designed to read magnetized numbers on checks. He was fired from GE in 1958 by Ralph J. Cordiner for overstepping his bounds and successfully gaining the ERMA contract. Cordiner was strongly against GE entering the computer business because he did not see the potential in it. As fellow computer pioneer Arnold Spielberg, who was hired by Oldfield to set up the GE Industrial Computer Department, described to historian Anne Frantilla, "By the time Cordiner found out what the team was doing, it was too late. They already had Bank of America as a customer. 'He came out to attend the dedication ceremonies and promptly fired Barney Oldfield right after the ceremony for violating his rules... He gave the company 18 months to get out of the business.”

Under Oldfield's management, GE established ties with Arizona State College (now Arizona State University) in the Phoenix area to open a new Technology Center for computer development and research. Oldfield had worked on similar centers at Cornell and Stanford Universities, the first centers in the country to partner developing high tech with cutting edge university research. Oldfield established GE's partnership with the help of ASC Chairman of the Board of Trustees John Jacobs, rancher and pioneer in Arizona development. Influencing the opening of the ASC Computer Department in a new College of Engineering, Oldfield had a role in bringing high tech to the area and influencing the further development of the city of Phoenix.

After GE Oldfield went on to positions at Raytheon, DASA Corporation, Searle Medidata, and Medidata Health Services, of which he was part owner. Oldfield was president of Searle Medidata. He was a Fellow of the Institute of Radio Engineers, a fellow of the International Health Evaluation Association, and a member of the American Medical Informatics Association. In 1997 he received the Computer Pioneer Award from the IEEE "For pioneering work in the development of banking applications through the implementation of ERMA, and the introduction of computer manufacturing to GE."

In 1996 Oldfield published a book, King of the Seven Dwarfs: General Electric's ambiguous challenge to the computer industry, about his experiences at GE.

Oldfield died in Bradenton, Florida on June 22, 2000, at the age of 83.
