= We Bring Good Things to Life =

Advertising slogan of General Electric

"We Bring Good Things to Life" was an advertising slogan used by General Electric between 1979 and 2003. It was designed by the advertising firm BBDO led by project manager Richard Costello, who would later go on to become head of advertising at General Electric. The slogan was designed to highlight the diversity of the products and services the company offered. The slogan, after its many appearances in GE advertising, was responsible for increased popularity and a new image for the company. General Electrics pushed out this marketing campaign spending a billion dollars in adverting. The "We Bring Good Things to Life" slogan focused mainly on General Electric's appliances and lighting fixtures.

In 2001 Jack Welch retired with GE with its worth at 505 billion dollars and was replaced by Jefferey Immelt as chief executive director, who in January 2003 changed the slogan to "Imagination at Work", ending the "We Bring Good Things to Life" campaign.

== Historical context ==
General Electric was created in 1892 when Thomas Edison's Edison Electric Company merged with Thomson-Houston. GE was heavily involved in the electrification of railways in the late 1880s and by the turn of the century was manufacturing everything related to electrification from industrial electric motors to light bulbs and locomotives. In 1896, GE and the Westinghouse Company entered into a patent pool, effectively eliminating competition in the electrification industry in an era when the United States was entering the electric age.

From its beginnings, GE emphasized research to create many products and product improvements. The company has been awarded more patents than almost any other company in the United States. GE began creating consumer products in the early 20th century, beginning with a line of toasters. After GE merged with other companies, more and more consumer appliances such as irons and refrigerators began to be sold under the GE or Hotpoint brand names.

During World War Two most appliance manufactures were tasked with making parts for war rather than mass producing their products. As consumers saved money, companies such as GE worked on advertising campaigns promoting how money should be spent after war. General Electric's advertising campaign focused on the furnishing of new suburban homes. In 1952 General Electric's president Ralph Cordiner introduced marketing as the first step in their business model. GE began researching the market on what a customer wants in a product and what they are willing to pay, as well as marketing who the product is for.

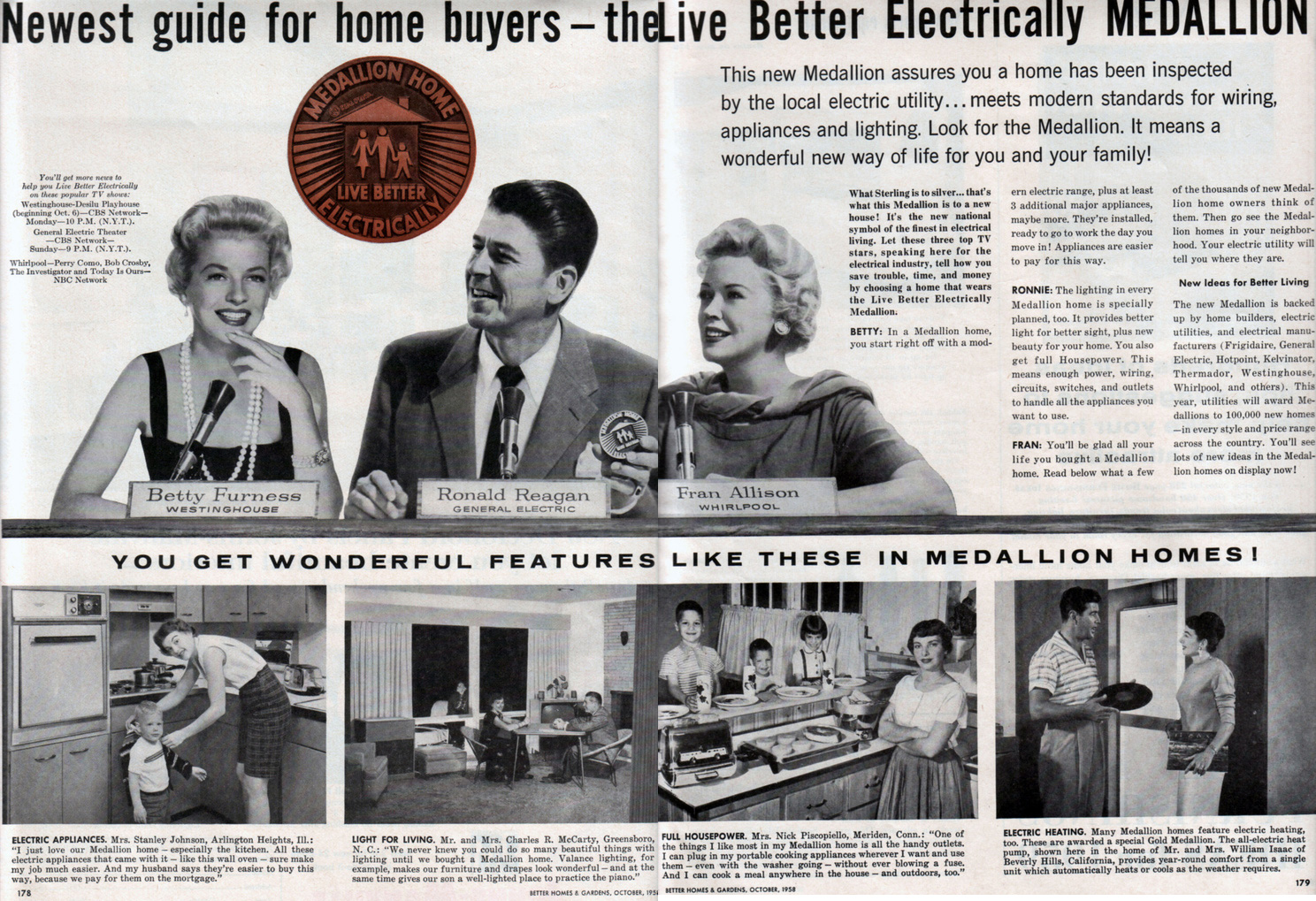
1958 GE advertisement featured in Better Homes and Gardens with actor Ronald Reagan. The token was given to all electric homeowners.

In 1954, future President Ronald Reagan and General Electric came together to create "The General Electric Television Theater", the show ran on CBS until 1962. In the post-World War two era General Electric and then actor/ political figure Ronald Reagan worked together to promote mass consumption of goods produced by GE. The postwar ideal of mass consumption promoted a democratic citizen-consumer who used their buying power to create a republic of consumption to power the nation.

A citizen-consumer is a member of society who uses their power as a buyer to influence political change. In Lizabeth Cohen's book A Consumers' Republic: The politics of Mass consumption in Postwar America she coins this term as the interaction between consumers and how they use consumption to influence the economy, politics, and society to make our country a better place. The Consumers' Republic of post-war society went into retreat in the 1970s. The ideals of the citizen consumer shifted advertisements through the 20th century.

By the 1970s, GE had shifted once again to a focus to the service and high-tech fields. In this increasingly diversified market, the company saw that a more comprehensive advertising strategy was needed. Prior to 1979, GE's image was primarily that of an appliance company. Each one of the company's products and services used its own advertising theme, not an overall company slogan. To remedy the situation, the advertising agency BBDO began to develop the “We Bring Good Things to Life” campaign to create a unified brand image.

A far more likely source of the campaign idea may come more directly from the words of one of General Electric's most famous employees Charles Proteus Steinmetz (1865–1923) who is quoted as saying of his work: "Some day we make the good things of life for everybody."

== Past slogans ==
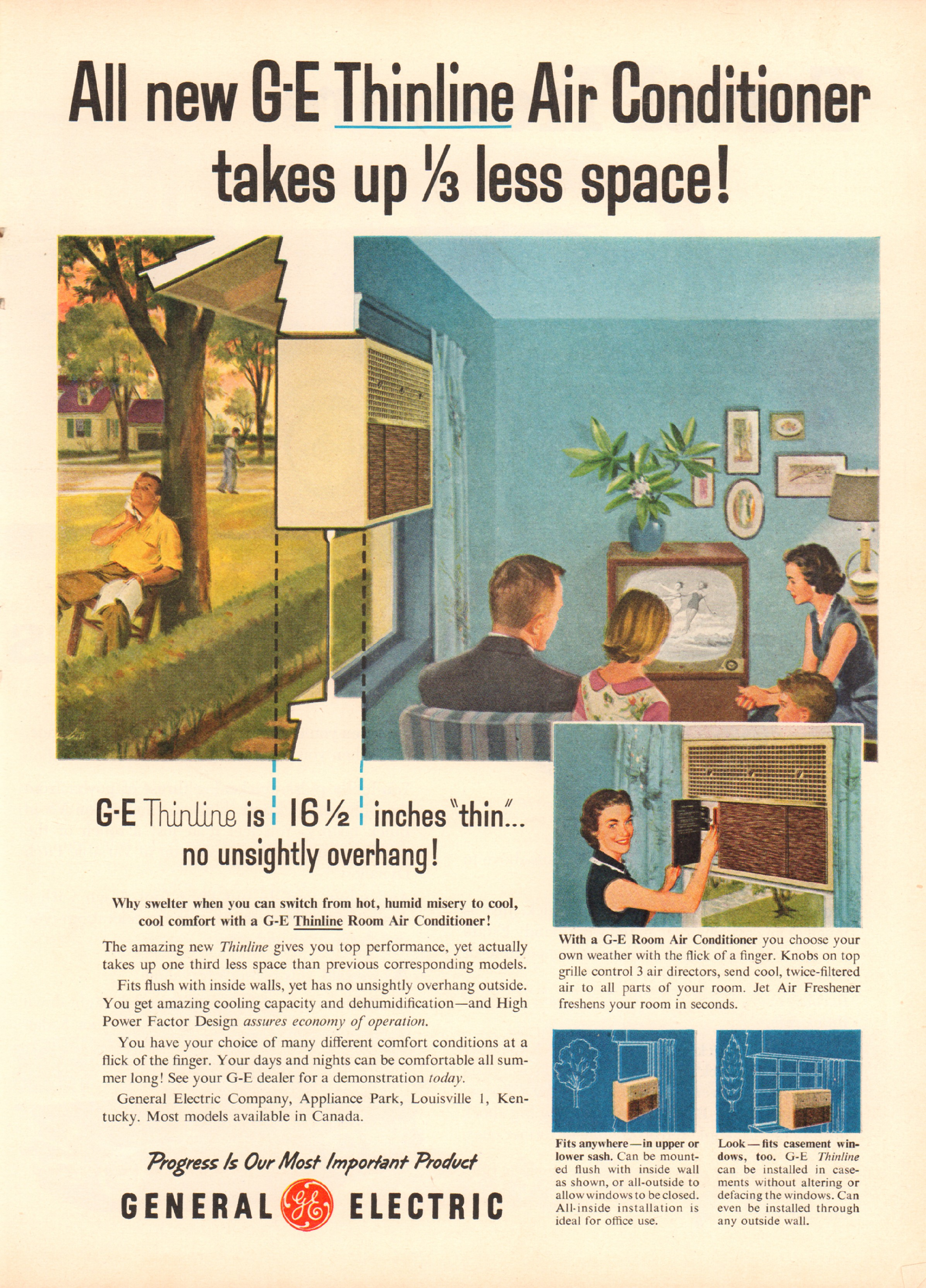
A 1956 GE advertisement in Times magazine promoting their new "Thinline" AC unit

General Electric's slogans have changed many times throughout the company's history. "Live Better Electrically" was the company's lead advertising campaign from the 1930s to 1950s. In the period from 1950 to the "We Bring good Things to Life" campaign of 1979, GE experimented with multiple campaigns surrounding the word progress. The most known being "Progress is our Most Important Product." In the time following World War II this campaign fit the American Ideal of reconvergence.

== Target market ==
Market research done by BBDO showed that in the 1970s, GE was still seen as a dependable and trusted American company, but a typical GE customer was perceived to be older, low-income, blue-collar, and unsophisticated, and GE products to be somewhat old fashioned and below standard. As a result, except in the area of lighting products, brand commitment to GE lagged behind its competitors. GE saw the need to change the company's brand recognition and to create an updated, single message that could translate across many product lines and services. GE's stated objective for the new campaign was to increase customer awareness of GE products and to foster more product loyalty. Additionally, GE sought to increase employee morale and heighten its image in the financial world, in government, in the retail business sector, and in public consciousness. GE also tried to stimulate a more upscale consumer base, made up of adults between the ages of 25 and 54. The new campaign was more appropriate to the information age, in which consumers were constantly bombarded with advertising images from a variety of media.

== Marketing strategy ==
When GE advertising was consolidated in 1979 with BBDO, the "Good Things" slogan was not only incorporated into media ads but also induced on all packaging, spec sheets and brochures, and service trucks. When GE sponsored a television program, the ad agency used a number of "We Bring Good Things to Life" commercials, each telling the GE story in a different way. Aside from promoting products and services, GE commercials and print ads began to project a new corporate image, stressing how the company's products and services had enhanced people's lives. Since GE had previously been identified with consumer products, this shift in emphasis was significant. The advertising budget on this campaign was approximately $100 million.

For a company such as General Electric there is a lot of decision making that goes into the production of a new product. Gamma change is when an item drastically shifts how people live their life. Gamma change is most often achieved by technological companies. Some GE inventions that committed gamma change are the incandescent lightbulb in 1879, electric home appliances in 1910, and the first home television in 1927. General Electric's products have changed the way we live our lives. In the Jack Welch and "We Bring Good Things to Life" era from 1981- 2003 General Electric continued their dominance at the forefront of technological advancement. Welch became the youngest CEO in GE history in 1981. In his tenure Jack Welch increased the company's performance expectation and created a model of competition against other brands. He purchased numerous companies such as the RCA Corporation and combined GE's British business interests with General Electric.

== Outcome ==
"We Bring Good Things to Life" was extremely successful and became the longest running corporate advertising campaign. It did not take long for consumers to see GE as more than a producer of electrical household products. By the early 1990s, GE was among the most recognized brands in the United States along with Coca-Cola and IBM. According to research by BBDO, consumers were also beginning to see GE as a more competitive, energetic, and approachable company than ever before, and the consumer base was becoming younger and more affluent. The company also ranked high in customer satisfaction after the release of this advertising campaign.
