= Nela Park =

- U.S. National Register of Historic Places
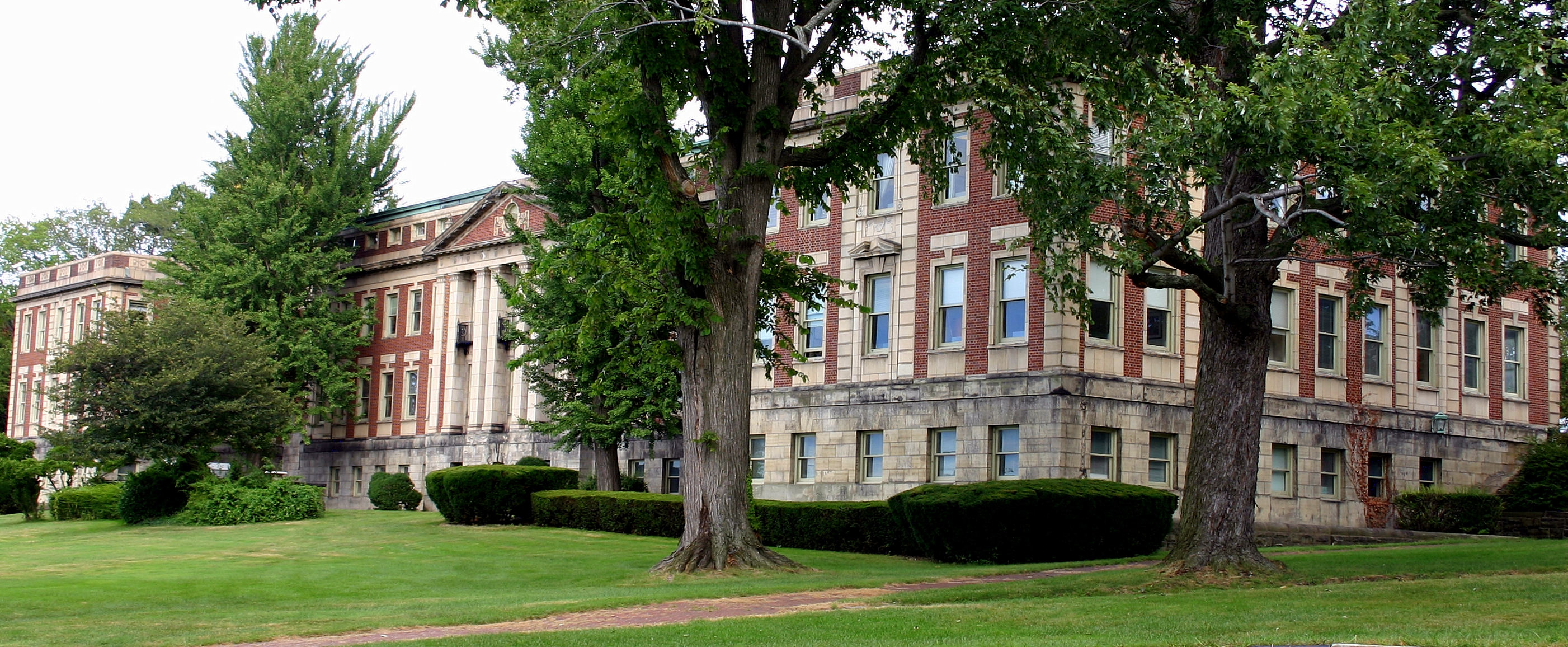
- Nela Park, Building 307

- Location within Ohio Location within the United States
- Location: Entrance at 1975 Noble Rd., East Cleveland, Ohio 44112
- Coordinates: 41°32′28″N 81°33′39″W
- Built: 1911-1924
- Architect: Frank E, Wallis
- NRHP reference No.: 75001365
- Added to NRHP: 1975

Nela Park is the headquarters of GE Lighting, a Savant company, and is located in East Cleveland, Ohio, United States. Nela Park is the first industrial park in the world, and was the site of most of the lighting breakthroughs of the last century.

The institute was first organized by entrepreneurs Franklin Terry and Burton Tremaine of the National Electric Lamp Company. Development of the site was started in 1911 when the National Electric Lamp Association (NELA), formed by John Robert Crouse Sr, J.B. Crouse, and H.A. Tremaine in 1901, was dissolved and absorbed into General Electric. It was the first industrial park in the world, and was added to the National Register of Historic Places in 1975. The campus emulates a university setting, and the dominant architectural style is Georgian Revival. The 92-acre (370,000 m^{2}) campus is home to GE's Lighting & Electrical Institute, which was founded in 1933. Each December, Nela Park features a world-famous Christmas lighting display, which culminates in a miniature version of the National Christmas Tree in Washington, D.C., designed by GE Lighting.

During World War I, the Chemical Corps had a research station at Nela.

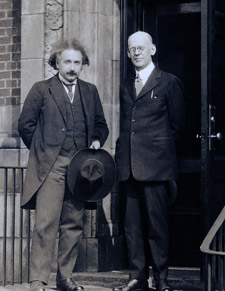
In 1921, Albert Einstein visits Nela Park with Ernest Fox Nichols.

== Ownership ==
In March 2022, GE Lighting sold Nela Park to an affiliate of Phoenix Investors, a Milwaukee-based real estate firm. Phoenix Investors put it up for sale in 2026.

== See also ==
- Marvin Pipkin – A scientist engineer that had many inventions and innovations for the light bulb and worked at Nela Park
