= GE Lighting =

Lighting brand

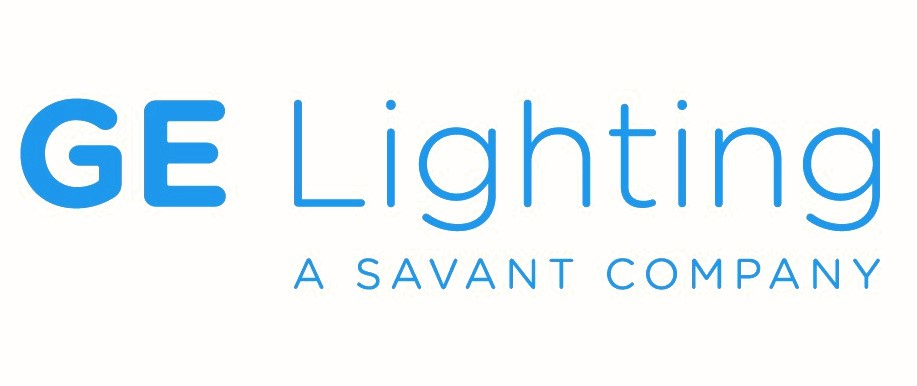
- Industry: Electric lighting
- Predecessor: National Electric Lamp Company / National Electric Light Association; GE Edison lamp division
- Founded: 1911
- Headquarters: East Cleveland, Ohio, USA
- Revenue: ~$3 billion (2011)
- Number of employees: ≈700 (2020)
- Parent: General Electric (1911–2020); Savant Systems (2020–present)
- Website: www.gelighting.com

GE Lighting is a division of Savant Systems Inc. headquartered in Nela Park, East Cleveland, Ohio, United States. The company traces its origins to Thomas Edison's work on lighting in the 19th century.

== History ==
In 1911, General Electric was found to have acquired three quarters of the National Electric Light Association, an association of lighting product companies through which GE had licensed its patented products; this trading arrangement was the subject of an antitrust investigation, and as a result the association was dissolved. GE subsequently acquired several of the association's member companies. These were later consolidated with the Edison lamp division.

In July 2011, GE Lighting entered a licensing agreement with Nuventix for its LED cooling technology and invested $10 million into the company. Two weeks later, the company announced its plans to buy Lightech, acquiring its LED and halogen power supplies, for a deal reportedly worth between $15 million and $20 million. On October 7, 2015, the Commercial division of GE Lighting was separated from the business and a new startup, Current, was created.

On July 1, 2020, GE Lighting was acquired by Savant Systems, a home automation company headquartered in Hyannis, Massachusetts, United States. This was General Electric's last consumer business. Neither company disclosed the price but the Wall Street Journal reported that it was $250 million.

== See also ==
- Chicago Lighting Institute
