= The American Clock =

Play written by Arthur Miller

Playbill cover from the 1980 Broadway production

The American Clock is a play by Arthur Miller. The play is about 1930s America during The Great Depression. It is based in part on Studs Terkel's Hard Times: An Oral History of the Great Depression.

== Plot ==
The Baum family—father Moe, mother Rose and son Lee are trying to cope during the Great Depression of the 1930s. They were wealthy but lost their money during the Depression. They are forced to move from their home in Manhattan to live with relatives in Brooklyn. Lee wants to be a writer (and narrates the play).

=== Characters ===
- Theodore K. Quinn (inspired by Millers neighbour, the business executive T.K. Quinn)
- Lee Baum
- Rose Baum (Lee's Mother)
- Arthur A. Robertson
- Clarence, a shoeshine man
- Fanny Margolies (Rose's Sister)
- Sidney Margolies (Fanny's son)
- Lucille (Fanny's daughter)
- Grandpa (Rose's Father)
- Frank (The Baums' Chauffeur)
- Dr. Rossman
- Jesse Livermore
- William Durant
- Arthur Clayton
- Tony (Speakeasy Owner)
- Diana Morgan
- Henry Taylor (A Farmer)
- Irene
- Banks, a black veteran
- Judge Bradley
- Sheriff
- Isaac
- Moe Baum (Lee's Father)
- Brewster
- Doris Gross (Sidney's wife)
- Stanislaus

== Productions ==
The play premiered at the Spoleto Festival U.S.A., Charleston, South Carolina in May 1980.

The play premiered on Broadway at the Biltmore Theatre on November 11, 1980 and closed on November 30, 1980 after 12 performances and 11 previews. The director was Vivian Matalon, with the cast that featured Miller's younger sister, Joan Copeland, who won a Drama Desk Award for Outstanding Actress in a Play for her portrayal of Rose Baum. William Atherton portrayed Lee Baum and John Randolph played Moe Baum.

The play was presented by the Royal National Theatre in London in August 1986 at the Cottesloe Theatre, and then transferred to the Olivier Theatre in December 1986. Directed by Peter Wood, the cast featured Michael Bryant as Moe Baum, Sara Kestelman as Rose Baum and Neil Daglish as Lee Baum. This version of the play had been revised from the original Broadway production and included "a jazz band, songs from the 30s, and a music hall spotlight." In the production Rose sits at the piano as the band plays. The play was nominated for the 1986 Olivier Award, BBC Award for the Play of the Year, and Peter Wood was nominated for Director of the Year.

The play was produced at the Williamstown Theater Festival (Williamstown, Massachusetts), directed by Austin Pendleton in July 1988.

The play was presented Off-Broadway by the Signature Theatre Company in October 1997. The cast featured Laura Esterman as Rose, Lewis J. Stadlen as Moe and Jason Fisher as Lee. This version of the play had "twenty-eight well-known American songs", including those written by Irving Berlin, Jerome Kern George and Ira Gershwin, which were performed by four musicians.

In March 2012 director Phil Willmott revived the show at the Finborough Theatre in London. Issy van Randwyck starred.

Miller "attributes the Broadway failure of American Clock to several factors, including a misguided staging of the play and his own capitulation to pressures to rewrite the material in ways that conformed to conventional expectations but robbed the work of its true voice."

The play was produced at The Old Vic, London in 2019, directed by Rachel Chavkin. The production again included a jazz band on stage, and several song & dance routines, mainly in the first half. However its unique feature was that the three members of the Baum family were each played by three different actors, one family cast as white, the second as probably of South Asian origin and the third as Afro Americans. The three sets of actors appeared at various points in the narrative, often on the stage together. Critical reaction was mixed, with most liking the unique casting, whilst agreeing that the fairly weak plot makes this one of Miller’s weaker plays.

== Critical response ==
Frank Rich wrote: "It is Mr. Miller's notion, potentially a great one, that the Baums' story can help tell the story of America itself during the traumatic era that gave birth to our own. As it happens, neither tale is told well in The American Clock: indeed, the Baums and history fight each other to a standoff."
