= GE/PAC 4000 =

Computers manufactured by General Electric

The GE/PAC 4000 computer systems are an obsolete line of computers manufactured by General Electric in Phoenix, Arizona beginning in the 1960s. PAC is short for Process Automation Computer, indicating the intended use of the systems for process control.

All 4000 systems are 24-bit, using fixed-point binary data, with between 1020 and 65,536 words of magnetic core memory, and a magnetic drum memory with 8192 to 262,144 word capacity. The CPU logic is implemented with discrete transistors. The systems can be configured with a wide variety of analog and digital inputs and outputs.

The 4020 is the low-end model of the system. Three models of the 4000, the 4040, 4050, and 4060 differ in storage speed— 5μsec, 3.4μsec, and 1.7 and 2.38μsec respectively— and by the implementation of a serial arithmetic unit on the 4040 vs. parallel on the other systems,

== Software ==
The operating system for the 4000 series is called "G-E-MONITOR", a "skeleton real-time system program." "Several versions of MONITOR are available, each tailored to the needs of a specific industry or process." Other software included Process Assembler Language (PAL), FORTRAN II, and Tabular Sequence Control (TASC). A set of memory load, dump, and change routines was provided.

== Applications ==
A product brochure highlighted potential uses in the utility industry, food processing, manufacturing, the metal and chemical industry, paper and cement manufacturing, and petroleum.
