= Ralph J. Cordiner =

American businessman (1900–1973)

- Born: Ralph Jarron Cordiner; March 20, 1900; Walla Walla, Washington, U.S.
- Died: December 5, 1973 (aged 73); Belleair, Florida, U.S.
- Education: Whitman College
- Occupations: Chairman & CEO of General Electric (1958-1963)

Ralph Jarron Cordiner (March 20, 1900 – December 5, 1973) was an American businessman. He was president of General Electric from 1950 to 1958, and as its chairman and chief executive officer from 1958 to 1963.

== Biography ==
He was born in 1900 on a 1280-acre wheat farm in Walla Walla, Washington. He attended Whitman College, working odd jobs and selling washing machines, and graduated in 1922 with a Bachelor of Science in economics. Upon graduation, he became a salesman at Pacific Power & Light Company.

He joined the Edison General Electric Appliance Company, a GE affiliate, in 1923. Later, he became manager of its Northwest and Ocean Pacific divisions. From 1932 to 1938, he worked in its Bridgeport, Connecticut office. In 1939, he left GE and was president of Schick until 1942. He returned to GE and worked as Charles E. Wilson's assistant. In 1950, he became president of GE, up until 1958. From 1958 to 1963, he was chairman and CEO. During his tenure, he decentralized GE into 120 units.

In 1958 Cordiner fired Homer Oldfield as General Manager (from 1956) of GE's Computer Department for exceeding his authority by developing the Bank of America ERMA system, because he did not see any potential in the computer business.

He was chairman of the Defense Advisory Committee on Professional and Technical Compensation in the Armed Forces. He also was chairman of The Business Council from 1960 to 1961.

He was on the cover of Time Magazine on January 12, 1959. He was the recipient of the first Gold Medal Award of the Economic Club of New York.

Business positions
Preceded by Charles E. Wilson	President of General Electric; 1950–1958	Succeeded by Gerald L. Phillippe
Preceded by Philip D. Reed	Chairman of General Electric; 1958–1963	Succeeded by Gerald L. Phillippe
