= William Cordiner =

Scottish footballer

Personal information
- Full name: William Lindsay Cordiner
- Date of birth: 13 August 1908
- Place of birth: Coatbridge, Scotland
- Date of death: 9 October 1962 (aged 54)
- Place of death: Newton Mearns, Scotland
- Position: Centre forward

Senior career*
Years	Team	Apps	(Gls)
1927–1931	Queen's Park	29	(15)

International career
1931	Scotland Amateurs	1	(1)
- * Club domestic league appearances and goals

William Lindsay Cordiner (13 August 1908 – 9 October 1962) was a Scottish amateur football centre forward who played in the Scottish League for Queen's Park. He was capped by Scotland at amateur level.
