= General Electric =

American multinational conglomerate (1892–2024)

General Electric Company
- Final logo used from 2004 to 2024; still used by GE Aerospace, GE HealthCare, and GE Vernova.

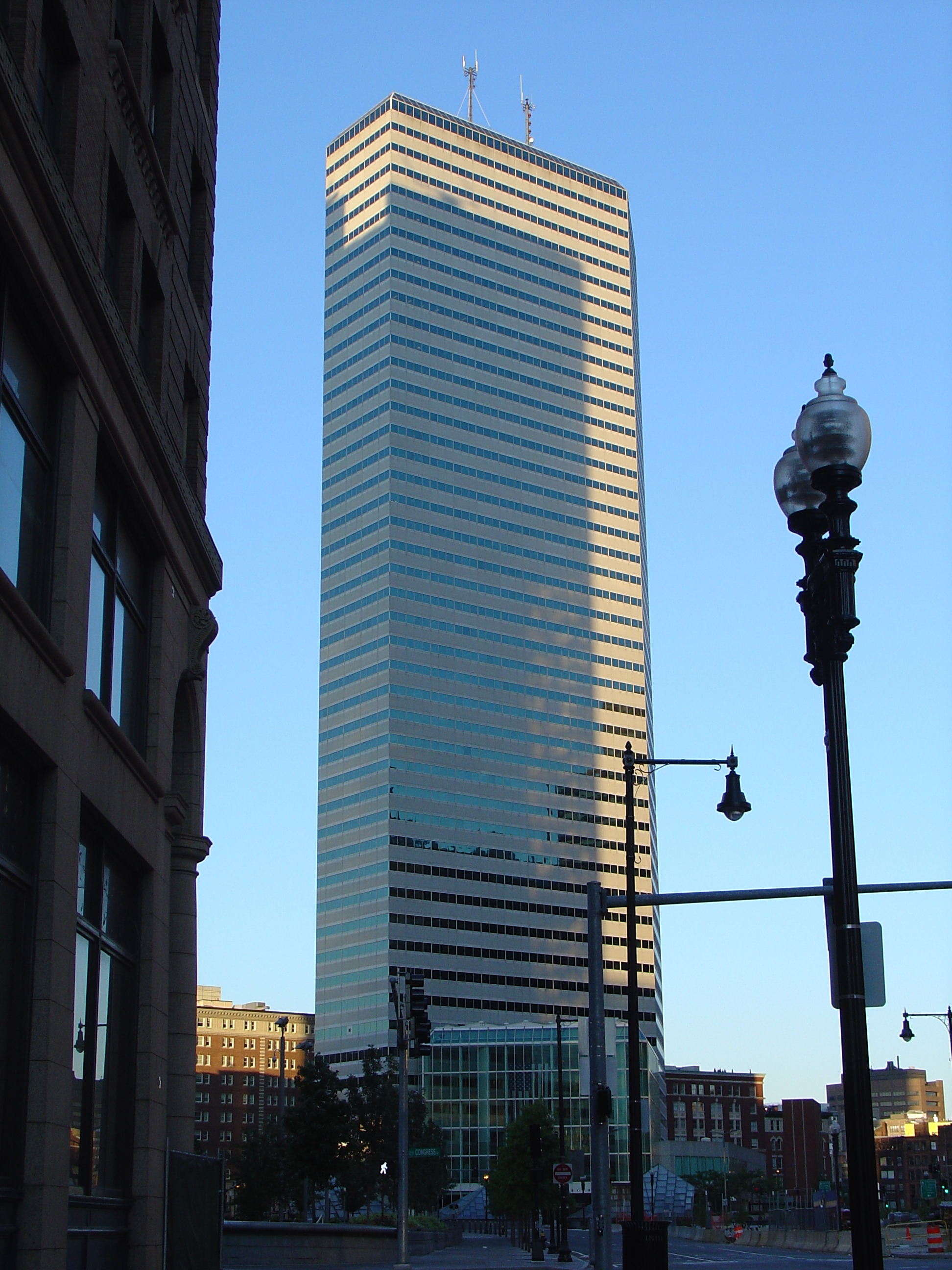
- One Financial Center, the final headquarters of General Electric in Boston, Massachusetts
- Type: Public
- Traded as: NYSE: GE; S&P 100 component; S&P 500 component; DJIA component (until 2018)
- ISIN: US3696043013 (2021–2024)
- Industry: Conglomerate
- Predecessors: Edison General Electric; Thomson-Houston Electric Company
- Founded: April 15, 1892; 134 years ago in Schenectady, New York, US
- Founders: Charles A. Coffin; Thomas Edison; Henry L. Higginson; J. P. Morgan; H. M. Twombly (et al.) (Note: Darius Ogden Mills, T. Jefferson Coolidge, and Frederick Lothrop Ames also qualify as founders because they all belonged to a committee responsible for overseeing the merger between Thomson-Houston Electric and Edison General Electric Company which led to General Electric's formation in 1892. Likewise, after the merger, all three figures became members of the new company's board of directors.)
- Defunct: April 2, 2024; 2 years ago (original company)
- Fate: Assets dispersed to three independent publicly traded companies
- Successors: GE Aerospace (legal successor); GE HealthCare; GE Vernova
- Headquarters: One Financial Center, Boston, Massachusetts, United States
- Area served: Worldwide
- Key people: Owen D. Young Chairman of the Board (1922–1940) & (1942–1945); Gerard Swope President (1922–1940) & (1942–1945); Philip D. Reed Chairman & CEO (1940-1942) & (1945–1959); Jack Welch Chairman & CEO (1981–2001); Jeff Immelt CEO (2001-2017)
- Revenue: ▲US$68 billion (2023)
- Operating income: ▲US$9 billion (2023)
- Net income: ▲US$9 billion (2023)
- Total assets: ▼US$163 billion (2023)
- Total equity: ▼US$29 billion (2023)
- Number of employees: 125,000 (2023)
- Subsidiaries: GE Aerospace; GE Appliances; GE Capital; GE Digital; GE Power; GE Renewable Energy; GE Research
- Website: www.ge.com

Evolution of Comcast
- 1909: Independent Moving Pictures was founded by Carl Laemmle as the predecessor to Universal
- 1912: Universal Studios Hollywood was founded after Independent Moving merged with several smaller film studios
- 1915: Universal City, California, was established as the entertainment district for the Universal Studios Lot.
- 1924: MCA Inc. was founded by Jules Stein as a talent agency to book musicians
- 1926: RCA Corporation launched the NBC Radio Network, and by 1939, NBC began broadcasting on television.
- 1934: Decca Records America was established and would later grow to become Universal Music Group
- 1946: William Goetz and Leo Spitz began managing Universal Pictures, after merging International Pictures
- 1952: Decca Records America acquired a controlling stake in Universal Pictures
- 1958: MCA acquired the Universal Studios film lot and later purchased Decca Records America, and Universal Pictures in 1962
- 1963: Comcast was founded as American Cable Systems by Ralph J. Roberts
- 1973: Decca Records America is retired as a brand and renamed to MCA Records
- 1986: General Electric acquired RCA Corp and dissolved the company while retaining ownership of NBC
- 1990: Panasonic acquired a Controlling interest in MCA, but sold it to Seagram within five years after growing costs
- 1998: MCA Records acquired Polygram N.V. from Philips and was renamed to Universal Music Group
- 2000: Seagram Entertainment was sold to Vivendi and merged with StudioCanal to become Vivendi Universal
- 2002: NBC acquired Telemundo while Comcast acquired AT&T Broadband
- 2004: Vivendi Universal was consolidated with General Electric's wholly owned NBC to form NBCUniversal, while Universal Music Group was separated
- 2013: Comcast closed its acquisition of NBCUniversal from General Electric
- 2018: Sky Group was acquired from 21st Century Fox after a bidding war
- 2020: Peacock was launched
- 2026: Majority of NBCU's cable networks were spun off into another company named Versant, while Comcast later announced it would spin-off NBCUniversal and Sky into a separate company

General Electric Company (GE) was an American multinational conglomerate. It played a role in the development of electric power, electric light, home appliances, aviation, and medical imaging. GE was established in 1892 through the merger of Thomas Edison's Edison General Electric Company and the Thomson-Houston Electric Company, a consolidation conceived and orchestrated by financier J. P. Morgan.

Over its history, GE had multiple divisions, including aerospace, transportation, energy, healthcare, lighting, locomotives, appliances, computers, and finance. In 2020, GE ranked among the Fortune 500 as the 33rd largest firm in the United States by gross revenue. In 2023, the company was ranked 64th in the Forbes Global 2000. In 2011, GE ranked among the Fortune 20 as the 14th most profitable company, but later very severely underperformed the market (by about 75%) as its profitability collapsed. Two employees of GE—Irving Langmuir (1932) and Ivar Giaever (1973)—have been awarded the Nobel Prize. From 1986 until 2013, GE was the owner of the NBC television network through its purchase of its former subsidiary RCA before its acquisition of NBC's parent company NBCUniversal by Comcast in 2011.

Following the Great Recession of the late 2000s, General Electric began selling off various divisions and assets, including its appliances and financial capital divisions, under Jeff Immelt's leadership as CEO. John Flannery, Immelt's replacement in 2017, further divested General Electric's assets in locomotives and lighting in order to focus the company more on aviation. Restrictions on air travel during the COVID-19 pandemic caused General Electric's revenue to fall significantly in 2020. Ultimately, GE's final CEO Larry Culp announced in November 2021 that General Electric was to be broken up into three separate, public companies by 2024. GE Aerospace, the aerospace company, is GE's legal successor. GE HealthCare, the health technology company, was spun off from GE in 2023. GE Vernova, the energy company, was founded when GE finalized the split. Following these transactions, GE Aerospace took the General Electric name and ticker symbols, while the old General Electric ceased to exist as a conglomerate.

== History ==
=== Formation ===
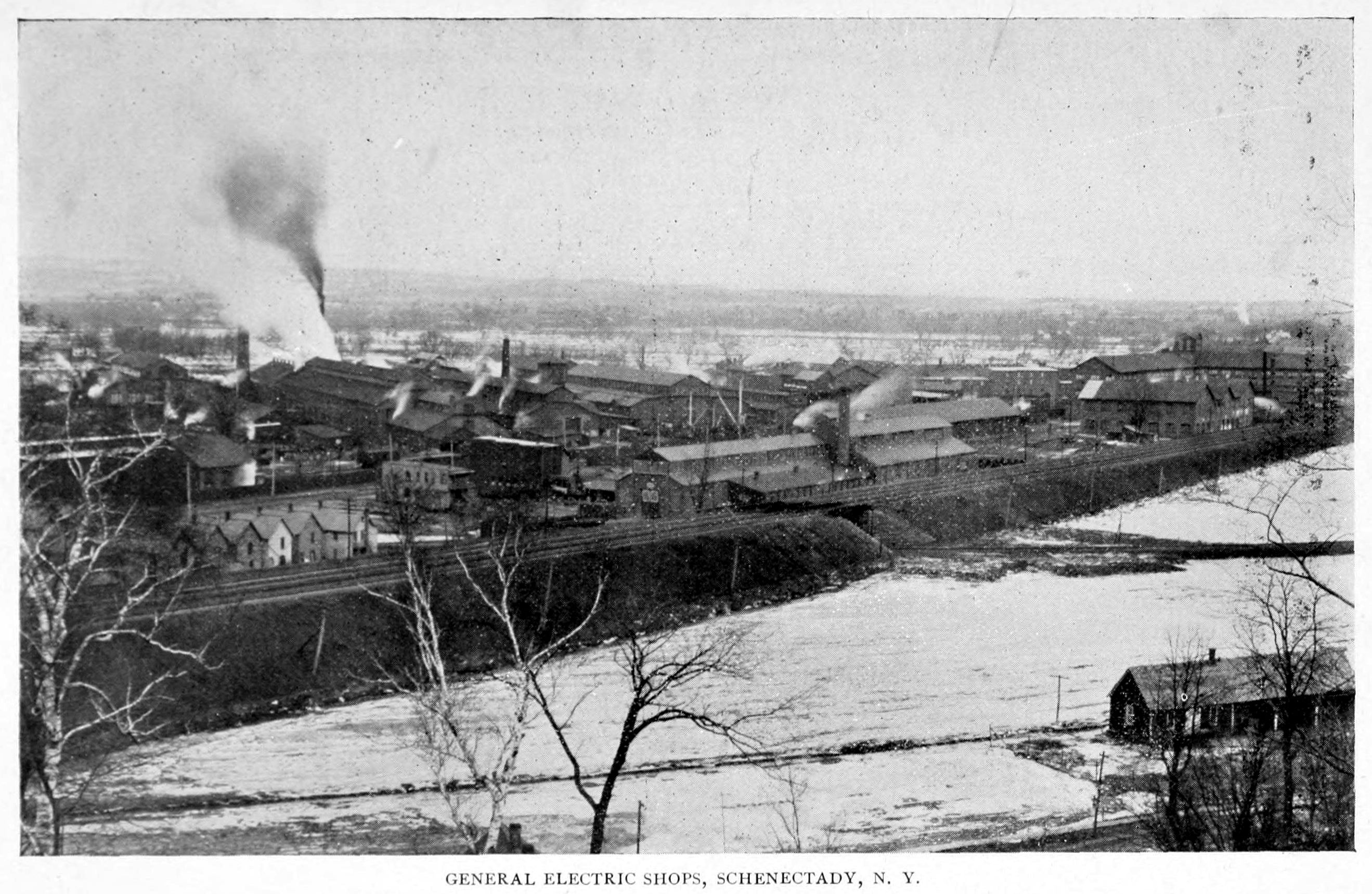
General Electric in Schenectady, New York, aerial view, 1896

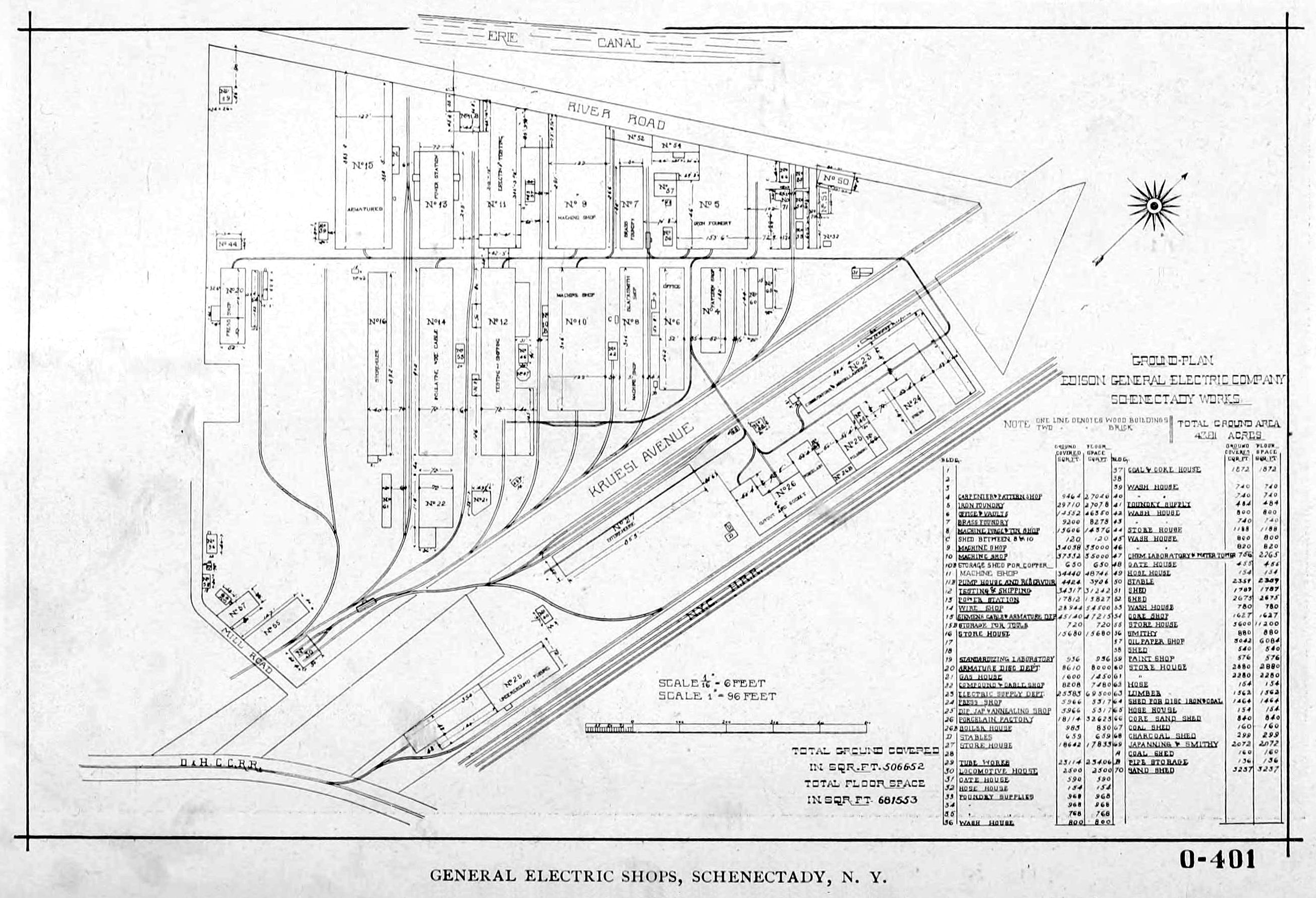
Plan of Schenectady plant, 1896

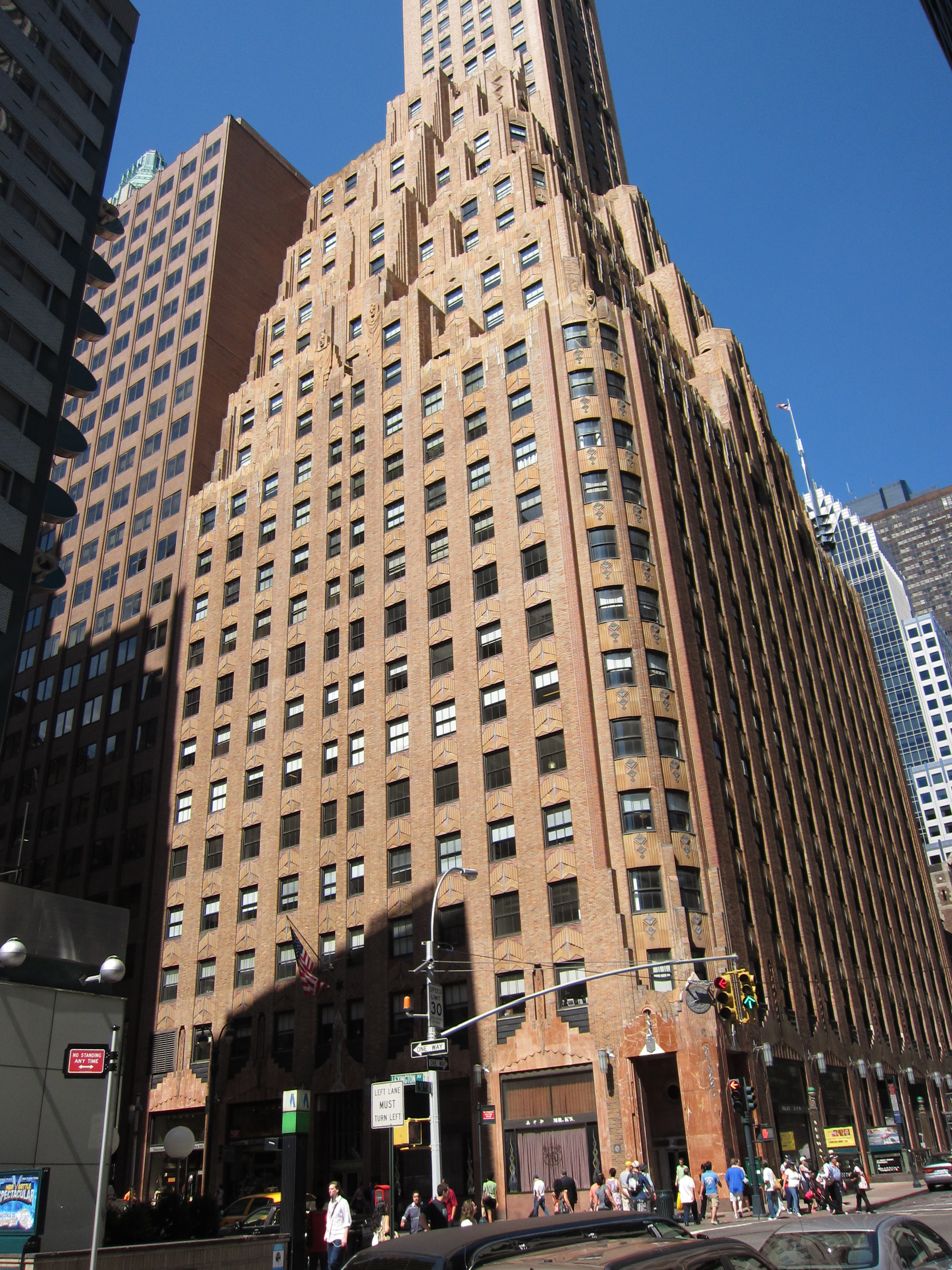
General Electric Building at 570 Lexington Avenue, New York

During 1889, Thomas Edison (1847–1931) had business interests in many electricity-related companies, including Edison Lamp Company, a lamp manufacturer in East Newark, New Jersey; Edison Machine Works, a manufacturer of dynamos and large electric motors in Schenectady, New York; Bergmann & Company, a manufacturer of electric lighting fixtures, sockets, and other electric lighting devices; and Edison Electric Light Company, the patent-holding company and financial arm for Edison's lighting experiments, backed by J. P. Morgan (1837–1913) and the Vanderbilt family.

Henry Villard, a long-time Edison supporter and investor, proposed to consolidate all of these business interests. The proposal was supported by Samuel Insull – who served as his secretary and, later, financier – as well other investors. In 1889, Drexel, Morgan & Co. – a company founded by J. P. Morgan and Anthony J. Drexel – financed Edison's research and helped merge several of Edison's separate companies under one corporation, forming Edison General Electric Company, which was incorporated in New York on April 24, 1889. The new company acquired Sprague Electric Railway & Motor Company in the same year. The consolidation did not involve all of the companies established by Edison; notably, the Edison Illuminating Company, which would later become Consolidated Edison, was not part of the merger.

In 1880, Gerald Waldo Hart formed the American Electric Company of New Britain, Connecticut, which merged a few years later with Thomson-Houston Electric Company, led by Charles Coffin. In 1887, Hart left to become superintendent of the Edison Electric Company. General Electric was formed through the 1892 merger of Edison General Electric Company and Thomson-Houston Electric Company with the support of Drexel, Morgan & Co. The original plants of both companies continue to operate under the GE banner to this day.

The General Electric business was incorporated in New York, with the Schenectady plant used as headquarters for many years thereafter. Around the same time, General Electric's Canadian counterpart, Canadian General Electric, was formed.

In 1893, General Electric brought Charles Steinmetz on board through the acquisition of a smaller New York company. A genius in both mathematics and electronics, he earned over 200 patents and proved a major force in advancing GE.

=== Public company ===
In 1896, General Electric was one of the original 12 companies listed on the newly formed Dow Jones Industrial Average, where it remained a part of the index for 122 years, though not continuously.

In 1900, GE bought the U.S. business of Siemens-Halske.

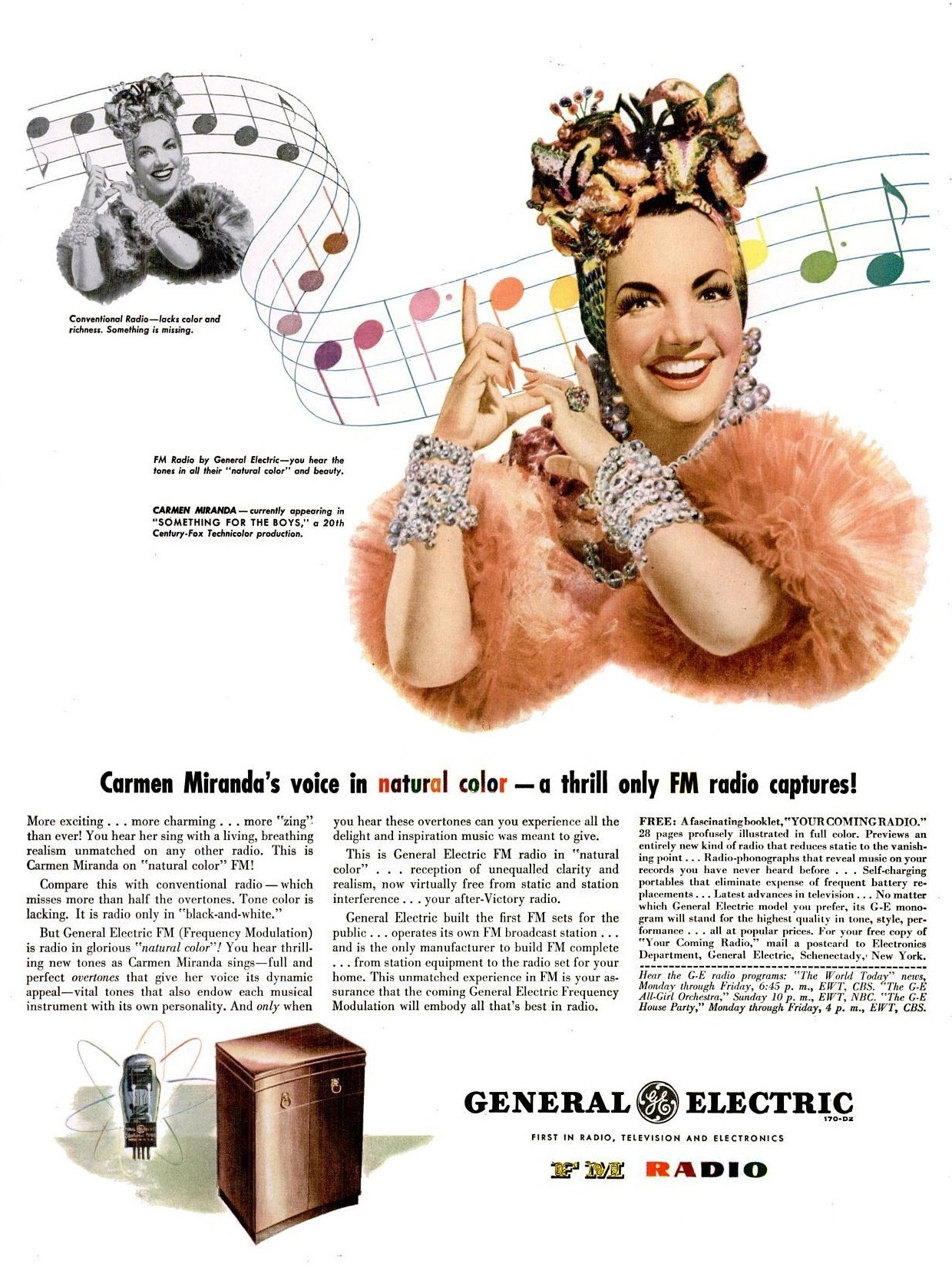
Carmen Miranda in a 1945 advertisement for a General Electric FM radio in The Saturday Evening Post

In 1911, General Electric absorbed the National Electric Lamp Association (NELA) into its lighting business. GE established its lighting division headquarters at Nela Park in East Cleveland, Ohio. The lighting division has since remained in the same location.

During World War I, GE's contributions to the American military included submarine motors, airplane compasses, winch drives for balloons, telephone switchboards, and bomb-release mechanisms.

=== RCA and NBC ===
Owen D. Young, who was then GE's general counsel and vice president, through GE, founded the Radio Corporation of America (RCA) in 1919. This came after Young, while working with senior naval officers, purchased the Marconi Wireless Telegraph Company of America, which was a subsidiary of the British company Marconi Wireless and Signal Company. He aimed to expand international radio communications. GE used RCA as its retail arm for radio sales. In 1926, RCA co-founded the National Broadcasting Company (NBC), which built two radio broadcasting networks. In 1930, General Electric was charged with antitrust violations and was ordered to divest itself of RCA.

=== Refrigeration ===
General Electric's first refrigerator, the Monitor Top, was launched in 1926, with business executive T.K. Quinn successfully predicting that the company would need to sell 50,000 units in order to be able to produce the product at a cost that would allow them to sell at a price that would enable them to compete with competitors Kelvinator and Frigidaire. The product had competitive advantages, such as being quiet, comparatively low in energy consumption and being hermetically sealed, and by 1930 General Electric had a 34.1% market share of refrigeration appliances in the US.

=== Television ===
In 1927, Ernst Alexanderson of GE made the first demonstration of television broadcast reception at his General Electric Realty Plot home at 1132 Adams Road in Schenectady, New York. On January 13, 1928, he made what was said to be the first broadcast to the public in the United States on GE's W2XAD: the pictures were picked up on 1.5 square inches (9.7 square centimeters) screens in the homes of four GE executives. The sound was broadcast on GE's WGY (AM).

Experimental television station W2XAD evolved into the station WRGB, which, along with WGY and WGFM (now WRVE), was owned and operated by General Electric until 1983. In 1965, the company expanded into cable with the launch of a franchise, which was awarded to a non-exclusive franchise in Schenectady through subsidiary General Electric Cablevision Corporation. On February 15, 1965, General Electric expanded its holdings in order to acquire more television stations to meet the maximum limit of the FCC, and more cable holdings through subsidiaries General Electric Broadcasting Company and General Electric Cablevision Corporation.

The company also owned television stations such as KOA-TV (now KCNC-TV) in Denver and WSIX-TV (later WNGE-TV, now WKRN) in Nashville, but like WRGB, General Electric sold off most of its broadcasting holdings, but held on to the Denver television station until in 1986, when General Electric bought out RCA and made it into an owned-and-operated station by NBC. It even stayed on until 1995 when it was transferred to a joint venture between CBS and Group W in a swap deal, alongside KUTV in Salt Lake City for longtime CBS O&O in Philadelphia, WCAU-TV.

==== Former General Electric-owned stations ====
Stations are arranged in alphabetical order by state and city of license.

- (**) Indicates a station that was built and signed on by General Electric.

City of license / Market	Station	Channel TV (RF)	Years owned	Current ownership status
Denver, Colorado	KCNC-TV	4 (35)	1968–1986	CBS owned-and-operated station, owned by CBS News and Stations
Albany, New York	WRGB **	6 (35)	1942–1983	CBS affiliate owned by Sinclair Broadcast Group
Nashville, Tennessee	WNGE	2 (27)	1966–1983	ABC affiliate WKRN-TV owned by Nexstar Media Group

=== Radio stations ===
AM Station	FM Station

City of license / Market	Station	Years owned	Current ownership status
San Francisco	KGO 810 **	1924–1945	owned by Cumulus Media
San Francisco	KFOG 104.5	1974–1986	KNBR-FM, owned by Cumulus Media
Denver	KOA 850 **	1924–1953; 1968–1983	owned by iHeartMedia
Denver	KOAQ 103.5	1968–1983	KRFX, owned by iHeartMedia
Boston	WJIB 96.9	1972–1983	WBQT, owned by Beasley Broadcast Group
Albany – Schenectady – Troy, N.Y.	WGY 810 **	1922–1983	owned by iHeartMedia
Albany – Schenectady – Troy, N.Y.	WGFM 99.5 **	1939–1983	WRVE, owned by iHeartMedia
Nashville	WSIX 980	1966–1983	WYFN, owned by Bible Broadcasting Network
Nashville	WSIX-FM 97.9	1966–1983	owned by iHeartMedia

=== Power generation ===
Led by Sanford Alexander Moss, GE moved into the new field of aircraft turbosuperchargers. This technology also led to the development of industrial gas turbine engines used for power production. GE introduced the first set of superchargers during World War I and continued to develop them during the interwar period. Superchargers became indispensable in the years immediately before World War II. GE supplied 300,000 turbosuperchargers for use in fighter and bomber engines. This work led the U.S. Army Air Corps to select GE to develop the nation's first jet engine during the war. This experience, in turn, made GE a natural selection to develop the Whittle W.1 jet engine that was demonstrated in the United States in 1941. GE was ranked ninth among United States corporations in the value of wartime production contracts. However, their early work with Whittle's designs was later handed to Allison Engine Company. GE Aviation then emerged as one of the world's largest engine manufacturers, bypassing the British company Rolls-Royce plc.

Some consumers boycotted GE light bulbs, refrigerators, and other products during the 1980s and 1990s. The purpose of the boycott was to protest against GE's role in nuclear weapons production.

In 2002, GE acquired the wind power assets of Enron during its bankruptcy proceedings. Enron Wind was the only surviving U.S. manufacturer of large wind turbines at the time, and GE increased engineering and supplies for the Wind Division and doubled the annual sales to $1.2 billion in 2003. It acquired ScanWind in 2009.

In 2018, GE Power garnered press attention when a model 7HA gas turbine in Texas was shut down for two months due to the break of a turbine blade. This model uses similar blade technology to GE's newest and most efficient model, the 9HA. After the break, GE developed new protective coatings and heat treatment methods. Gas turbines represent a significant portion of GE Power's revenue, and also represent a significant portion of the power generation fleet of several utility companies in the United States. Chubu Electric of Japan and Électricité de France also had units that were impacted. Initially, GE did not realize the turbine blade issue of the 9FB unit would impact the new HA units.

=== Computing ===
GE was one of the eight major computer companies of the 1960s along with IBM, Burroughs, NCR, Control Data Corporation, Honeywell, RCA, and UNIVAC. GE had a line of general purpose and special purpose computers, including the GE 200, GE 400, and GE 600 series general-purpose computers, the GE/PAC 4000 series real-time process control computers, and the DATANET-30 and Datanet 355 message switching computers (DATANET-30 and 355 were also used as front end processors for GE mainframe computers). A Datanet 500 computer was designed but never sold.

In 1956 Homer Oldfield was promoted to General Manager of GE's Computer Department. He facilitated the invention and construction of the Bank of America ERMA system, the first computerized system designed to read magnetized numbers on checks. But he was fired from GE in 1958 by Ralph J. Cordiner for overstepping his bounds and successfully gaining the ERMA contract. Cordiner was strongly against GE entering the computer business because he did not see the potential in it.

In 1962, GE started developing its GECOS (later renamed GCOS) operating system, originally for batch processing, but later extended to time-sharing and transaction processing. Versions of GCOS are still in use today. From 1964 to 1969, GE and Bell Laboratories (which soon dropped out) joined with MIT to develop the Multics operating system on the GE 645 mainframe computer. The project took longer than expected and was not a major commercial success, but it demonstrated concepts such as single-level storage, dynamic linking, hierarchical file system, and ring-oriented security. Active development of Multics continued until 1985.

GE got into computer manufacturing because, in the 1950s, they were the largest user of computers outside the United States federal government, aside from being the first business in the world to own a computer. Its major appliance manufacturing plant "Appliance Park" was the first non-governmental site to host one. However, in 1970, GE sold its computer division to Honeywell, exiting the computer manufacturing industry, though it retained its timesharing operations for some years afterward. GE was a big provider of computer time-sharing services through General Electric Information Services (GEIS, now GXS), offering online computing services that included GEnie.

In 2000, when United Technologies Corp. planned to buy Honeywell, GE made a counter-offer that was approved by Honeywell. On July 3, 2001, the European Union issued a statement that "prohibit the proposed acquisition by General Electric Co. of Honeywell Inc.". The reasons given were it "would create or strengthen dominant positions on several markets and that the remedies proposed by GE were insufficient to resolve the competition concerns resulting from the proposed acquisition of Honeywell".

On June 27, 2014, GE partnered with collaborative design company Quirky to announce its connected LED bulb called Link. The Link bulb is designed to communicate with smartphones and tablets using a mobile app called Wink.

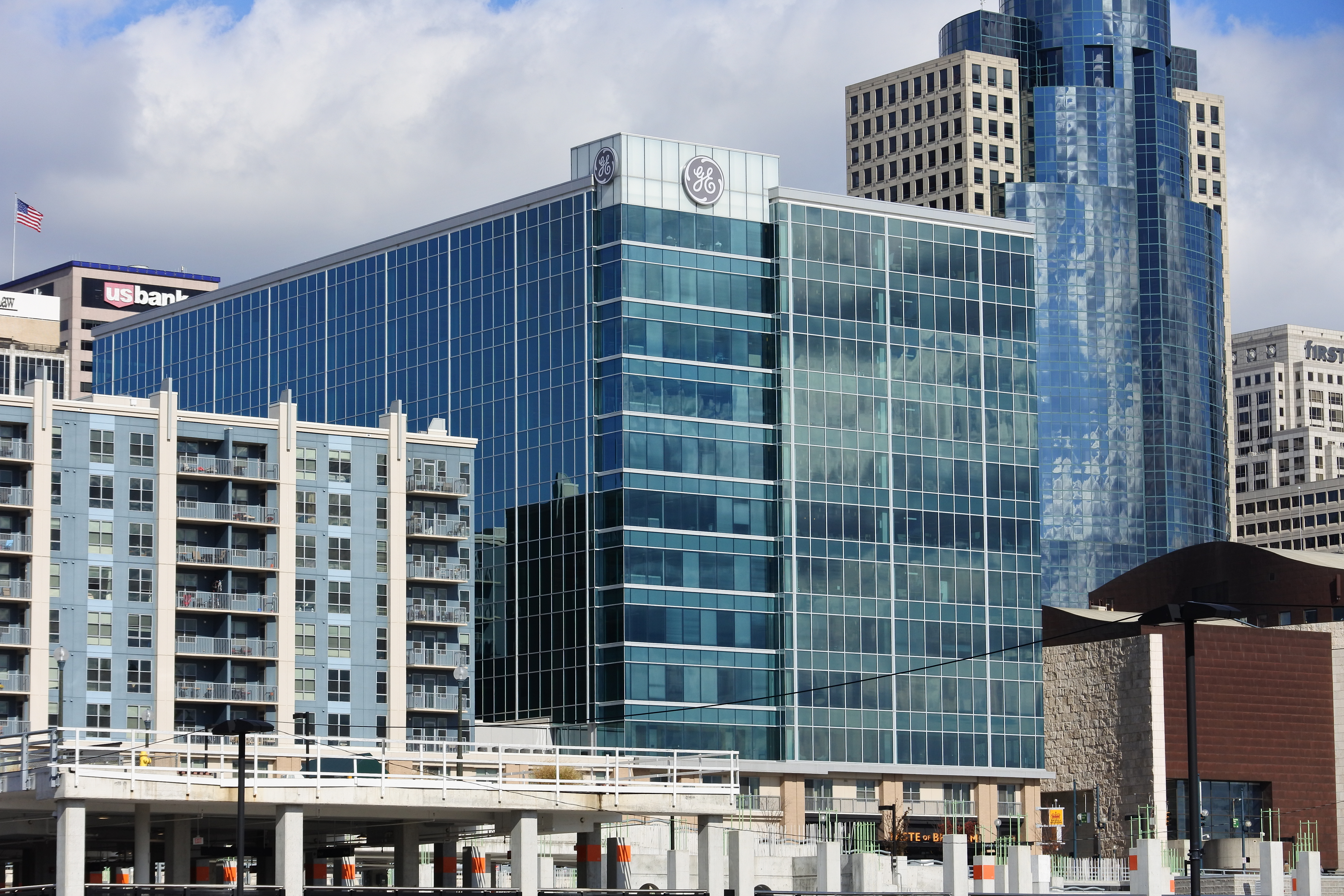
GE Global Operations Center in Downtown Cincinnati, Ohio

=== Acquisitions and divestments ===
In December 1985, GE reacquired the RCA Corporation, primarily to gain ownership of the NBC television network for $6.28 billion; this merger surpassed the Capital Cities/ABC merger from earlier that year as the largest non-oil company merger in world business history. The remainder of RCA's divisions and assets were sold to various companies, including Bertelsmann Music Group which acquired RCA Records. Thomson SA, which licensed the manufacture of RCA and GE branded electronics, traced its roots to Thomson-Houston, one of the original components of GE. Also in 1986, Kidder, Peabody & Co., a U.S.-based securities firm, was sold to GE and following heavy losses was sold to PaineWebber in 1994.

In 1993, GE sold its Aerospace business to Martin Marietta.

In 1997, Genpact was founded as a unit of General Electric in Gurgaon, India. The company was founded as GE Capital International Services (GECIS). In the beginning, GECIS created processes for outsourcing back-office activities for GE Capital such as processing car loans and credit card transactions. It was an experimental concept at the time and the beginning of the business process outsourcing (BPO) industry. GE sold 60% stake in Genpact to General Atlantic and Oak Hill Capital Partners in 2005 and hived off Genpact into an independent business. GE is still a major client to Genpact today for services in customer service, finance, information technology, and analytics.

In 2001, GE acquired Spanish-language broadcaster Telemundo and incorporated it into its National Broadcasting Company, Inc. subsidiary.

In 2002, Francisco Partners and Norwest Venture Partners acquired a division of GE called GE Information Systems (GEIS). The new company, named GXS, is based in Gaithersburg, Maryland. GXS is a provider of business-to-business e-commerce solutions. GE maintains a minority stake in GXS. Also in 2002, GE Wind Energy was formed when GE bought the wind turbine manufacturing assets of Enron Wind after the Enron scandals.

In 2004, GE bought 80% of Vivendi Universal Entertainment, the parent of Universal Pictures from Vivendi. Vivendi Universal was merged with NBC to form NBCUniversal. GE then owned 80% of NBCUniversal and Vivendi owned 20%. In 2004, GE completed the spin-off of most of its mortgage and life insurance assets into an independent company, Genworth Financial, based in Richmond, Virginia.

In May 2007, GE acquired Smiths Aerospace for $4.8 billion. Also in 2007, GE Oil & Gas acquired Vetco Gray for $1.9 billion, followed by the acquisition of Hydril Pressure & Control in 2008 for $1.1 billion.

GE Plastics was sold in 2008 to SABIC (Saudi Arabia Basic Industries Corporation). In May 2008, GE announced it was exploring options for divesting the bulk of its consumer and industrial business.

On December 3, 2009, it was announced that NBCUniversal would become a joint venture between GE and cable television operator Comcast. Comcast would hold a controlling interest in the company, while GE would retain a 49% stake and would buy out shares owned by Vivendi.

Vivendi would sell its 20% stake in NBCUniversal to GE for US$5.8 billion. Vivendi would sell 7.66% of NBCUniversal to GE for US$2 billion if the GE/Comcast deal was not completed by September 2010 and then sell the remaining 12.34% stake of NBCUniversal to GE for US$3.8 billion when the deal was completed or to the public via an IPO if the deal was not completed.

On March 1, 2010, GE announced plans to sell its 20.85% stake in Turkey-based Garanti Bank. In August 2010, GE Healthcare signed a strategic partnership to bring cardiovascular Computed Tomography (CT) technology from start-up Arineta Ltd. of Israel to the hospital market. In October 2010, GE acquired gas engines manufacturer Dresser Industries in a $3 billion deal and also bought a $1.6 billion portfolio of retail credit cards from Citigroup Inc. On October 14, 2010, GE announced the acquisition of data migration & SCADA simulation specialists Opal Software. In December 2010, for the second time that year (after the Dresser acquisition), GE bought the oil sector company Wellstream, an oil pipe maker, for 800 million pounds ($1.3 billion).

In March 2011, GE announced that it had completed the acquisition of privately held Lineage Power Holdings from The Gores Group. In April 2011, GE announced it had completed its purchase of John Wood plc's Well Support Division for $2.8 billion.

In 2011, GE Capital sold its $2 billion Mexican assets to Santander for $162 million and exited the business in Mexico. Santander additionally assumed the portfolio debts of GE Capital in the country. Following this, GE Capital focused on its core business and shed its non-core assets.

In June 2012, CEO and President of GE Jeff Immelt said that the company would invest ₹3 billion to accelerate its businesses in Karnataka. In October 2012, GE acquired $7 billion worth of bank deposits from MetLife Inc.

On March 19, 2013, Comcast bought GE's shares in NBCU for $16.7 billion, ending the company's longtime stake in television and film media.

In April 2013, GE acquired oilfield pump maker Lufkin Industries for $2.98 billion.

In April 2014, it was announced that GE was in talks to acquire the global power division of French engineering group Alstom for a figure of around $13 billion. A rival joint bid was submitted in June 2014 by Siemens and Mitsubishi Heavy Industries (MHI) with Siemens seeking to acquire Alstom's gas turbine business for €3.9 billion, and MHI proposing a joint venture in steam turbines, plus a €3.1 billion cash investment. In June 2014, a formal offer from GE worth $17 billion was agreed by the Alstom board. Part of the transaction involved the French government taking a 20% stake in Alstom to help secure France's energy and transport interests and French jobs. A rival offer from Siemens Mitsubishi Heavy Industries was rejected. The acquisition was expected to be completed in 2015. In October 2014, GE announced it was considering the sale of its Polish banking business Bank BPH.

Later in 2014, General Electric announced plans to open its global operations center in Cincinnati, Ohio. The Global Operations Center opened in October 2016 as home to GE's multifunctional shared services organization. It supports the company's finance/accounting, human resources, information technology, supply chain, legal and commercial operations, and is one of GE's four multifunctional shared services centers worldwide in Pudong, China; Budapest, Hungary; and Monterrey, Mexico.

In April 2015, GE announced its intention to sell off its property portfolio, worth $26.5 billion, to Wells Fargo and The Blackstone Group. It was announced in April 2015 that GE would sell most of its finance unit and return around $90 billion to shareholders as the firm looked to trim down on its holdings and rid itself of its image of a "hybrid" company, working in both banking and manufacturing. In August 2015, GE Capital agreed to sell its Healthcare Financial Services business to Capital One for US$9 billion. The transaction involved US$8.5 billion of loans made to a wide array of sectors, including senior housing, hospitals, medical offices, outpatient services, pharmaceuticals, and medical devices. Also in August 2015, GE Capital agreed to sell GE Capital Bank's on-line deposit platform to Goldman Sachs. Terms of the transaction were not disclosed, but the sale included US$8 billion of on-line deposits and another US$8 billion of brokered certificates of deposit. The sale was part of GE's strategic plan to exit the U.S. banking sector and to free itself from tightening banking regulations. GE also aimed to shed its status as a "systemically important financial institution".

In September 2015, GE Capital agreed to sell its transportation finance unit to Canada's Bank of Montreal. The unit sold had US$8.7 billion (CA$11.5 billion) of assets, 600 employees, and 15 offices in the U.S. and Canada. The exact terms of the sale were not disclosed, but the final price would be based on the value of the assets at closing, plus a premium according to the parties. In October 2015, activist investor Nelson Peltz's fund Trian bought a $2.5 billion stake in the company.

In January 2016, Haier acquired GE's appliance division for $5.4 billion. In October 2016, GE Renewable Energy agreed to pay €1.5 billion to Doughty Hanson & Co for LM Wind Power during 2017.

At the end of October 2016, it was announced that GE was under negotiations for a deal valued at about $30 billion to combine GE Oil & Gas with Baker Hughes. The transaction would create a publicly traded entity controlled by GE. It was announced that GE Oil & Gas would sell off its water treatment business, GE Water & Process Technologies, as part of its divestment agreement with Baker Hughes. The deal was cleared by the EU in May 2017, and by the United States Department of Justice in June 2017. The merger agreement was approved by shareholders at the end of June 2017. On July 3, 2017, the transaction was completed, and Baker Hughes became a GE company and was renamed Baker Hughes, a GE Company (BHGE). In November 2018, GE reduced its stake in Baker Hughes to 50.4%. On October 18, 2019, GE reduced its stake to 36.8% and the company was renamed back to Baker Hughes.

In May 2017, GE had signed $15 billion of business deals with Saudi Arabia. Saudi Arabia is one of GE's largest customers. In September 2017, GE announced the sale of its Industrial Solutions Business to ABB. The deal closed on June 30, 2018.

=== Fraud allegations and notice of possible SEC civil action ===
On August 15, 2019, Harry Markopolos, a financial fraud investigator known for his discovery of a Ponzi scheme run by Bernard Madoff, accused General Electric of being a "bigger fraud than Enron", alleging $38 billion in accounting fraud. GE denied wrongdoing.

On October 6, 2020, General Electric reported it received a Wells notice from the Securities and Exchange Commission stating the SEC may take civil action for possible violations of securities laws.

==== Insufficient reserves for long-term care policies ====
It is alleged that GE is "hiding" (i.e., under-reserved) $29 billion in losses related to its long-term care business.

According to an August 2019 Fitch Ratings report, there are concerns that GE has not set aside enough money to cover its long-term care liabilities.

In 2018, a lawsuit (the Bezio case) was filed in New York state court on behalf of participants in GE's 401(k) plan and shareowners alleging violations of Section 11 of the Securities Act of 1933 based on alleged misstatements and omissions related to insurance reserves and performance of GE's business segments.

The Kansas Insurance Department (KID) is requiring General Electric to make $14.5 billion of capital contributions for its insurance contracts during the 7-year period ending in 2024.

GE reported the total liability related to its insurance contracts increased significantly from 2016 to 2019:

December 31, 2016 $26.1 billion
December 31, 2017 $38.6 billion
December 31, 2018 $35.6 billion
December 31, 2019 $39.6 billion

In 2018, GE announced that the issuance of the new standard by the Financial Accounting Standards Board (FASB) regarding Financial Services – Insurance (Topic 944) would materially affect its financial statements. Mr. Markopolos estimated there would be a $US 10.5 billion charge when the new accounting standard is adopted in the first quarter of 2021.

==== Anticipated $8 billion loss upon disposition of Baker Hughes ====
In 2017, GE acquired a 62.5% interest in Baker Hughes (BHGE) when it combined its oil & gas business with Baker Hughes Incorporated. In 2018, GE reduced its interest to 50.4%, resulting in the realization of a $2.1 billion loss. GE is planning to divest its remaining interest and has warned that the divestment will result in an additional loss of $8.4 billion (assuming a BHGE share price of $23.57 per share). In response to the fraud allegations, GE noted the amount of the loss would be $7.4 billion if the divestment occurred on July 26, 2019. Mr. Markopolos noted that BHGE is an asset available for sale and therefore mark-to-market accounting is required.

Markopolos noted GE's current ratio was only 0.67. He expressed concerns that GE may file for bankruptcy if there is a recession.

=== Final years and three-way split (2018–2024) ===
In 2018, the GE Pension Plan reported losses of US$3.3 billion on plan assets.

In 2018, General Electric changed the discount rate used to calculate the actuarial liabilities of its pension plans. The rate was increased from 3.64% to 4.34%. Consequently, the reported liability for the underfunded pension plans decreased by $7 billion year-over-year, from $34.2 billion in 2017 to $27.2 billion in 2018.

In October 2018, General Electric announced it would "freeze pensions" for about 20,000 salaried U.S. employees. The employees will be moved to a defined contribution retirement plan in 2021.

On March 30, 2020, General Electric factory workers protested to convert jet engine factories to make ventilators during the COVID-19 crisis.

In June 2020, GE made an agreement to sell its Lighting business to Savant Systems, Inc. Financial details of the transaction were not disclosed.

In November 2020, General Electric warned it would be cutting jobs waiting for a recovery due to the COVID-19 pandemic.

On November 9, 2021, the company announced it would divide itself into three public companies. On July 18, 2022, GE unveiled the brand names of the companies it had devised through its planned separation: GE Aerospace, GE HealthCare, and GE Vernova. The new companies are respectively focused on aerospace, healthcare, and energy (renewable energy, power, and digital). The first spin-off of GE HealthCare was finalized on January 4, 2023; GE continues to hold 10.24% of shares and intends to sell the remaining over time. This was followed by the spin-off of GE's portfolio of energy businesses, which became GE Vernova on April 2, 2024. Following these transactions, GE became an aviation-focused company; GE Aerospace is the legal successor of the original GE. The company's legal name is still General Electric Company.

== Financial performance ==
Year	Revenue in mil. US$	Net income in mil. US$	Total assets in mil. US$	Price per share in US$	Employees
2005	136,580	16,720	673,321	22.35	
2006	151,568	20,742	696,683	22.43	
2007	172,488	22,208	795,683	25.44	
2008	181,581	17,335	797,769	19.44	
2009	154,438	10,725	781,901	9.96	
2010	149,567	11,344	747,793	12.68	
2011	146,542	13,120	718,189	14.32	
2012	146,684	13,641	684,999	16.56	
2013	113,245	13,057	656,560	20.32	307,000
2014	117,184	15,233	654,954	22.72	305,000
2015	117,386	−6,145	493,071	24.28	333,000
2016	123,693	8,176	365,183	28.36	295,000
2017	122,092	−6,222	377,945	25.02	313,000
2018	121,615	−22,802	309,129	12.71	283,000
2019	95,214	-5,439	265,177	56.57	205,000
2020	79,619	5,230	253,452	53.13	174,000
2021	74,196	-6,757	198,874	58.91	168,000
2022	76,555	-64	187,788	52.55	172,000

=== Dividends ===
General Electric was a longtime "dividend aristocrat" (a company with a long history of maintaining dividend payments to shareholders). Until 2017, the company had never cut dividends for 119 years before a 50% dividend reduction from 24 cents per share to 12 cents per share. In 2018, GE further reduced its quarterly dividend from 12 cents to 1 cent per share.

== Stock ==
As a publicly traded company on the New York Stock Exchange, GE stock was one of the 30 components of the Dow Jones Industrial Average from 1907 to 2018, the longest continuous presence of any company on the index, and during this time the only company that was part of the original Dow Jones Industrial Index created in 1896. In August 2000, the company had a market capitalization of $601 billion, and was the most valuable company in the world. On June 26, 2018, the stock was removed from the index and replaced with Walgreens Boots Alliance. In the years leading to its removal, GE was the worst performing stock in the Dow, falling more than 55 percent year on year and more than 25 percent year to date. The company continued to lose value after being removed from the index.

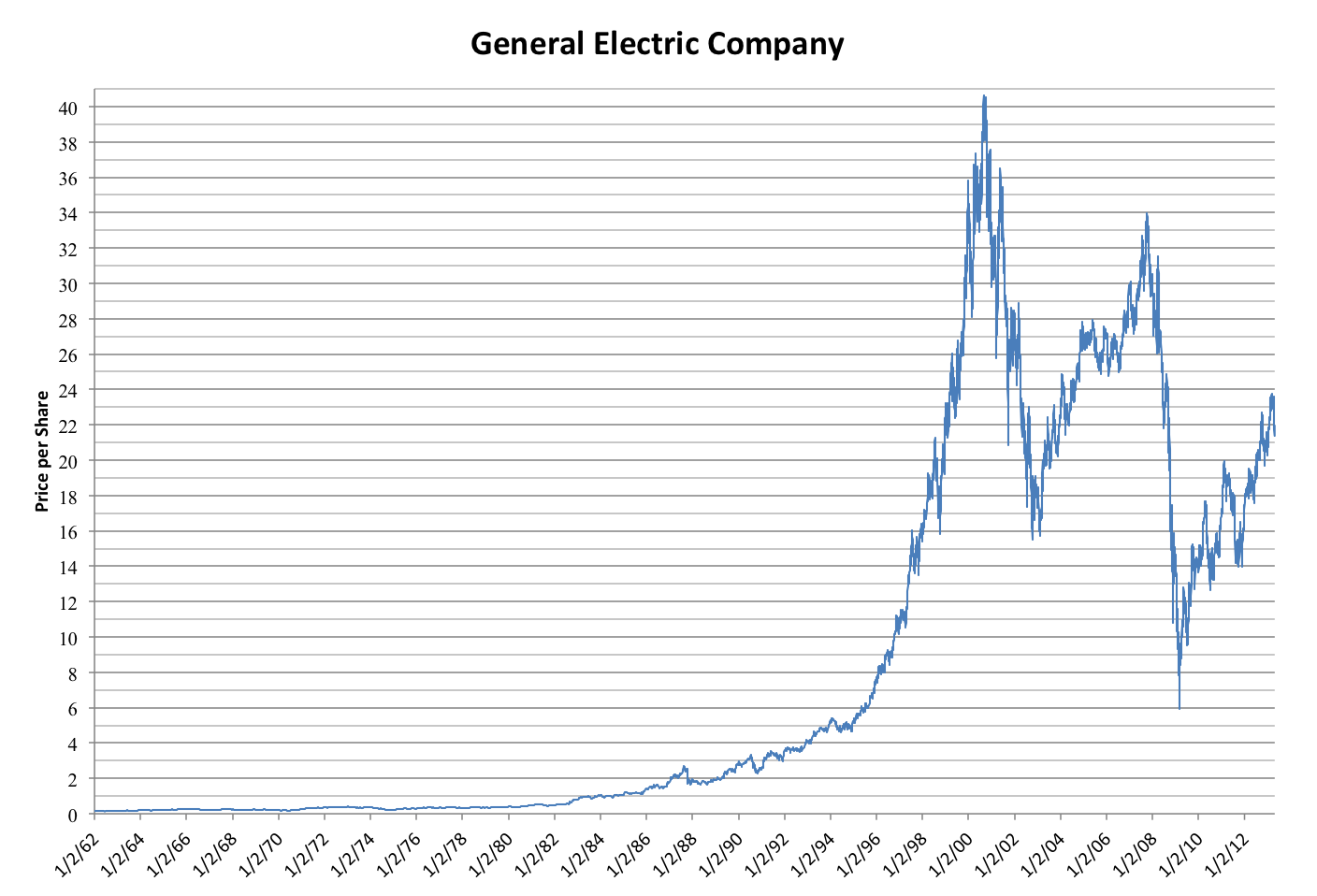
Linear GE stock price graph 1962–2013

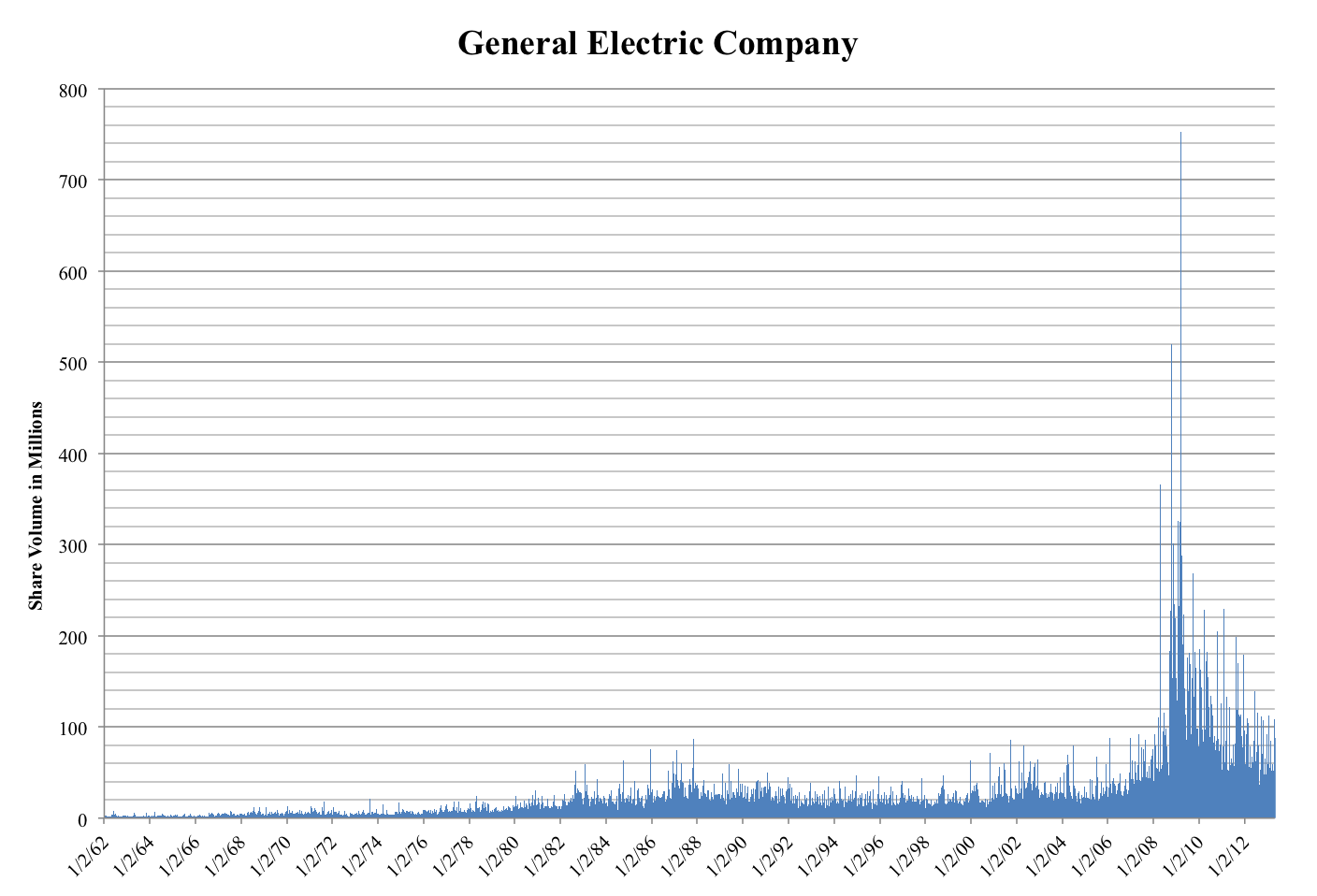
GE trading volume graph

General Electric Co. announced on July 30, 2021 (the completion of) a reverse stock split of GE common stock at a ratio of 1-for-8 and trading on a split-adjusted basis with a new ISIN number (US3696043013) starting on August 2, 2021.

== Corporate affairs ==
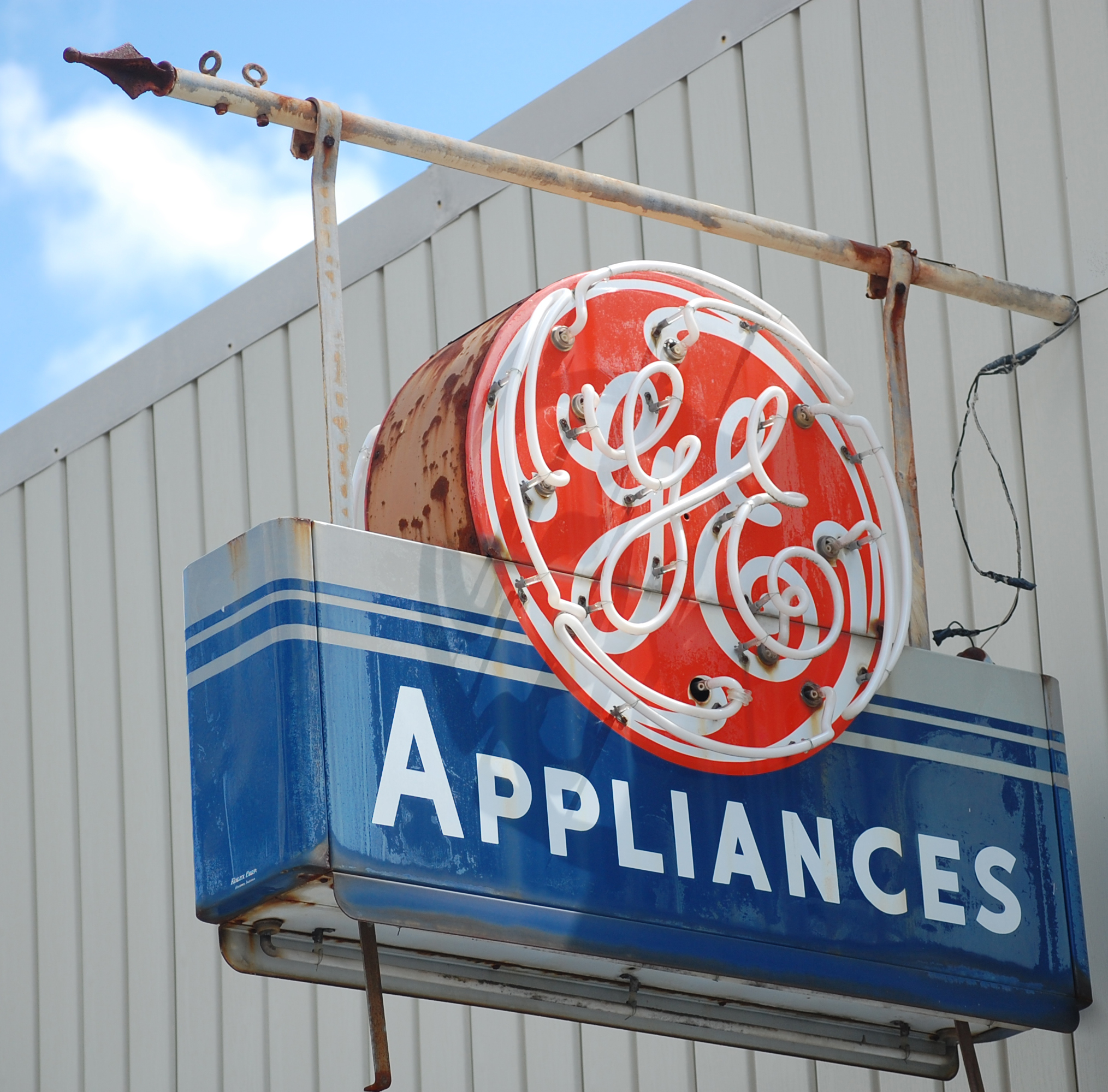
A General Electric neon sign

In 1959, General Electric was accused of promoting the largest illegal cartel in the United States since the adoption of the Sherman Antitrust Act of 1890 in order to maintain artificially high prices. In total, 29 companies and 45 executives would be convicted. Subsequent Congressional inquiries revealed that "white-collar crime" was by far the most costly form of crime for the United States' finances.

GE was a multinational conglomerate headquartered in Boston, Massachusetts. However its main offices were located at 30 Rockefeller Plaza at Rockefeller Center in New York City, known now as the Comcast Building. It was formerly known as the GE Building for the prominent GE logo on the roof; NBC's headquarters and main studios are also located in the building. Through its RCA subsidiary, it has been associated with the center since its construction in the 1930s. GE moved its corporate headquarters from the GE Building on Lexington Avenue to Fairfield, Connecticut in 1974. In 2016, GE announced a move to the South Boston Waterfront neighborhood of Boston, Massachusetts, partly as a result of an incentive package provide by state and city governments. The first group of workers arrived in the summer of 2016, and the full move will be completed by 2018. Due to poor financial performance and corporate downsizing, GE sold the land it planned to build its new headquarters building on, instead choosing to occupy neighboring leased buildings.

GE's tax return is the largest return filed in the United States; the 2005 return was approximately 24,000 pages when printed out, and 237 megabytes when submitted electronically. As of 2011, the company spent more on U.S. lobbying than any other company.

In 2005, GE launched its "Ecomagination" initiative in an attempt to position itself as a "green" company. GE is one of the biggest players in the wind power industry and is developing environment-friendly products such as hybrid locomotives, desalination and water reuse solutions, and photovoltaic cells. The company "plans to build the largest solar-panel-making factory in the U.S." and has set goals for its subsidiaries to lower their greenhouse gas emissions.

On May 21, 2007, GE announced it would sell its GE Plastics division to petrochemicals manufacturer SABIC for net proceeds of $11.6 billion. The transaction took place on August 31, 2007, and the company name changed to SABIC Innovative Plastics, with Brian Gladden as CEO.

In July 2010, GE agreed to pay $23.4 million to settle an SEC complaint without admitting or denying the allegations that two of its subsidiaries bribed Iraqi government officials to win contracts under the U.N. oil-for-food program between 2002 and 2003.

In February 2017, GE announced that the company intends to close the gender gap by promising to hire and place 20,000 women in technical roles by 2020. The company is also seeking to have a 50:50 male-to-female gender representation in all entry-level technical programs.

In October 2017, GE announced they would be closing research and development centers in Shanghai, Munich and Rio de Janeiro. The company spent $5 billion on R&D in the last year.

On February 25, 2019, GE sold its diesel locomotive business to Wabtec.

=== CEO ===
As of October 2018, John L. Flannery was replaced by H. Lawrence "Larry" Culp Jr. as chairman and CEO, in a unanimous vote of the GE Board of Directors.

- Charles A. Coffin (1913–1922)
- Owen D. Young (1922–1939, 1942–1945)
- Philip D. Reed (1940–1942, 1945–1958)
- Ralph J. Cordiner (1958–1963)
- Gerald L. Phillippe (1963–1972)
- Fred J. Borch (1967–1972)
- Reginald H. Jones (1972–1981)
- Jack Welch (1981–2001)
- Jeff Immelt (2001–2017)
- John L. Flannery (2017–2018)
- H. Lawrence Culp Jr. (2018–2024)

=== Corporate recognition and rankings ===
In 2011, Fortune ranked GE the sixth-largest firm in the U.S., and the 14th-most profitable. Other rankings for 2011–2012 include the following:

- #18 company for leaders (Fortune)
- #82 green company (Newsweek)
- #91 most admired company (Fortune)
- #19 most innovative company (Fast Company).

In 2012, GE's brand was valued at $28.8 billion. CEO Jeff Immelt had a set of changes in the presentation of the brand commissioned in 2004, after he took the reins as chairman, to unify the diversified businesses of GE. The changes included a new corporate color palette, small modifications to the GE logo, a new customized font (GE Inspira) and a new slogan, "Imagination at work", composed by David Lucas, to replace the slogan "We Bring Good Things to Life" used since 1979. The standard requires many headlines to be lowercased and adds visual "white space" to documents and advertising. The changes were designed by Wolff Olins and are used on GE's marketing, literature, and website. In 2014, a second typeface family was introduced: GE Sans and Serif by Bold Monday, created under art direction by Wolff Olins.

As of 2016, GE had appeared on the Fortune 500 list for 22 years and held the 11th rank. GE was removed from the Dow Jones Industrial Average on June 28, 2018, after the value had dropped below 1% of the index's weight.

== Businesses ==
Ranking in Fortune 500
Year	Rank
1996	7
1997	5
1998	5
1999	5
2000	6
2001	5
2002	6
2003	5
2004	5
2005	5
2006	7
2007	6
2008	6
2009	5
2010	4
2011	6
2012	6
2013	8
2014	9
2015	8
2016	11
2017	13
2018	18
2019	21
2020	33
2021	38
2022	48

GE's primary business divisions were:

- GE Additive
- GE Aerospace
- GE Capital
- GE Digital
- GE HealthCare
- GE Power
- GE Renewable Energy
- GE Research

Through these businesses, GE participated in markets that included the generation, transmission and distribution of electricity (e.g. nuclear, gas and solar), industrial automation, medical imaging equipment, motors, aircraft jet engines, and aviation services. Through GE Commercial Finance, GE Consumer Finance, GE Equipment Services, and GE Insurance, it offered a range of financial services. In addition, General Imaging manufactured GE digital cameras. It had a presence in over 100 countries.

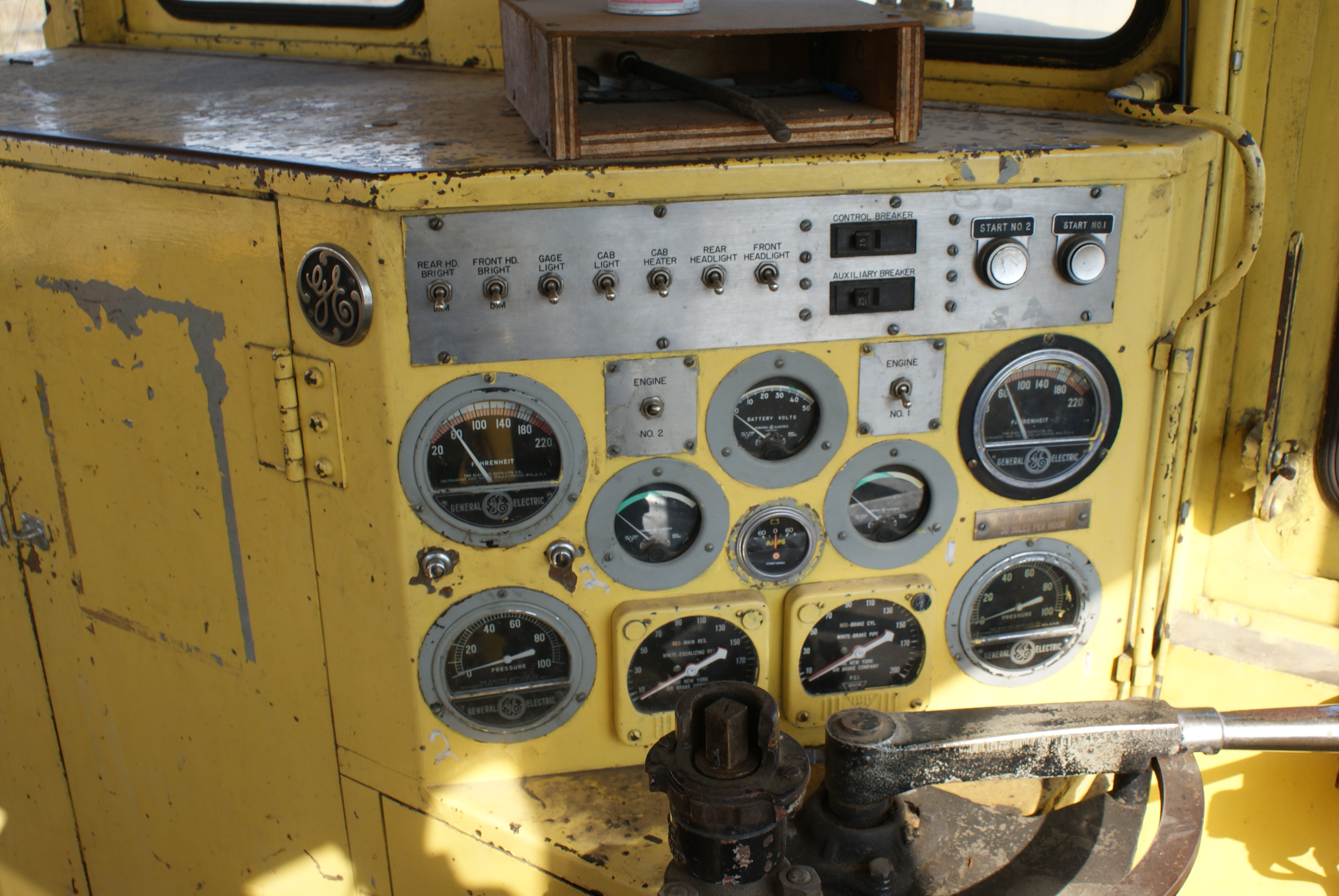
GE gauges to control a railway locomotive at a museum near Saskatoon, Canada

Even though the first wave of conglomerates (such as ITT Corporation, Ling-Temco-Vought, Tenneco, etc.) fell by the wayside by the mid-1980s, in the late 1990s, another wave (consisting of Westinghouse, Tyco, and others) tried and failed to emulate GE's success.

As of August 2015 GE was planning to set up a silicon carbide chip packaging R&D center in coalition with SUNY Polytechnic Institute in Utica, New York. The project was projected to create 470 jobs with the potential to grow to 820 jobs within 10 years.

On September 14, 2015, GE announced the creation of a new unit: GE Digital, which would bring together its software and IT capabilities. The new business unit was headed by Bill Ruh, who joined GE in 2011 from Cisco Systems and had since worked on GE's software efforts.

Morgan Stanley sold a stake in GE HealthCare Technologies for $1.1 billion as part of a deal to swap General Electric Co. debt for GE HealthCare stock.

=== Former divisions ===
GE Industrial was a division providing appliances, lighting, and industrial products; factory automation systems; plastics, silicones, and quartz products; security and sensors technology; and equipment financing, management, and operating services. As of 2007, it had 70,000 employees, generating $17.7 billion in revenue. After some major realignments in late 2007, GE Industrial was organized into two main sub-businesses:

- GE Consumer & Industrial
  - Appliances
  - Electrical distribution
  - Lighting
- GE Enterprise Solutions
  - Digital Energy
  - GE Fanuc Intelligent Platforms
  - Security
  - Sensing & Inspection Technologies

The former GE Plastics division was sold in August 2007 and is now SABIC Innovative Plastics.

On May 4, 2008, it was announced that GE would auction off its appliances business for an expected sale of $5–8 billion. However, this plan fell through as a result of the recession.

The former GE Appliances and Lighting segment was dissolved in 2014 when GE's appliance division attempted to be sold to Electrolux for $5.4 billion, but eventually sold it to Haier in June 2016 due to an antitrust filing against Electrolux. GE Lighting (consumer lighting) and the newly created Current, powered by GE, which deals in commercial LED, solar, EV, and energy storage, became stand-alone businesses within the company, until the sale of the latter to American Industrial Partners in April 2019.

The former GE Transportation division merged with Wabtec on February 25, 2019, leaving GE with a 24.9% holding in Wabtec.

On July 1, 2020, GE Lighting was acquired by Savant Systems and remains headquartered at Nela Park in East Cleveland, Ohio.

== Environmental record ==
=== Pollution ===
Some of GE's activities have given rise to large-scale air and water pollution. Based on data from 2000, researchers at the Political Economy Research Institute listed the corporation as the fourth-largest corporate producer of air pollution in the United States (behind only E. I. Du Pont de Nemours & Co., United States Steel Corp., and ConocoPhillips), with more than 4.4 million pounds per year (2,000 tons) of toxic chemicals released into the air. GE has also been implicated in the creation of toxic waste. According to United States Environmental Protection Agency (EPA) documents, only the United States Government, Honeywell, and Chevron Corporation are responsible for producing more Superfund toxic waste sites.

In 1983, New York State Attorney General Robert Abrams filed suit in the United States District Court for the Northern District of New York to compel GE to pay for the clean-up of what was claimed to be more than 100,000 tons of chemicals dumped from their plant in Waterford, New York, which polluted nearby groundwater and the Hudson River. In 1999, the company agreed to pay a $250 million settlement in connection with claims it polluted the Housatonic River (at Pittsfield, Massachusetts) and other sites with polychlorinated biphenyls (PCBs) and other hazardous substances.

In 2003, acting on concerns that the plan proposed by GE did not "provide for adequate protection of public health and the environment", EPA issued an administrative order for the company to "address cleanup at the GE site" in Rome, Georgia, also contaminated with PCBs.

The nuclear reactors involved in the 2011 crisis at Fukushima I in Japan were GE designs, and the architectural designs were done by Ebasco, formerly owned by GE. Concerns over the design and safety of these reactors were raised as early as 1972, but tsunami danger was not discussed at that time. As of 2014, the same model nuclear reactors designed by GE are operating in the US; however, as of May 31, 2019, the controversial Pilgrim Nuclear Generating Station, in Plymouth, Massachusetts, has been shut down and is in the process of decommission.

==== Pollution of the Hudson River ====
GE heavily contaminated the Hudson River with PCBs between 1947 and 1977. This pollution caused a range of harmful effects to wildlife and people who eat fish from the river. In 1983 EPA declared a 200-mile (320 km) stretch of the river, from Hudson Falls to New York City, to be a Superfund site requiring cleanup. This Superfund site is considered to be one of the largest in the nation. In addition to receiving extensive fines, GE is continuing its sediment removal operations, pursuant to the Superfund orders, in the 21st century.

==== Pollution of the Housatonic River ====
From c. 1932 until 1977, GE polluted the Housatonic River with PCB discharges from its plant at Pittsfield, Massachusetts. EPA designated the Pittsfield plant and several miles of the Housatonic to be a Superfund site in 1997, and ordered GE to remediate the site. Aroclor 1254 and Aroclor 1260, products manufactured by Monsanto, were the principal contaminants that were discharged into the river. The highest concentrations of PCBs in the Housatonic River are found in Woods Pond in Lenox, Massachusetts, just south of Pittsfield, where they have been measured up to 110 mg/kg in the sediment. About 50% of all the PCBs currently in the river are estimated to be retained in the sediment behind Woods Pond dam. This is estimated to be about 11,000 pounds (5,000 kg) of PCBs. Formerly filled oxbows are also polluted. Waterfowl and fish who live in and around the river contain significant levels of PCBs and can present health risks if consumed. In 2020 GE completed remediation and restoration of its 10 manufacturing plant areas within the city of Pittsfield. As of 2023 plans for cleanup of the river south of the city are not finalized.

== Social responsibility ==
=== Environmental initiatives ===
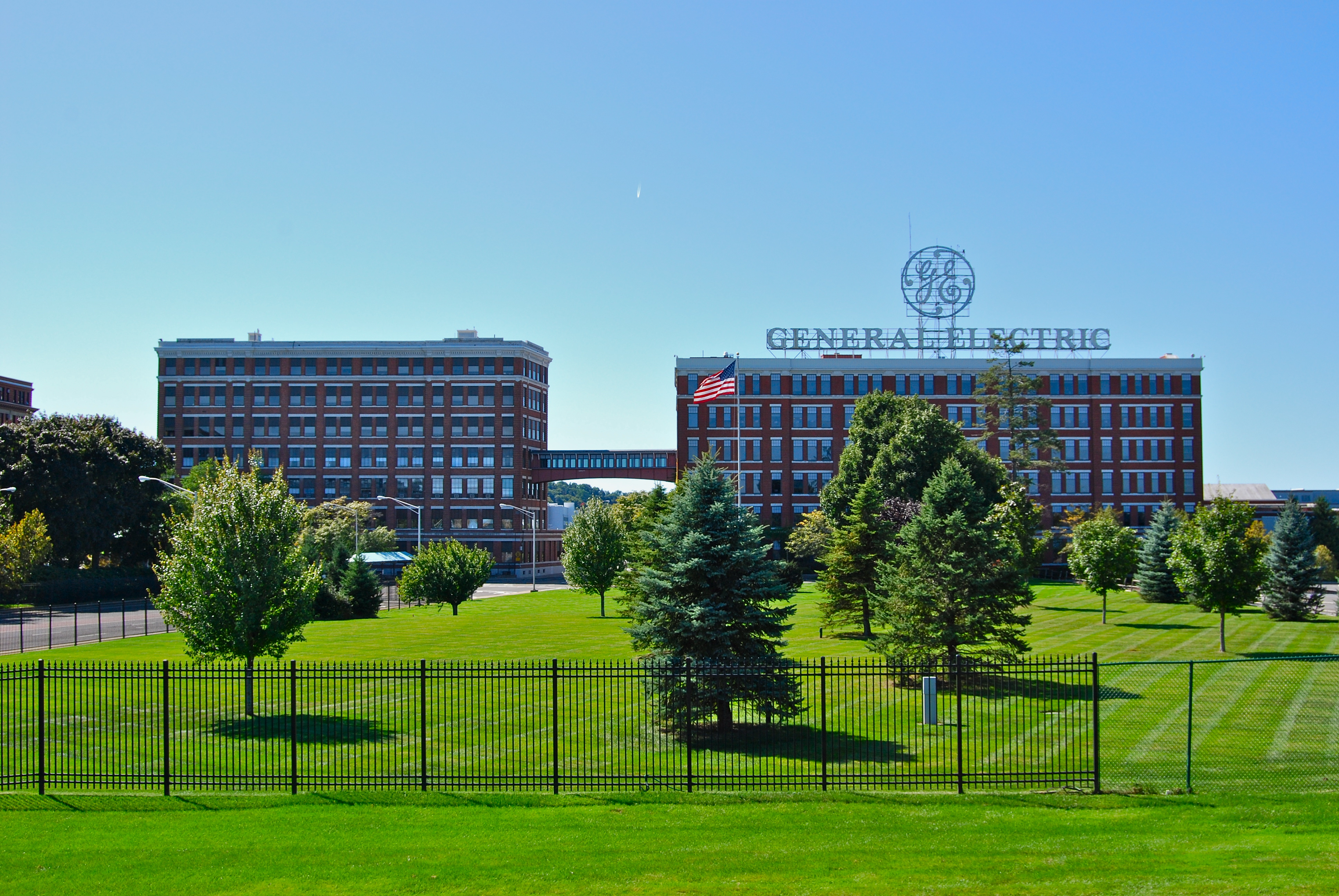
GE facility in Schenectady, New York

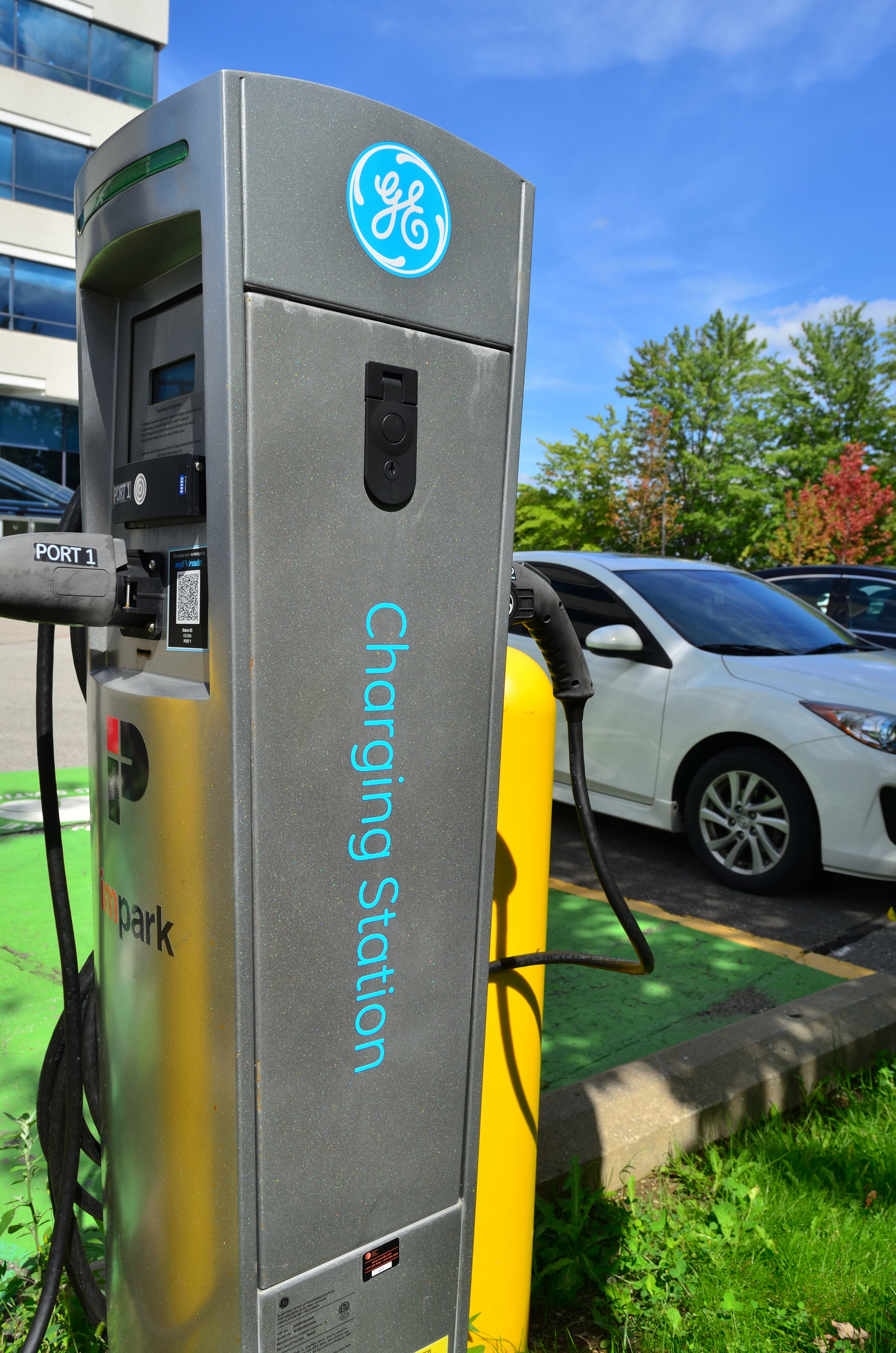
A General Electric EV charging station in North America

The environmental work and research of GE can be seen as early as 1968 with the experimental Delta electric car built by the GE Research and Development Center led by Bruce Laumeister. The electric car led to the production shortly after of the cutting-edge technology of the first commercially produced all-electric Elec-Trak garden tractor, which was manufactured from around 1969 until 1975.

Despite these initiatives, GE has been recognized as a source of PCB pollution in the case of GENERAL ELECTRIC COMPANY v. LOWE'S HOME CENTERS, INC.

On June 6, 2011, GE announced that it had licensed solar thermal technology from California-based eSolar for use in power plants that use both solar and natural gas.

On May 26, 2011, GE unveiled its EV Solar Carport, a carport that incorporates solar panels on its roof, with electric vehicle charging stations under its cover.

In May 2005, GE announced the launch of a program called "Ecomagination", intended, in the words of CEO Jeff Immelt, "to develop tomorrow's solutions such as solar energy, hybrid locomotives, fuel cells, lower-emission aircraft engines, lighter and stronger durable materials, efficient lighting, and water purification technology". The announcement prompted an op-ed piece in The New York Times to observe that, "while General Electric's increased emphasis on clean technology will probably result in improved products and benefit its bottom line, Mr. Immelt's credibility as a spokesman on national environmental policy is fatally flawed because of his company's intransigence in cleaning up its own toxic legacy."

GE has said that it will invest $1.4 billion in clean technology research and development in 2008 as part of its Ecomagination initiative. As of October 2008, the scheme had resulted in 70 green products being brought to market, ranging from halogen lamps to biogas engines. In 2007, GE raised the annual revenue target for its Ecomagination initiative from $20 billion in 2010 to $25 billion following positive market response to its new product lines. In 2010, GE continued to raise its investment by adding $10 billion into Ecomagination over the next five years.

GE Energy's renewable energy business has expanded greatly to keep up with growing U.S. and global demand. Since entering the renewable energy industry in 2002, GE has invested more than $850 million in renewable energy commercialization. In August 2008, it acquired Kelman Ltd, a Northern Ireland-based company specializing in advanced monitoring and diagnostics technologies for transformers used in renewable energy generation and announced an expansion of its business in Northern Ireland in May 2010. In 2009, GE's renewable energy initiatives, which include solar power, wind power and GE Jenbacher gas engines using renewable and non-renewable methane-based gases, employ more than 4,900 people globally and have created more than 10,000 supporting jobs.

GE Energy and Orion New Zealand (Orion) have announced the implementation of the first phase of a GE network management system to help improve power reliability for customers. GE's ENMAC Distribution Management System is the foundation of Orion's initiative. The system of smart grid technologies will significantly improve the network company's ability to manage big network emergencies and help it restore power faster when outages occur.

In June 2018, GE Volunteers, an internal group of GE employees, along with the Malaysian Nature Society, transplanted more than 270 plants from the Taman Tugu forest reserve so that they may be replanted in a forest trail that is under construction.

=== Educational initiatives ===
GE Healthcare is collaborating with the Wayne State University School of Medicine and the Medical University of South Carolina to offer an integrated radiology curriculum during their respective MD Programs led by investigators of the Advanced Diagnostic Ultrasound in Microgravity study. GE has donated over one million dollars of Logiq E Ultrasound equipment to these two institutions.

=== Marketing initiatives ===
Between September 2011 and April 2013, GE ran a content marketing campaign dedicated to telling the stories of "innovators—people who are reshaping the world through act or invention". The initiative included 30 3-minute films from leading documentary film directors (Albert Maysles, Jessica Yu, Leslie Iwerks, Steve James, Alex Gibney, Lixin Fan, Gary Hustwit and others), and a user-generated competition that received over 600 submissions, out of which 20 finalists were chosen.

Short Films, Big Ideas was launched at the 2011 Toronto International Film Festival in partnership with cinelan. Stories included breakthroughs in Slingshot (water vapor distillation system), cancer research, energy production, pain management, and food access. Each of the 30 films received world premiere screenings at a major international film festival, including the Sundance Film Festival and the Tribeca Film Festival. The winning amateur director film, The Cyborg Foundation, was awarded a US$100,000 prize at the 2013 Sundance Film Festival. According to GE, the campaign garnered more than 1.5 billion total media impressions, 14 million online views, and was seen in 156 countries.

In January 2017, GE signed an estimated $7 million deal with the Boston Celtics to have its corporate logo put on the NBA team's jersey.

=== Charity ===
On March 3, 2022, GE published an international memo pledging to donate $4.5 million to Ukraine amid the 2022 Russian invasion of Ukraine. According to the memo, $4 million will be used for medical equipment, $400,000 for emergency cash for refugees, and $100,000 will go to Airlink, an NGO that helps communities in crisis.

== Political affiliation ==
GE has designed social programs, supported civil rights organizations, and funded minority education programs.

In the 1950s, the company sponsored the series General Electric Theater, hosted by Ronald Reagan, which saw Reagan's transition from movies to television, and launched him on the lecture circuit, thus beginning his political career.

== Notable appearances in media ==
In the early 1950s, Kurt Vonnegut was a writer for GE. A number of his novels and stories (notably Cat's Cradle and Player Piano) refer to the fictional city of Ilium, which appears to be loosely based on Schenectady, New York. The Ilium Works is the setting for the short story "Deer in the Works".

In 1981, GE won a Clio award for its 30 Soft White Light Bulbs commercial, We Bring Good Things to Life. The slogan "We Bring Good Things to Life" was created by Phil Dusenberry at the ad agency BBDO.

GE was the primary focus of a 1991 short subject Academy Award-winning documentary, Deadly Deception: General Electric, Nuclear Weapons, and Our Environment, that juxtaposed GE's "We Bring Good Things To Life" commercials with the true stories of workers and neighbors whose lives have been affected by the company's activities involving nuclear weapons.

GE was frequently mentioned and parodied in the NBC comedy sitcom 30 Rock from 2006 to 2013. Former General Electric CEO Jack Welch even cameoed as himself, appearing in the season four episode "Future Husband". The episode is a satirical reference to the real-world acquisition of NBCUniversal from General Electric by Comcast in November 2009.

In 2013, GE received a National Jefferson Award for Outstanding Service by a Major Corporation.

== Branding ==
The General Electric logo has a blue circle with a white outline. It has four curved white lines which "suggest the blades of a fan". In the center of the circle is the cursive letters "GE". The logo was designed by Arthur L. Rich in 1899 and trademarked in 1900. Its design has changed little throughout the company's history. The logo is officially known as the Monogram but is also known by some as "the meatball".

== See also ==
- GE Technology Infrastructure
- Knolls Atomic Power Laboratory
- Phoebus cartel
- Top 100 US Federal Contractors
