= Timeline of General Electric =

General Electric has a long history, involving numerous mergers, acquisitions, and divestitures.

== 1876-1925 ==
Date	Event
1876	Thomas Edison opens a new laboratory in Menlo Park, New Jersey, USA
1882	Thomson-Houston Electric Company formed by Elihu Thomson and Edwin Houston, later moving from New Britain, Connecticut, to Lynn, Massachusetts, in 1883.
1890	Four companies (Edison Lamp Company, Edison Machine Works, and Bergmann & Company with the patent-holding company, Edison Electric Light Company) in various Tri-state area locations holding Edison's various interests merge as Edison General Electric Company
1890	Edison General Electric Company acquires the Sprague Electric Railway and Motor Company.
1893	Edison sells his shares in General Electric

GE timeline

Date	Event
1892	Edison General Electric and Thomson-Houston merge to become The General Electric Company, with Charles A. Coffin as first president, with headquarters in Schenectady, New York (later moved to New York City).
1893	Compagnie Française Thomson-Houston, a sister company to General Electric which would become Thomson SA, formed in Paris
1894	British Thomson-Houston, a subsidiary, formed in Rugby, Warwickshire, England
1896	General Electric made a component of the Dow Jones Industrial Average
1905	The Electric Bond and Share Co., the forerunner of GE Commercial Finance is formed, with the goal of providing financing to small utility companies
1911	National Electric Lamp Association (NELA) is absorbed into General Electric's existing lighting business and GE establishes its lighting division headquarters at Nela Park, the world's first industrial park, in East Cleveland, Ohio
1912	General Electric begins using phenolic resins to mold plastic parts
1913	Charles A. Coffin becomes the first Chairman of General Electric
1913	Edwin Rice becomes President, replacing Charles A. Coffin
1917	General Electric acquires synchronous electric clock manufacturer Telechron
1918	Trumbull Electric Company, headquartered in Plainville, Connecticut, is acquired. Trumbull Electric Manufactory Co. produced electrical supply parts including porcelain fixtures, switchboards and panels.
1919	Radio Corporation of America (RCA) formed by General Electric and American Telephone & Telegraph
1922	Owen Young becomes chairman, replacing Charles A. Coffin

== 1926-1975 ==
Date	Event
1930	General Electric creates its Plastics Department to research and produce advanced plastics
1932	GE Credit Corporation, which evolves into GE Consumer Finance, is founded to allow families to purchase General Electric appliances on credit
1935	General Electric markets the first electric garbage disposal, the Disposall (disputed by InSinkErator)
1940	Philip D. Reed replaces Owen Young as Chairman
1942	Owen Young returns as chairman, replacing Philip D. Reed
1942	General Electric develops the first American jet engine
1945	Philip D. Reed becomes chairman, replacing Owen Young
1945	General Electric acquires Ken-Rad Tube Manufacturing Corporation, headquartered in Owensboro, Kentucky, and designates the Ken-Rad's plants located in Owensboro and Bowling Green, Kentucky, Tell City and Huntingburg, Indiana, as its primary vacuum tube manufacturing facilities
1949	GE Armament Division test-fires the M61 Vulcan rotary cannon
1953	Lexan accidentally developed by a GE Plastics scientist while searching for a new wire coating
1955	GE Research Laboratory announces the ability to create the first artificial diamonds, primarily for industrial use
1958	Ralph J. Cordiner becomes Chairman & CEO, replacing Philip D. Reed
1962	General Electric scientist Robert N. Hall invents the solid state laser
1963	Gerald L. Phillippe becomes chairman, replacing Ralph J. Cordiner
1964	General Electric sponsors Carousel of Progress at the 1964 New York World's Fair and continues sponsorship after it is moved to Disneyland from 1967 to 1973, then to Magic Kingdom (1975–1985)
1967	Fred J. Borch becomes Chairman & CEO, replacing Gerald L. Phillippe
1970	Computer systems division sold to Honeywell
1971	CFM International is formed with partner SNECMA for the purpose of producing medium-sized civil turbofan
1972	Reginald Jones becomes chairman and CEO, replacing Fred J. Borch
1974	GE moves its headquarters to Fairfield, Connecticut, from New York City.

== 1976-2024 ==
Date	Event
1981	Jack Welch whose management style would leave a lasting effect upon General Electric and corporate America, replaces Reginald Jones as CEO
1982	CFM International's CFM56 is introduced; The CFM56 would go on to dominate the engine market for short haul airliner
1983	General Electric begins sponsoring Horizons at EPCOT Center which ends in 1993
1984	GE spins off its commercial computer graphics products and services Genigraphics Operation to the Genigraphics Corporation
1984	GE acquires Employers Reinsurance Corporation for $1 billion
1985	GEnie, one of the pioneering online services, was developed using extra processor cycles on General Electric Information Services mainframes
1986	General Electric re-acquires RCA, primarily for the NBC television network and sells the remaining components to Thomson—along with General Electric's consumer electronics division— and Bertelsmann. GE also acquired Kidder-Peabody as part of GE Capital. The company starts sponsoring The McLaughlin Group, which lasted 16 years.
1987	GE closed down air conditioner plant in Appliance Park in Louisville, Kentucky and sold their room air conditioner and rotary compressor plant in Columbia, Tennessee, to Fedders. GE also sold the residential and commercial air conditioner plant in Tyler, Texas to Trane.
1988	General Electric begins sponsorship of IllumiNations, a series of fireworks displays, at EPCOT Center which continues until 1998
1989	The Consumer News and Business Channel, or CNBC, is formed to provide business news to cable television subscribers
1992	GE Power controls acquires the company Agut S.A in Spain.
1993	GE Aerospace Division sold to Martin Marietta, now Lockheed Martin
1996	MSNBC is formed with partner Microsoft, to compete with the Cable News Network
1996	GEnie is sold to Yovelle, now part of IDT Corp.
1996	General Electric sponsors the Main Street Electrical Parade for the farewell season at Disneyland
1999	Harkening back to the Easy-Bake Oven, General Electric introduces the Advantium oven, which uses halogen lights to cook food
1999	Montgomery Ward exits Chapter 11 bankruptcy protection, and becomes a subsidiary of GE Capital, a major creditor
1999	GEnie, General Electric's nascent Internet Service Provider, is shut down.
2000	Montgomery Ward folded by GE Capital due to declining sales
2001	General Electric and Honeywell agree to merge, however it is blocked by European Union M&A chief Mario Monti.
2001	Jeffrey Immelt becomes CEO, replacing Jack Welch
2001	NBC acquires Telemundo, one of the leading Spanish language television networks
2002	GE stops sponsoring the public television program The McLaughlin Group after 16 years.
2002	The finance committee of the board is dissolved
2003	GE Healthcare acquires Instrumentarium.
2003	GE Capital acquires Transamerica Finance from AEGON, who retained the rest of Transamerica Corporation
2004	NBC acquires the entertainment assets of Vivendi Universal, excluding Universal Music and forms NBC Universal, of which General Electric owns 80%
2004	GE Healthcare acquires Amersham plc
2004	GE Capital acquires Dillard's credit card unit for US$1.25 billion
2004	GE sells 60% stake in GE Capital International Services (GECIS) to private equity companies, Oak Hill Capital Partners and General Atlantic, for $500 million
2004	Genworth Financial formed from General Electric's life and mortgage insurance assets
2004	GE Security acquires InVision Technologies, a leading manufacturer of airport security equipment. On July 1, 2009, the European Union approves the sale of 81 percent of GE's airport security and biometrics division to French company Safran.
2005	GE Commercial Finance acquires the financial assets of Bombardier, a Canadian aircraft manufacturer for US$1.4 billion
2006	GE Healthcare acquires IDX Systems, a medical software firm, for US$1.2 billion
2006	GE Advanced Materials division is sold to Apollo Management for US$3.8 billion
2006	GE Water & Process Technologies acquires Zenon Environmental Systems for $758 million
2006	GE Money buys Superbank's $500 million lending portfolio
2007	GE Consumer & Industrial acquires Microwave Data Systems for US$600 million
2007	GE-Aviation acquires Smiths Aerospace for £2.4 billion
2007	GE Oil & Gas acquires Vetco Gray for US$1.9 billion.
2007	GE Plastics is sold to SABIC for US$11.6 billion.
2008	GE Oil & Gas acquires Hydril Pressure & Control for US$1.12 billion from Tenaris, who retains possession of Hydril Premium Connections.
2008	GE Co. acquires Vital Signs Inc. for US$860 million
2009	GE buys Vivendi's stake in NBC Universal and sell a controlling interest of the company to Comcast, with GE retaining a 49 percent interest in the joint venture
2009	GE acquires Norway-based turbine manufacturer ScanWind.
2010	GE enters negotiations with Comcast Corporation to sell the NBC Universal unit; Clearance by the FCC and US Attorney General are required
2011	GE completes sale of NBC Universal with Comcast. GE still owns 49% of The Venture
2013	GE sells the remaining part of NBC Universal to Comcast.
2013	GE sells Vital Signs division Carefusion for 500M USD.
2014	GE agreed to sell their appliance business to Electrolux but the deal was not completed.
2015	Due to antitrust issues, GE cancels the appliance business deal with Electrolux after strong oppositions from antitrust regulators
2015	GE completes Alstom Power acquisition.
2016	GE agreed to sell its appliance business to Qingdao Haier for $5.4 billion including the 48.4% of shares it held in Mabe, a Mexican appliance maker
2016	GE acquires ShipExpress
2016	General Electric moved their global headquarters from Fairfield, Connecticut, to the South Boston Waterfront in August 2016.
2016	GE Digital acquires ServiceMax
2017	GE acquires Baker Hughes and merges it with GE Oil and Gas to form Baker Hughes a GE Company.
2018	S&P Dow Jones Indices announces that another company will replace General Electric Co. (NYSE:GE) in the Dow Jones Industrial Average (DJIA) effective prior to the open of trading on June 26.
2019	GE sells GE Transportation to Wabtec and terminates ownership of former said company after 112 years of ownership.
2021	GE announces split of company into three separate concerns—GE HealthCare, GE Vernova, and GE Aerospace—with the healthcare and energy (Vernova) divisions being spun off and the company pivoting to aviation by rebranding as GE Aerospace.
2023	GE completes spin-off of GE HealthCare
2024	GE completes spin-off of GE Vernova. The company is now known as GE Aerospace and ceases to exist as a conglomerate, the General Electric Company name retired after 130 years.
