= Department of Mechanical Engineering, Imperial College London =

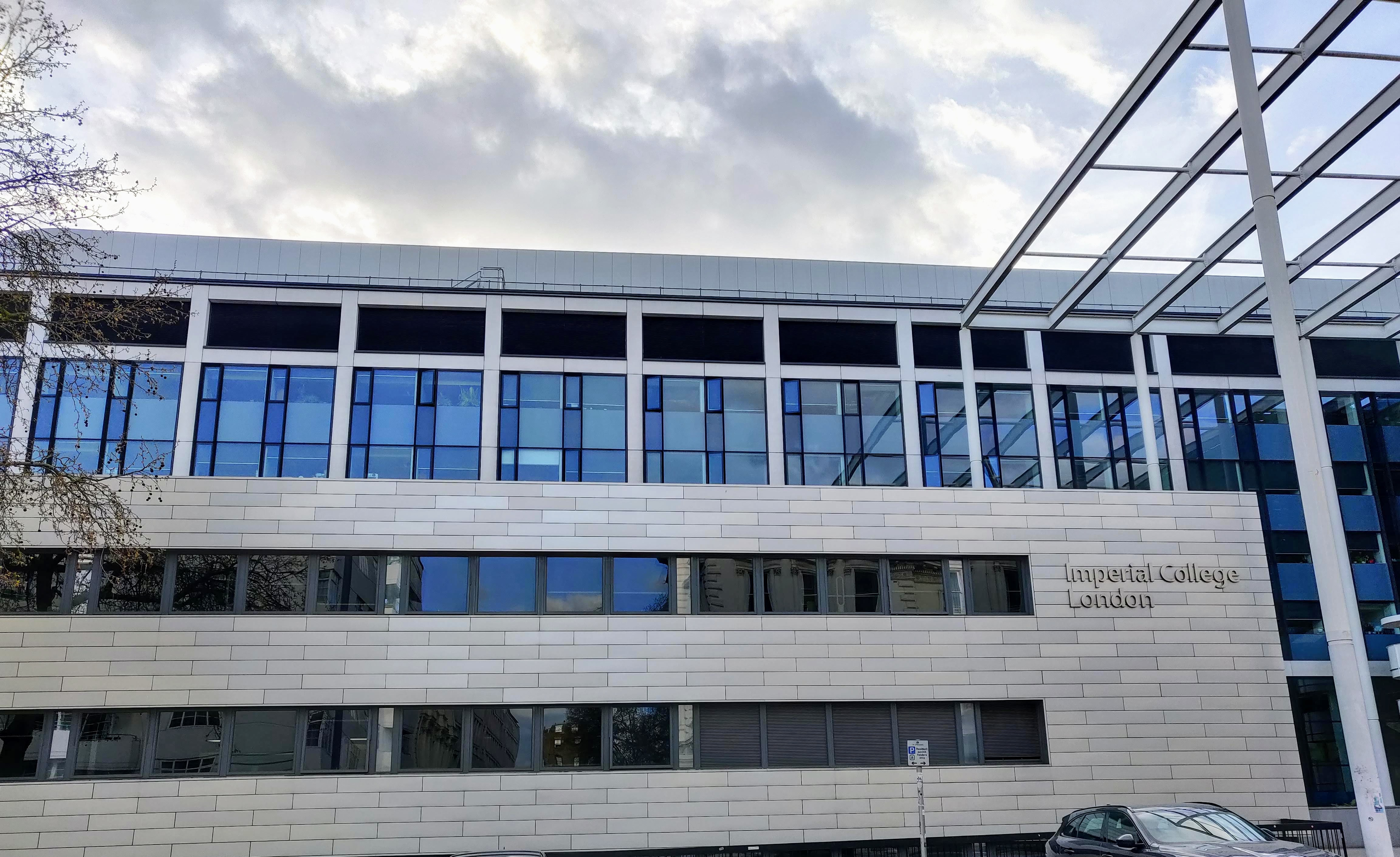
- The City & Guilds Building from Exhibition Road
- Established: 1884
- Head of Department: Professor Mike Lowe
- Faculty: Imperial College Faculty of Engineering
- Staff: 44
- Students: 866
- Location: Exhibition Road, London, United Kingdom; 51.498524°N 0.174600°W
- Campus: South Kensington
- Website: www.imperial.ac.uk/mechanical-engineering
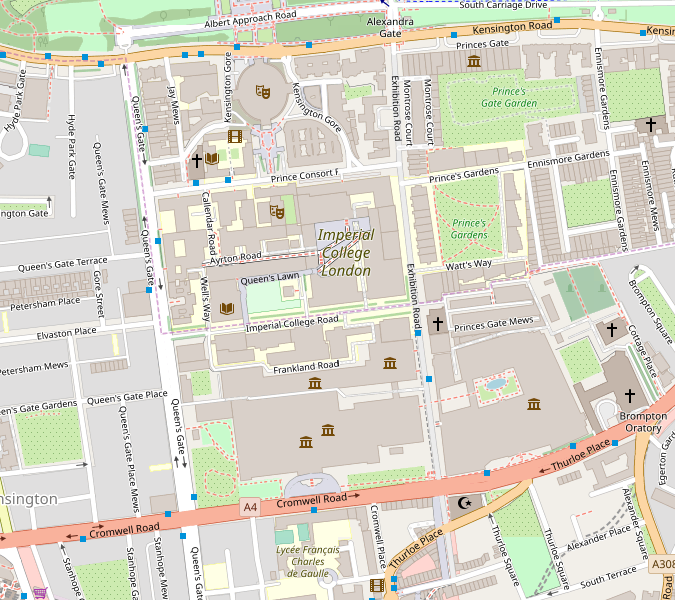
- Location within Albertopolis, South Kensington

The Department of Mechanical Engineering is an academic department of the Faculty of Engineering at Imperial College London in England, United Kingdom.

It is located at the City & Guilds Building at the South Kensington campus. The department has around 45 faculty members, 600 undergraduates, and 250 postgraduate students. The department ranks 8th in the QS World University Rankings's 2018 table.

== History ==
The origins of the department lie in the 1884 appointment of William Unwin as professor of civil and mechanical engineering at the Central Institution of the City & Guilds of London Institute, later the City & Guilds College, one of the predecessors to Imperial College. In 1904, the department was taken over by William Dalby. The department's main building was renamed the City & Guilds Building in 2013 as a reference to the historical association of the department of the college, and in 2018 a complete refurbishment of the building was completed.

== Academics ==
=== Study ===
==== Undergraduate ====
The undergraduate program at the department is a 4-year integrated course leading to a master's degree in mechanical engineering, including an option to study a year abroad, or take an extra year in industry. All students graduating with the MEng degree also automatically receive an Associateship of the City and Guilds of London Institute.

==== Postgraduate ====
The department offers a 12-month taught postgraduate programme leading to a MSc, as well as taking on doctor's students studying for a PhD. All postgraduate students of the department are also eligible for the Diploma of Imperial College, DIC, alongside their standard degree when graduating.

=== Rankings ===
The college ranks 10th in the world for engineering on the Times Higher Education subject rankings, and the department in particular ranks 8th in the world in the 2018 QS world subject rankings. Domestically, the department ranks 2nd on the Complete University Guide's 2019 mechanical engineering table after Cambridge, and 1st on The Guardian's 2019 mechanical engineering university subject rankings.

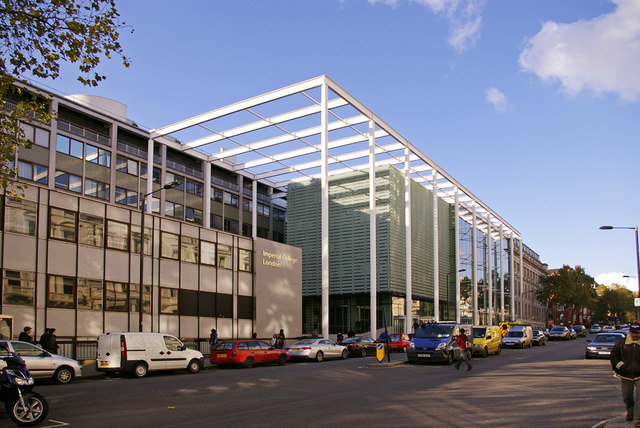
The Mechanical Engineering Building before refurbishment

=== Research ===
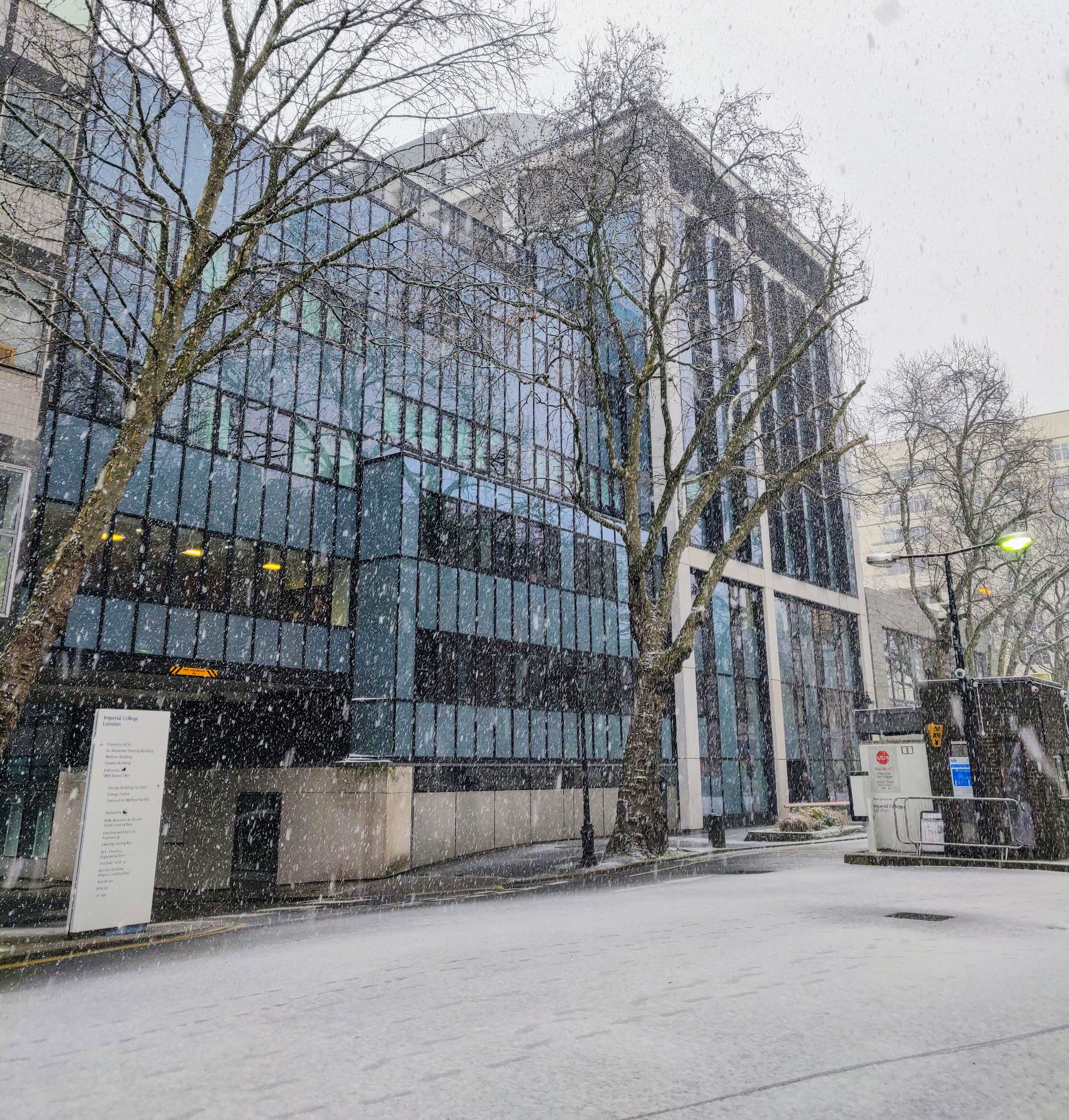
City and Guilds Building in the snow

The department's research is conducted by research groups which have a particular academic focus. These research groups are organized by the department into different divisions which centre around fields of study:

Applied mechanics

- Dynamics - Aeroelasticity and structural dynamics in turbomachinery
- Medical engineering - Human skeletal and muscular structure
- Non-destructive evaluation - Inspecting and investigation through non destructive processes
- Nuclear engineering - Nuclear thermal hydraulics and reactor physics
- Tribology - Lubrication and friction

Thermofluids

- The Aimee Morgans lab, Professor Aimee Morgans - Thermo-acoustic instabilities and vehicular aerodynamic drag
- The Hazelab group, Professor Guillermo Rein - Heat and fire science
- Turbocharger testing and research group, Professor Ricardo Martinez-Botas - Exhaust gas energy recovery and turbocharging

Mechanics of materials

- Metal-forming technologies group, Dr Liliang Wang - Metal-forming processes
- Materials Modelling, Dr Daniel Balint - Advanced modelling of materials
- Adhesion and Adhesives, Dr Bamber Blackman - Joining technologies and adhesive bonding
- Nanomaterials, Dr Ambrose Taylor - Material microstructure and nanoparticle-modified materials
- Soft Solids, Professor Maria Charalambides - Deformation and fracture of soft polymers and other soft materials
- Structural Applications
- Component Structural Integrity, Professor Kamran Nikbin - Examining the durability and performance of materials subjected to a range of conditions, and investigating this in relation to safety
- Electrochemical Science and Engineering, Dr Greg Offer - Applications of electrochemical devices to mobile and stationary power
- Novel Manufacture for Performance, Dr Paul Hooper

The department also runs academic centres, some in partnership with industry, including the Vibration University Technology Centre, the AVIC Centre for Structural Design and Manufacture, and the BIAM-Imperial Centre for Materials Characterisation, Processing and Modelling.

== People ==
- William Dalby, former head of department
- William Unwin, former head of department
