= Arc lamp =

Lamp that produces light by an electric arc

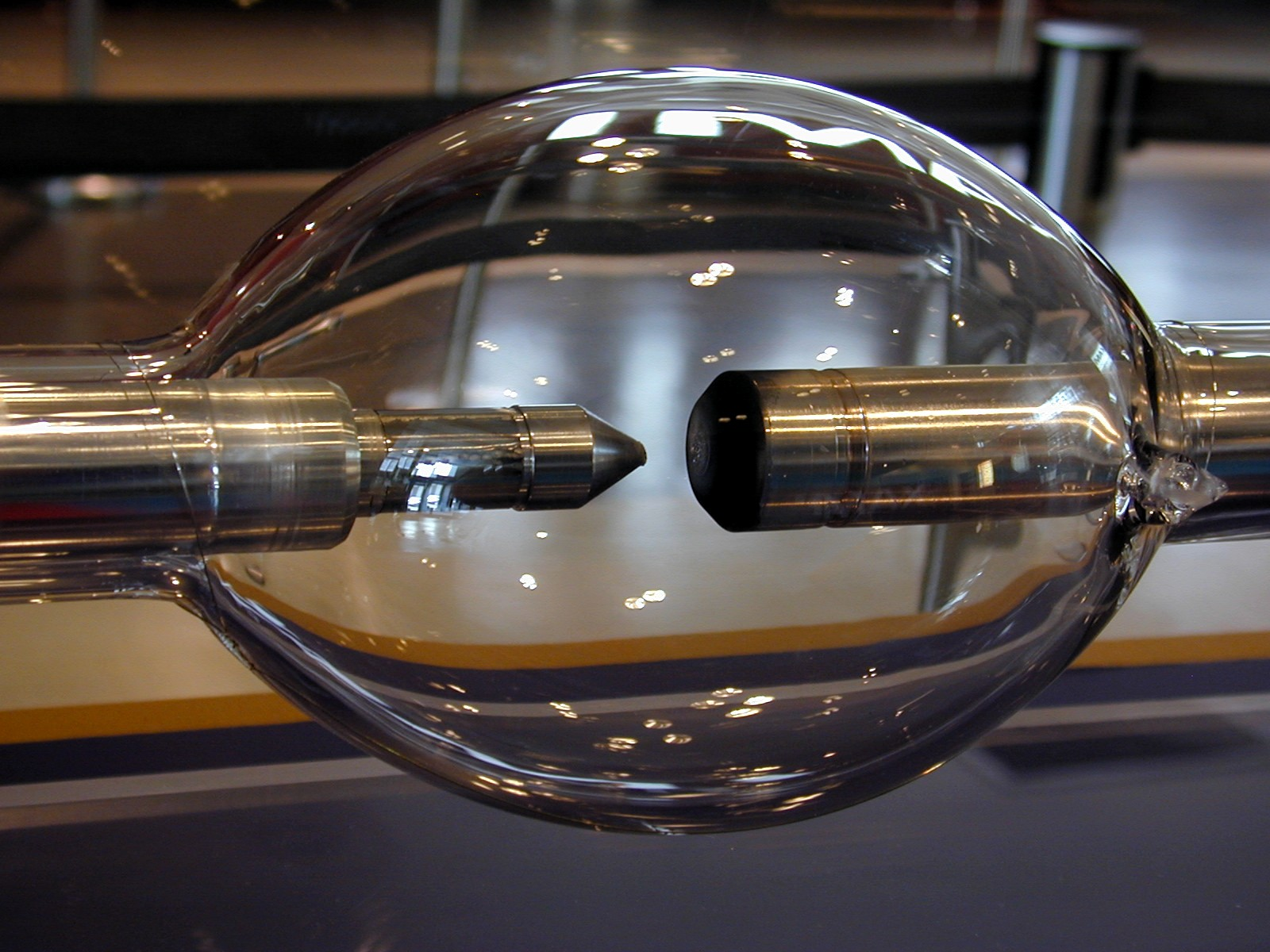
The 15 kW xenon short-arc lamp used in the IMAX projection system.

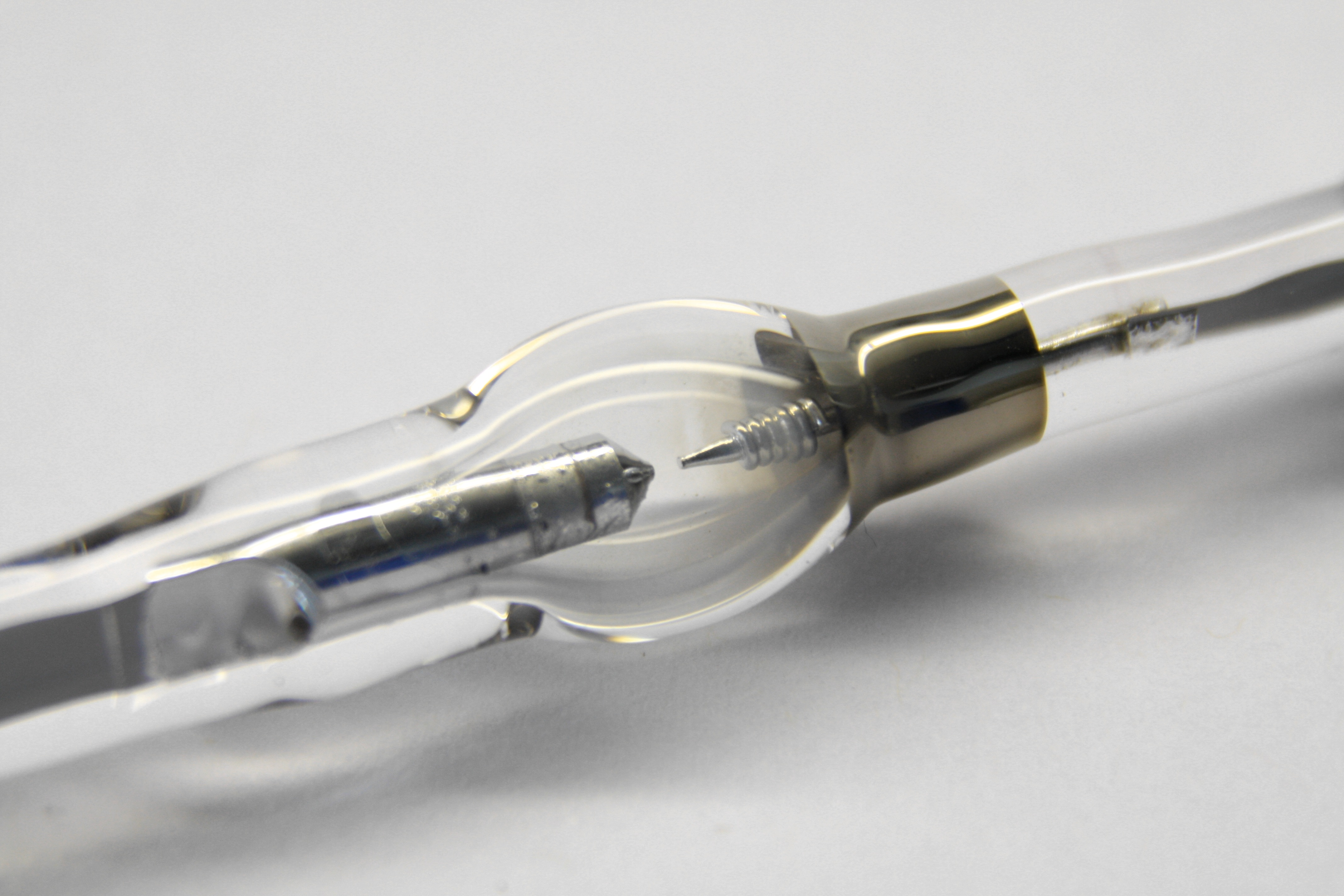
A mercury arc lamp from a fluorescence microscope.

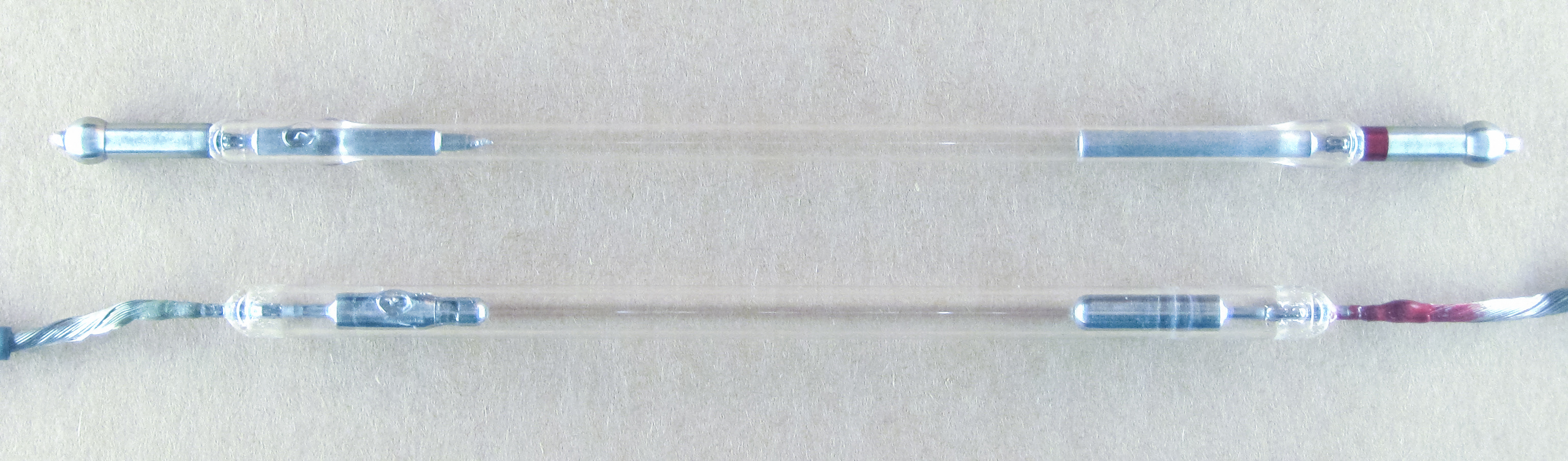
A krypton long arc lamp (top) is shown above a xenon flashtube. The two lamps, used for laser pumping, are very different in the shape of the electrodes, in particular, the cathode (on the left).

An arc lamp or arc light is a lamp that produces light by an electric arc (also called a voltaic arc).

The carbon arc light, which consists of an arc between carbon electrodes in air, invented by Humphry Davy in the first decade of the 1800s, was the first practical electric light. It was widely used starting in the 1870s for street and large building lighting until it was superseded by the incandescent light in the early 20th century. It continued in use in more specialized applications where a high intensity point light source was needed, such as searchlights and movie projectors until after World War II. The carbon arc lamp is now obsolete for most of these purposes, but it is still used as a source of high intensity ultraviolet light.

The term is now used for gas discharge lamps, which produce light by an arc between metal electrodes through a gas in a glass bulb. The common fluorescent lamp is a low-pressure mercury arc lamp. The xenon arc lamp, which produces a high intensity white light, is now used in many of the applications which formerly used the carbon arc, such as movie projectors and searchlights.

== Operation ==
An arc is the discharge that occurs when a gas is ionized. A high voltage is pulsed across the lamp to "ignite" or "strike" the arc, after which the discharge can be maintained at a lower voltage. The "strike" requires an electrical circuit with an igniter and a ballast. The ballast is wired in series with the lamp and performs two functions.

When the power is first switched on, the igniter/starter (which is wired in parallel across the lamp) sets up a small current through the ballast and starter. This creates a small magnetic field within the ballast windings. A moment later the starter interrupts the current flow through the ballast, which has a high inductance and therefore tries to maintain the current flow (the ballast opposes any change in current through it); but it cannot, as there is no longer a 'circuit'. As a result, a very high voltage appears across the ballast momentarily, to which the lamp is connected; therefore the lamp receives this high voltage across it which 'strikes' the arc within the tube/lamp. The circuit will repeat this action until the lamp is ionized enough to sustain the arc.

When the lamp sustains the arc, the ballast performs its second function, to limit the current to that needed to operate the lamp. The lamp, ballast, and igniter are rating-matched to each other; these parts must be replaced with the same rating as the failed component or the lamp will not work.

The color of the light emitted by the lamp changes as its electrical characteristics change with temperature and time. Lightning is a similar principle where the atmosphere is ionized by the high potential difference (voltage) between earth and storm clouds.

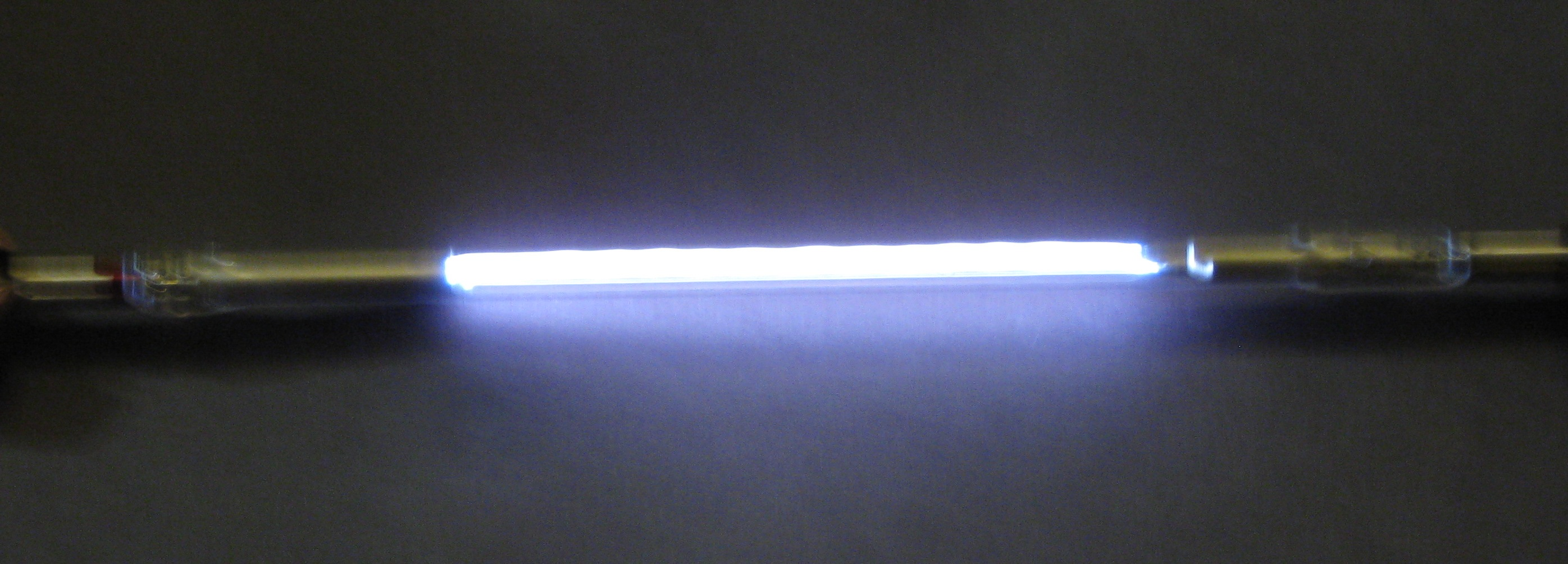
A krypton arc lamp during operation.

The temperature of the arc in an arc lamp can reach several thousand degrees Celsius. The outer glass envelope can reach 500 degrees Celsius, therefore before servicing one must ensure the bulb has cooled sufficiently to handle. Often, if these types of lamps are turned off or lose their power supply, one cannot restrike the lamp again for several minutes (called cold restrike lamps). However, some lamps (mainly fluorescent tubes/energy saving lamps) can be restruck as soon as they are turned off (called hot restrike lamps).

The Vortek water-wall plasma arc lamp, invented in 1975 by David Camm and Roy Nodwell at the University of British Columbia, Vancouver, Canada, made the Guinness Book of World Records in 1986 and 1993 as the most powerful continuously burning light source at over 300 kW or 1.2 million candle power.

== Carbon arc lamp ==
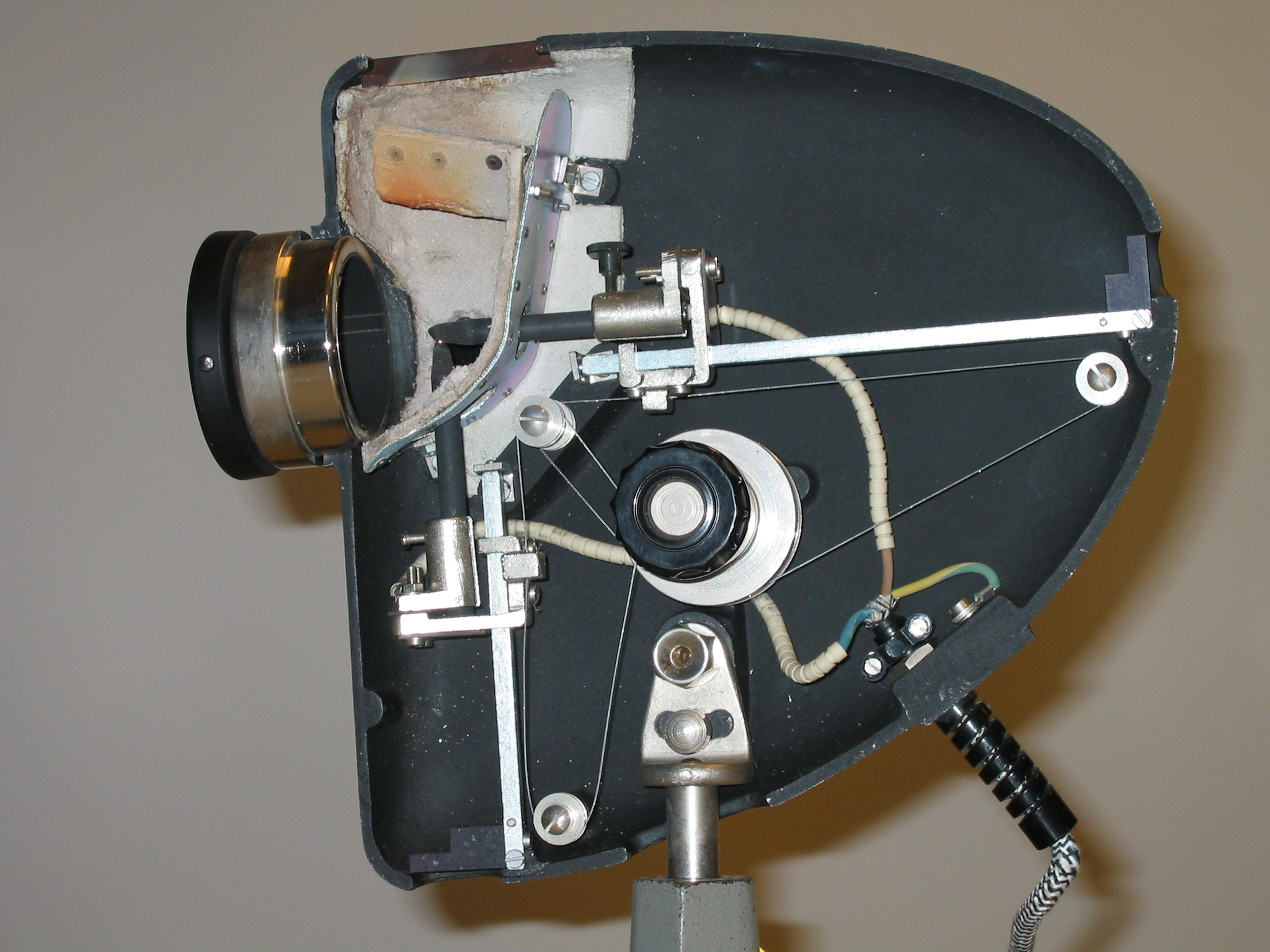
A carbon arc lamp, cover removed, on the point of ignition. This model requires manual adjustment of the electrodes

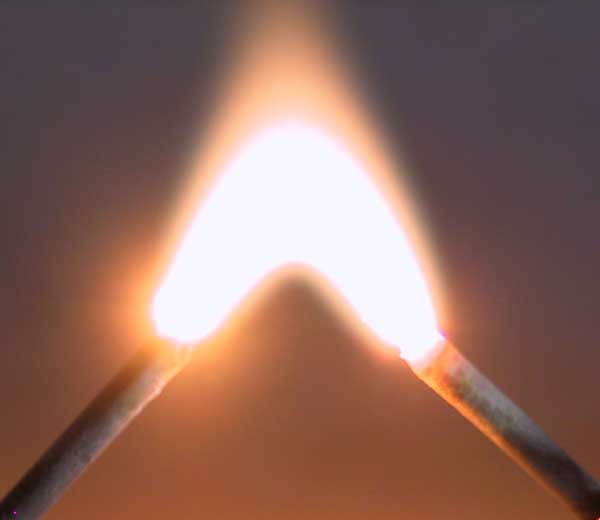
An electric arc, demonstrating the “arch” effect.

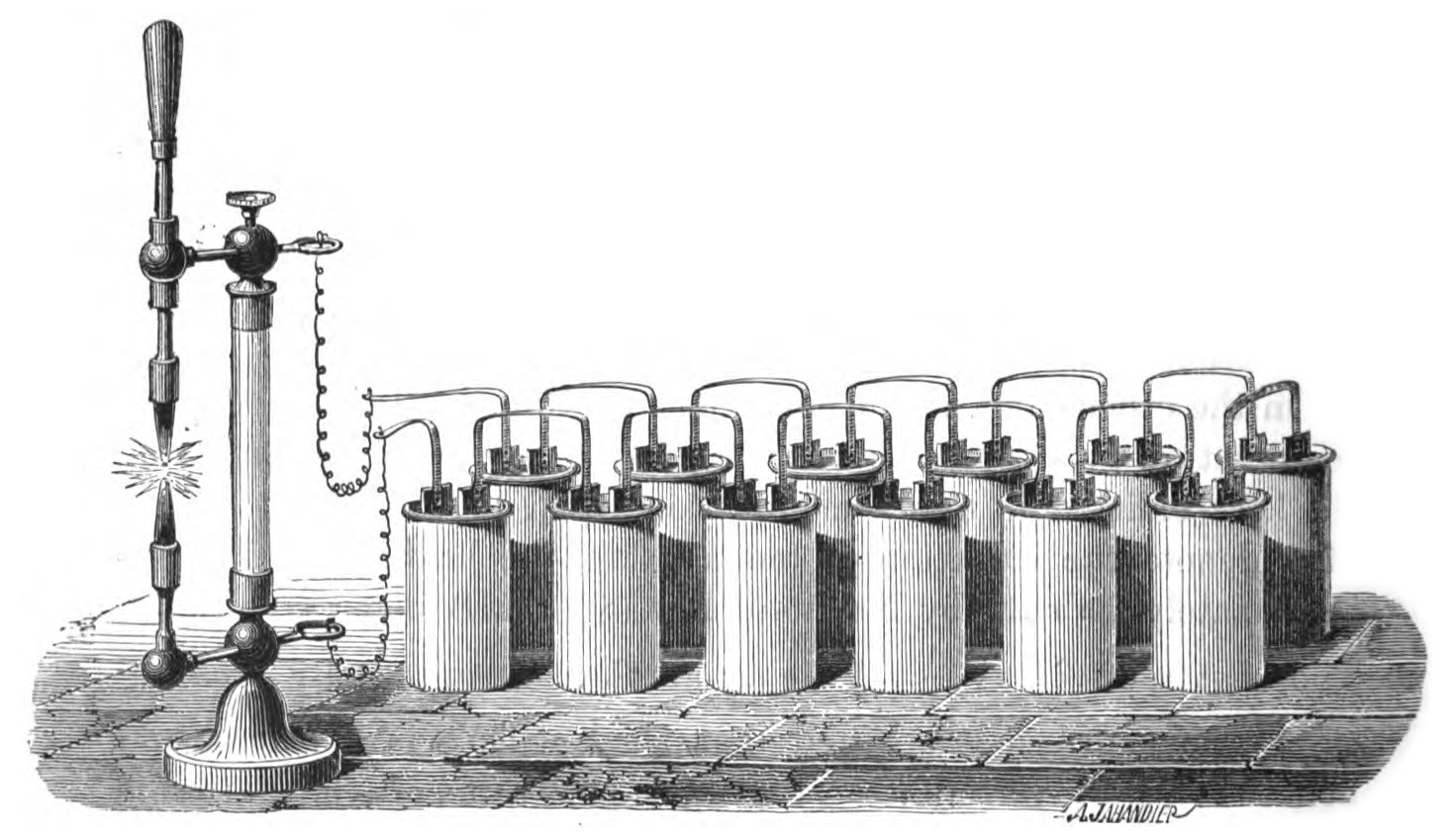
Early experimental carbon arc light powered by liquid batteries, similar to Davy's

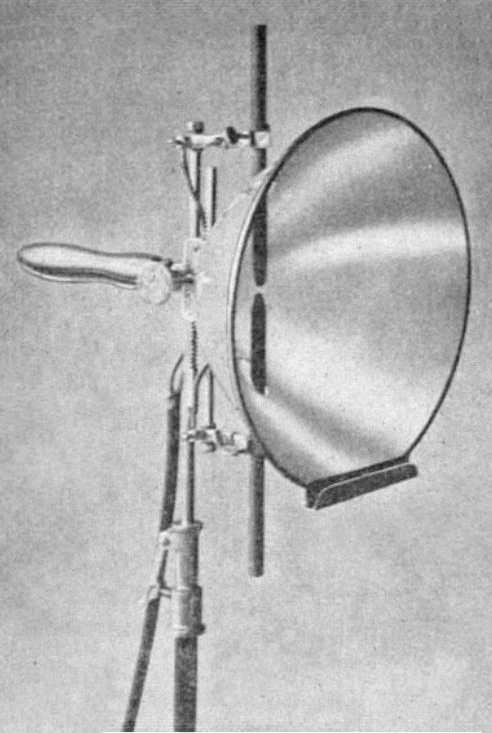
Medical carbon arc lamp used to treat skin conditions, 1909

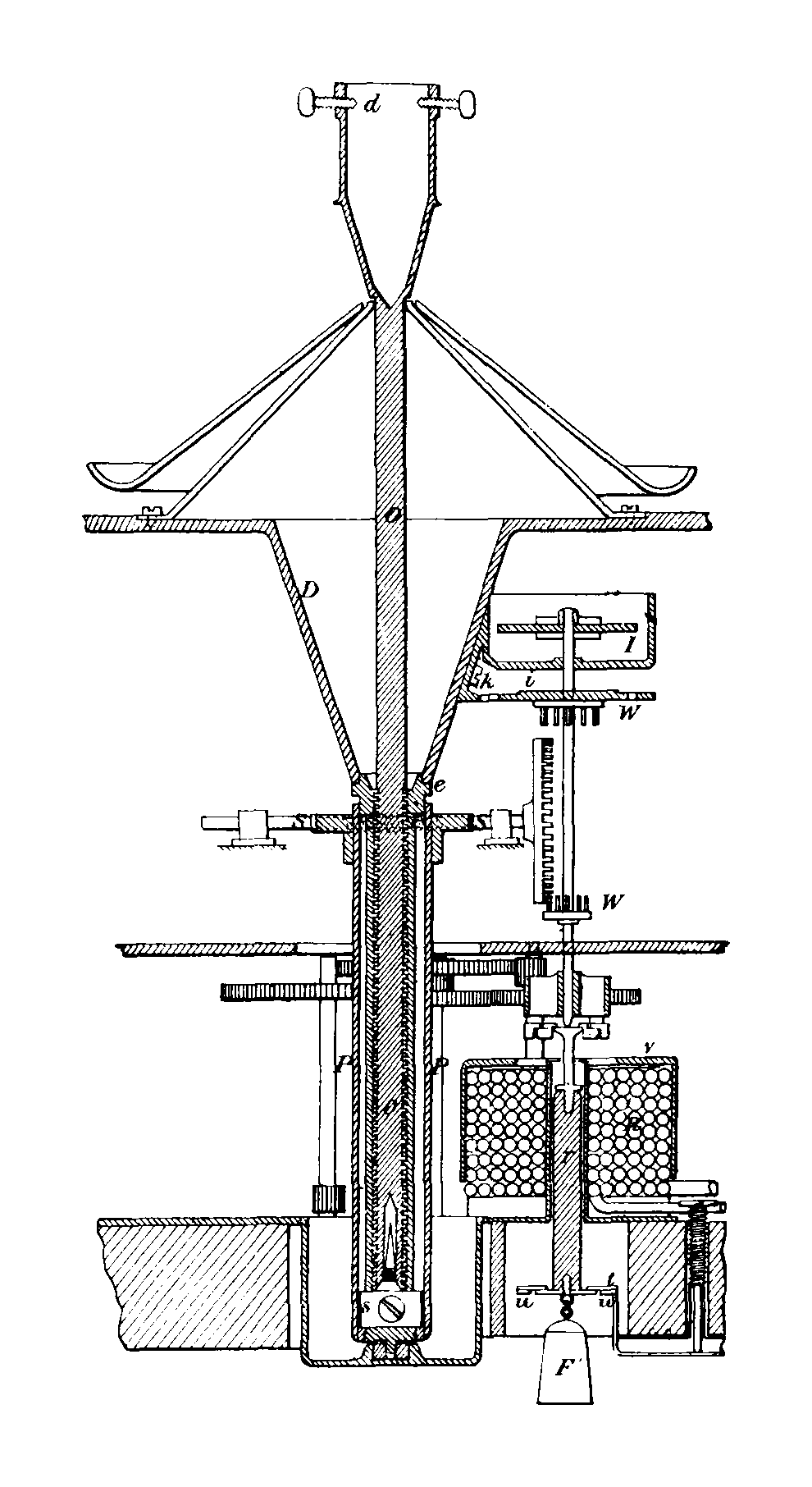
Self-regulating arc lamp proposed by William Edwards Staite and William Petrie in 1847

In a carbon arc lamp, the electrodes are carbon rods in free air. To ignite the lamp, the rods are touched together, thus allowing a relatively low voltage to strike the arc. The rods are then slowly drawn apart, and electric current heats and maintains an arc across the gap. The tips of the carbon rods are heated and the carbon vaporizes. The rods are slowly burnt away in use, and the distance between them needs to be regularly adjusted in order to maintain the arc.

Many complex mechanisms were invented to control the distance automatically, mostly based on solenoids. In one of the simplest mechanically regulated forms (which was soon superseded by more smoothly acting devices) the electrodes are mounted vertically. The current supplying the arc is passed in series through a solenoid attached to the top electrode. If the points of the electrodes are touching (as in start up) the resistance falls, the current increases and the increased pull from the solenoid draws the points apart. If the arc starts to fail the current drops and the points close again.

The Yablochkov candle is a simple arc lamp without a regulator, but it has the drawback that the arc cannot be restarted (single use) and a limited lifetime of only a few hours.

=== Spectrum ===
The spectrum emitted by a carbon-arc lamp is the closest to that of sunlight of any lamp. One of the first electric lights, their harsh, intense output usually limited their use to lighting large areas. Although invisible wavelengths were unknown at the time of their invention, unenclosed lamps were soon discovered to produce large amounts of infrared and harmful ultraviolet radiation not found in sunlight. If the arc was encased in a glass globe, it was found that many of these invisible rays could be blocked. However, carbon-arcs were soon displaced by safer, more efficient, versatile, and easier to maintain incandescent and gas-discharge lamps. Carbon-arc lamps are still used where a close approximation of sunlight is needed, for testing materials, paints, and coatings for wear, fading, or deterioration, or, for example, spacecraft materials that are to be exposed to sunlight at orbits closer than Earth's.

The arc consists of pure carbon-vapor heated to a plasma state. However, the arc contributes very little to the light output, and is considered non-luminous, as most of its emission occurs in spectral lines in the violet and UV portions of the spectrum. Most of the carbon spectra occurs in a very broad line centered at 389 nm (UV-A, just outside the visual spectrum), and a very narrow line at 250 nm (UV-B), plus some other less-powerful lines in the UV-C.

Most of the visible and IR radiation is produced from incandescence created at the positive electrode, or anode. Unlike the tungsten anodes found in other arc lamps, which remain relatively cool, carbon produces much higher resistance and the electrons are forced to enter the anode at the hottest point, generating tremendous amounts of heat that vaporizes the carbon and creates a pit in the anode's surface. This pit is heated from 6000 to 6500 degrees Fahrenheit (3300 to 3600 degrees Celsius, just below its melting point), causing it to glow very brightly with incandescence. Due to this, the electrodes were often placed at right angles from each other with the anode facing outward to keep from blocking its light output. Since carbon has the highest melting point of any element, it is the only lamp whose blackbody radiation is capable of nearly matching the Sun's temperature of 10,000 degrees Fahrenheit (5500 degrees Celsius), especially when filters are used to remove most of the IR and UV light.

== History ==
The concept of carbon-arc lighting was first demonstrated by Humphry Davy in the early 19th century, but sources disagree about the year he first demonstrated it; 1802, 1805, 1807 and 1809 are all mentioned. Davy used charcoal sticks and a two-thousand-cell battery to create an arc across a 4-inch (100 mm) gap. He mounted his electrodes horizontally and noted that, because of the strong convection flow of air, the arc formed the shape of an arch. He coined the term "arch lamp", which was contracted to "arc lamp" when the devices came into common usage.

In the late nineteenth century, electric arc lighting was in wide use for public lighting. The tendency of electric arcs to flicker and hiss was a major problem. In 1895, Hertha Ayrton wrote a series of articles for The Electrician, explaining that these phenomena were the result of oxygen coming into contact with the carbon rods used to create the arc. In 1899, she was the first woman ever to read her own paper before the Institution of Electrical Engineers (IEE). Her paper was "The Hissing of the Electric Arc".

The arc lamp provided one of the first commercial uses for electricity, a phenomenon previously confined to experiment, the telegraph, and entertainment.

=== Carbon-arc lighting in the U.S. ===

In the United States, there were attempts to produce arc lamps commercially after 1850, but the lack of a constant electricity supply thwarted efforts. Thus electrical engineers began focusing on the problem of improving Faraday's dynamo. The concept was improved upon by a number of people including William Edwards Staite and Charles F. Brush. It was not until the 1870s that lamps such as the Yablochkov candle were more commonly seen. In 1877, the Franklin Institute conducted a comparative test of dynamo systems. The one developed by Brush performed best, and Brush immediately applied his improved dynamo to arc-lighting, an early application being Public Square in Cleveland, Ohio, on April 29, 1879. Despite this, Wabash, Indiana claims to be the first city ever to be lit with "Brush Lights". Four of these lights became active there on March 31, 1880. Wabash was a small enough city to be lit entirely by 4 lights, whereas the installation at Cleveland's Public Square only lit a portion of that larger city. In 1880, Brush established the Brush Electric Company.

The harsh and brilliant light was found most suitable for public areas, such as Cleveland's Public Square, being around 200 times more powerful than contemporary filament lamps.

The usage of Brush electric arc lights spread quickly. Scientific American reported in 1881 that the system was being used in: 800 lights in rolling mills, steel works, shops, 1,240 lights in woolen, cotton, linen, silk, and other factories, 425 lights in large stores, hotels, churches, 250 lights in parks, docks, and summer resorts, 275 lights in railroad depots and shops, 130 lights in mines, smelting works, 380 lights in factories and establishments of various kinds, 1,500 lights in lighting stations, for city lighting, 1,200 lights in England and other foreign countries. A total of over 6,000 lights were actually sold.

There were three major advances in the 1880s: František Křižík invented in 1880 a mechanism to allow the automatic adjustment of the electrodes. The arcs were enclosed in a small tube to slow the carbon consumption (increasing the life span to around 100 hours). Flame arc lamps were introduced where the carbon rods had metal salts (usually magnesium, strontium, barium, or calcium fluorides) added to increase light output and produce different colours.

In the U.S., patent protection of arc-lighting systems and improved dynamos proved difficult and as a result the arc-lighting industry became highly competitive. Brush's principal competition was from the team of Elihu Thomson and Edwin J. Houston. These two had formed the American Electric Corporation in 1880, but it was soon bought up by Charles A. Coffin, moved to Lynn, Massachusetts, and renamed the Thomson-Houston Electric Company. Thomson remained, though, the principal inventive genius behind the company patenting improvements to the lighting system. Under the leadership of Thomson-Houston's patent attorney, Frederick P. Fish, the company protected its new patent rights. Coffin's management also led the company towards an aggressive policy of buy-outs and mergers with competitors. Both strategies reduced competition in the electrical lighting manufacturing industry. By 1890, the Thomson-Houston company was the dominant electrical manufacturing company in the U.S.

Around the turn of the century arc-lighting systems were in decline, but Thomson-Houston controlled key patents to urban lighting systems. This control slowed the expansion of incandescent lighting systems being developed by Thomas Edison's Edison General Electric Company. Conversely, Edison's control of direct current distribution and generating machinery patents blocked further expansion of Thomson-Houston. The roadblock to expansion was removed when the two companies merged in 1892 to form the General Electric Company.

Arc lamps were used in some early motion-picture studios to illuminate interior shots. One problem was that they produce such a high level of ultra-violet light that many actors needed to wear sunglasses when off camera to relieve sore eyes resulting from the ultra-violet light. The problem was solved by adding a sheet of ordinary window glass in front of the lamp, blocking the ultra-violet. By the dawn of the "talkies", arc lamps had been replaced in film studios with other types of lights. In 1915, Elmer Ambrose Sperry began manufacturing his invention of a high-intensity carbon arc searchlight. These were used aboard warships of all navies during the 20th century for signaling and illuminating enemies. In the 1920s, carbon arc lamps were sold as family health products, a substitute for natural sunlight.

Arc lamps were superseded by filament lamps in most roles, remaining in only certain niche applications such as cinema projection, spotlights, and searchlights. In the 1950s and 1960s the high-power D.C. for the carbon-arc lamp of an outdoor drive-in projector would typically be supplied by a motor–generator combo (AC motor powering a DC generator). Even in these applications conventional carbon-arc lamps were mostly pushed into obsolescence by xenon arc lamps, but were still being manufactured as spotlights at least as late as 1982 and are still manufactured for at least one purpose – simulating sunlight in "accelerated aging" machines intended to estimate how fast a material is likely to be degraded by environmental exposure.

Carbon arc lighting left its imprint on other film projection practices. The practice of shipping and projecting motion pictures on 2,000-foot reels, and employing "changeovers" between two projectors, was due to the carbon rods used in projector lamphouses having a lifespan of roughly 22 minutes (which corresponds to the amount of film in said reels when projected at 24 frames/second). The projectionist would watch the rod burn down by eye (though a peephole like a welder's glass) and replace the carbon rod when changing film reels. The two-projector changeover setup largely disappeared in the 1970s with the advent of xenon projector lamps, being replaced with single-projector platter systems, though films would continue to be shipped to cinemas on 2,000-foot reels.

== See also ==
- Graphite
- High-intensity discharge lamp
- Large-format slide projector
- Léon Foucault
- List of light sources
- List of Nikola Tesla patents
- Moonlight tower
- Pavel Yablochkov and Yablochkov candle
- Photolithography
- Praseodymium
- Shielded metal arc welding
- Stage lighting
- Timeline of lighting technology
- Walther Nernst

== Bibliography ==
- Braverman, Harry (1974). Labor and Monopoly Capital. New York: Monthly Review Press.
- MacLaren, Malcolm (1943). The Rise of the Electrical Industry during the Nineteenth Century. Princeton: Princeton University Press.
- Noble, David F. (1977). America by Design: Science, Technology, and the Rise of Corporate Capitalism. New York: Oxford University Press. pp. 6–10.
- Prasser, Harold C. (1953). The Electrical Manufacturers. Cambridge: Harvard University Press.
