= Sanford Alexander Moss =

American aviation engineer (1872–1946)

- Born: August 23, 1872; San Francisco, California, U.S.
- Died: November 10, 1946 (aged 74); Lynn, Massachusetts, U.S.
- Education: Cornell University University of California, San Francisco
- Known for: turbocharger
- Awards: National Aviation Hall of Fame (1976); Howard N. Potts Medal (1946); Collier Trophy (1940)
- Scientific career
- Fields: Engineering
- Workplaces: General Electric Company
- Thesis: The gas turbine an "internal combustion" prime-mover. (1903)

Sanford Alexander Moss (August 23, 1872 – November 10, 1946) was an American aviation engineer, who was the first to use a turbocharger on an aircraft engine.

== Life and career ==
Sanford Moss was born 1872 in San Francisco, California to Ernest Goodman Moss and Josephine Sanford. He received his B.S. and M.S. in engineering from the University of California, San Francisco.

On August 23, 1899, he married Jennie Edith Somerville Donnely in Chicago, Illinois.

Moss received his Ph.D. from Cornell University where he built his first gas turbine engine. In 1903 after graduation, Moss became an engineer for General Electric's Steam Turbine Department in Lynn, Massachusetts. At GE he worked with Elihu Thomson, Edwin W. Rice, and Charles Steinmetz. While there, he applied some of his concepts in the development of the turbosupercharger. His design used a small turbine wheel, driven by exhaust gases, to turn a supercharger.

In autumn of 1917 William F. Durand, Director of the National Advisory Committee for Aeronautics, received incomplete reports that a French engineer named Auguste Rateau was attempting to develop engines for high altitudes using a turbo-driven air compressor. Durand remembered Moss as a graduate student who worked on gas driven turbo engines twenty years earlier at Cornell before starting a career at the gas turbine division of General Electric. Durand wrote to the president of GE, Edwin W. Rice, requesting Moss' services:

"Dear Mr. Rice:

At the present time in connection with the development of the airplane and the Liberty engine for driving same, there is no problem which is perhaps more seriously before the Government officials than that of maintaining at high altitudes the power of the engine. In this connection we are especially desirous of developing the possibilities of a pre-compression of the air before going to the engine carburetor, thus maintaining, as nearly as may be, constant conditions regarding pressure at all altitudes.

In this connection we believe that your Dr. Sanford A. Moss could be of very great service in advising with us regarding the possibilities of pre-compression as applied to this problem, and I have written informally to Dr. Moss inviting his attention to the problem as outlined.

I desire, therefore, to ask your approval of the request, and that, if possible, you will authorize Dr. Moss to give such attention to this problem as may be necessary in order to give us the results of his experience in the study of such matters.

Thanking you in advance for your anticipated cooperation in this matter, I remain, -"

After this turbochargers became Moss' life work.

Moss built a high-RPM supercharger, driven by engine exhaust flow, and tested it in 1918 at Wright Field in Dayton, Ohio. As a result of this test, the government awarded its first supercharger contract to GE.

Later in 1918 Moss attached his turbo-supercharger to a Liberty V-12 aero engine and tested it near Pikes Peak. The test engine was able to maintain far higher air intake-charge densities at high altitude than an unassisted Liberty Engine.

Moss installed a 356 hp turbocharged engine on a LePere LUSAC biplane, which set international performance records, including in 1921 an altitude mark in excess of 40,000 feet; more than double LePere's operational ceiling.

After his retirement from GE in 1938, Moss was awarded the Collier Trophy, presented by the National Aeronautic Association in 1940 for his work on the turbocharger.

Moss was an aviation consultant to the Army and, in 1942, worked with Washington and GE as the company secretly created the 1-A, the first workable US jet aircraft engine, using the turbine principles that Moss had first researched.

He died on November 10, 1946, in Lynn, Massachusetts at 74 years of age.
