= Charles A. Coffin =

American businessman (1844–1926)

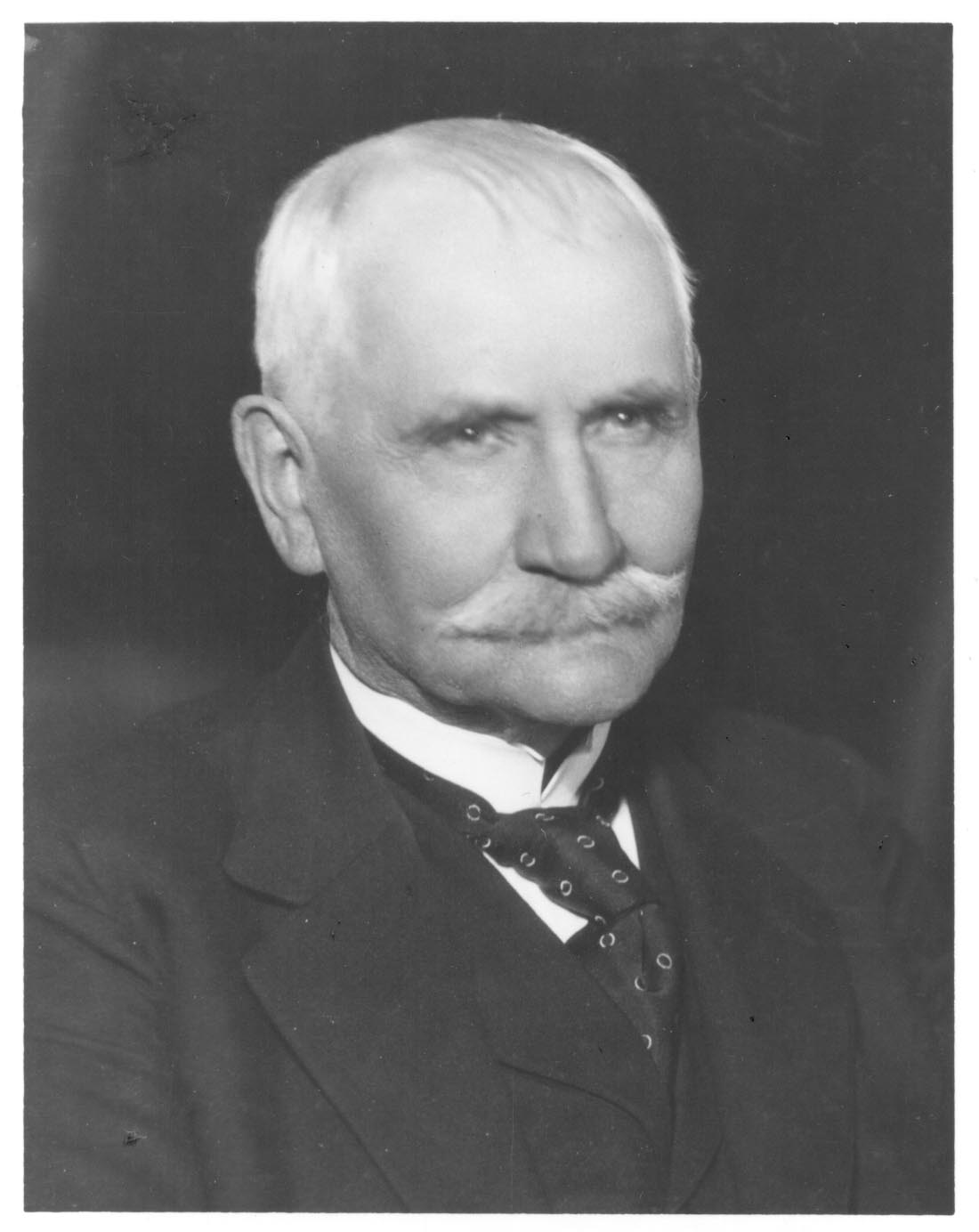
- Born: Charles Albert Coffin; December 31, 1844; Fairfield, Maine, US
- Died: July 14, 1926 (aged 81); Locust Valley, New York, US
- Resting place: Locust Valley Cemetery, Locust Valley, New York, U.S.
- Organization: General Electric

Charles Albert Coffin (December 31, 1844 – July 14, 1926) was an American businessman who was a co-founder and the first president of General Electric.

== Early life ==
Born in Fairfield, Maine, Coffin was the son of Albert Coffin (1817-1877) and his wife Anstrus Hobby (Varney) (1808-?). On September 23, 1872, he married Caroline Louise “Carrie” Russell (1845-1928) of Holbrook, Massachusetts, and had three children.

- Edward Russell (1873-1907)
- Jane May "Jennie Mae" (1875-1936)
- Alice Storrs (1879-1963)

== Career ==
At age 18, he moved to Lynn, Massachusetts, to join his uncle Charles E. Coffin and his shoe company, at which he spent the next twenty years. Eventually he established his own shoe factory named Coffin and Clough in Lynn.

In 1883, he was approached by another Lynn businessman, Silas A. Barton, to bring to town a struggling electric company from New Britain, Connecticut, finance it and lead it. With the engineering work of Elihu Thomson and Edwin J. Houston, Coffin was able to build up the company, renamed Thomson-Houston Electric Company, to be an equal to Thomas Edison's companies.

Under Coffin, Thomson-Houston deployed power plants in the South, including two in Atlanta, Georgia, to run the electric lighting and in 1889, Joel Hurt's electric streetcar line.

When General Electric was formed from Thomson-Houston and Edison's companies, Coffin was its first chief executive officer. The company was tested quickly during the Panic of 1893, in which Coffin negotiated with New York banks to advance money in exchange for GE-owned utility stocks.

He established a duopoly of important electric patents with Westinghouse Electric in the late 1890s, and in 1901 established a research laboratory for the company. Suggested by Charles Proteus Steinmetz, this was the first industrial research lab in the US. He supported GE engineers in the adaptation and development of the Curtis steam turbine, which advanced electric power generation. He retired from the board in 1922, and retained a large amount of GE stock. Upon his death in 1926, he was one of the wealthiest men in the world. Charles is buried in Locust Valley Cemetery, Locust Valley, New York.

Business positions
Preceded by (none)	President of General Electric; 1892–1912	Succeeded by Edwin Rice
Preceded by (none)	Chairman of General Electric; 1913–1922	Succeeded by Owen Young
