= Kelvin Gold Medal =

The Kelvin Gold Medal is a British engineering prize.

In the annual report for 1914, it was reported that the Lord Kelvin Memorial Executive Committee decided that the balance of funds left over from providing a memorial window at Westminster Abbey should be devoted to providing a Kelvin Gold Medal to mark "a distinction in engineering work or investigation" by the Presidents of eight leading British Engineering Institutions. There was a delay in awarding the first medal due to the World War.

The medal has been given triennially since 1920 for "distinguished service in the application of science to engineering". The Institution of Civil Engineers (Great Britain) administered the prize. The Committee of Presidents considers recommendations received from similar bodies from all parts of the world. The first recipient was William Unwin.

== Recipients ==
Year	Name	Ref	Country	Engineering Field
2013	Peter Davies		United Kingdom	discipline of Fluid Mechanics, particularly Environmental Fluid Mechanics
2010				
2007				
2004	Sir David Neil Payne		United Kingdom	Research into photonics, and its application to produce many of the key advances in optic fibre communications.
2001				
1998	Duncan Dowson		United Kingdom	Tri-Elasto-hydrodynamic lubrication; Bio-Tribology
1995	William Bonfield		United Kingdom	Materials science
1992	Prof Sir Bernard Crossland		United Kingdom	Mechanical Engineering
1989	John Boscawen Burland		South Africa	Soil mechanics
1986	Sir Alan Howard Cottrell		United Kingdom	Metallurgy
1983				
1980				
1977				
1974	Charles Stark Draper		United States	Control theory
1971	The Lord Penny		United Kingdom	Atomic Energy
1968	Sir Barnes Neville Wallis		United Kingdom	Marine Engineering
1965	Brigadier- General Sir Harold Hartley		United Kingdom	Physical and mineralogical chemistry
1962	Sir Edward Victor Appleton		United Kingdom	
1959	Sir Geoffrey Ingram Taylor		United Kingdom	Fluid dynamics
1956	Sir John Cockcroft		United Kingdom	Atomic Physics
1953	Chalmers Jack Mackenzie		Canada	Atomic Engineering
1950	Dr Theodore von Kármán		Hungary	Aerospace engineering
1947	Air Commodore Sir Frank Whittle		United Kingdom	
1944	Not awarded			
1941	not awarded			
1938	Sir Joseph John Thomson		United Kingdom	Sub Atomic Physics
1935	Sir John Ambrose Fleming		United Kingdom	Electrical Engineering
1932	1st Marquis of Marconi		Italy	Electrical and Radio Engineering
1929	André-Eugène Blondel		France	Physicist
1926	Sir Charles Algernon Parsons		United Kingdom	Steam Power Engineering
1923	Dr. Elihu Thomson		United States	Electrical Engineering
1920	William Cawthorne Unwin		United Kingdom	Civil Engineering

== See also ==
- List of engineering awards
