= Reginald H. Jones =

American business executive (1917–2003)

- Born: 11 July 1917; Stoke-on-Trent, England, United Kingdom
- Died: 30 December 2003 (aged 86); Greenwich, Connecticut, United States
- Education: Wharton School of the University of Pennsylvania
- Occupations: business, entire career with GE
- Years active: 1939–1981
- Known for: changing the relationship between business and government
- Notable work: General Electric Company CEO (1972–1981)

Reginald H. Jones (11 July 1917 – 30 December 2003) was the chairman and CEO of General Electric from 1972 to 1981.

== Biography ==
Jones was born in Stoke-on-Trent, England.

After graduating from the Wharton School of the University of Pennsylvania, where he was a brother of Phi Sigma Kappa, Jones joined the GE's business training course in 1939. He spent his entire career with GE. In 1968, Jones became the company's chief financial officer, and was elected senior vice-president two years later, in 1970. He was CEO from 1972 to 1981. He was awarded the Vermilye Medal in 1978.

Jones selected his successor, Jack Welch, based on the outcome of a succession contest. Jones' own account of that contest can be heard in an interview conducted with him by Prof. Gerald Zahavi (U-Albany, SUNY).

Jones is best known to the public for his role in changing the relationship between business and government. He was co-chairman of the Business Roundtable. He was chairman of The Business Council in 1979 and 1980.

On 30 December 2003, Jones died in Greenwich, Connecticut, United States. During his tenure as CEO of GE he implemented various innovative strategic planning initiatives, driving the corporation further into a global marketplace. Under his watch, the company's sales more than doubled; its profits did even better. In 1980, U.S. News & World Report ranked him as the most influential man in business.

Jones was a former chair of Wharton's Overseers and a Trustee of the University of Pennsylvania. He was awarded an honorary doctorate from Penn in 1980. He continues to be recognized at Wharton through the Reginald H. Jones Professorship of Corporate Management and the Reginald H. Jones and Grace Cole Jones Decade Donors.

Business positions
Preceded by Fred J. Borch	Chairman & CEO of General Electric; 1972 – 1981	Succeeded by Jack Welch
