= Thomson-Houston Electric Company =

Precursor of the US General Electric company

- Founded: 1882; 144 years ago
- Founders: Edwin Houston; Elihu Thomson
- Defunct: 1892; 134 years ago
- Successor: General Electric
- Headquarters: Lynn, Massachusetts, U.S.

The Thomson-Houston Electric Company was a manufacturing company that was one of the precursors of General Electric.

== History ==
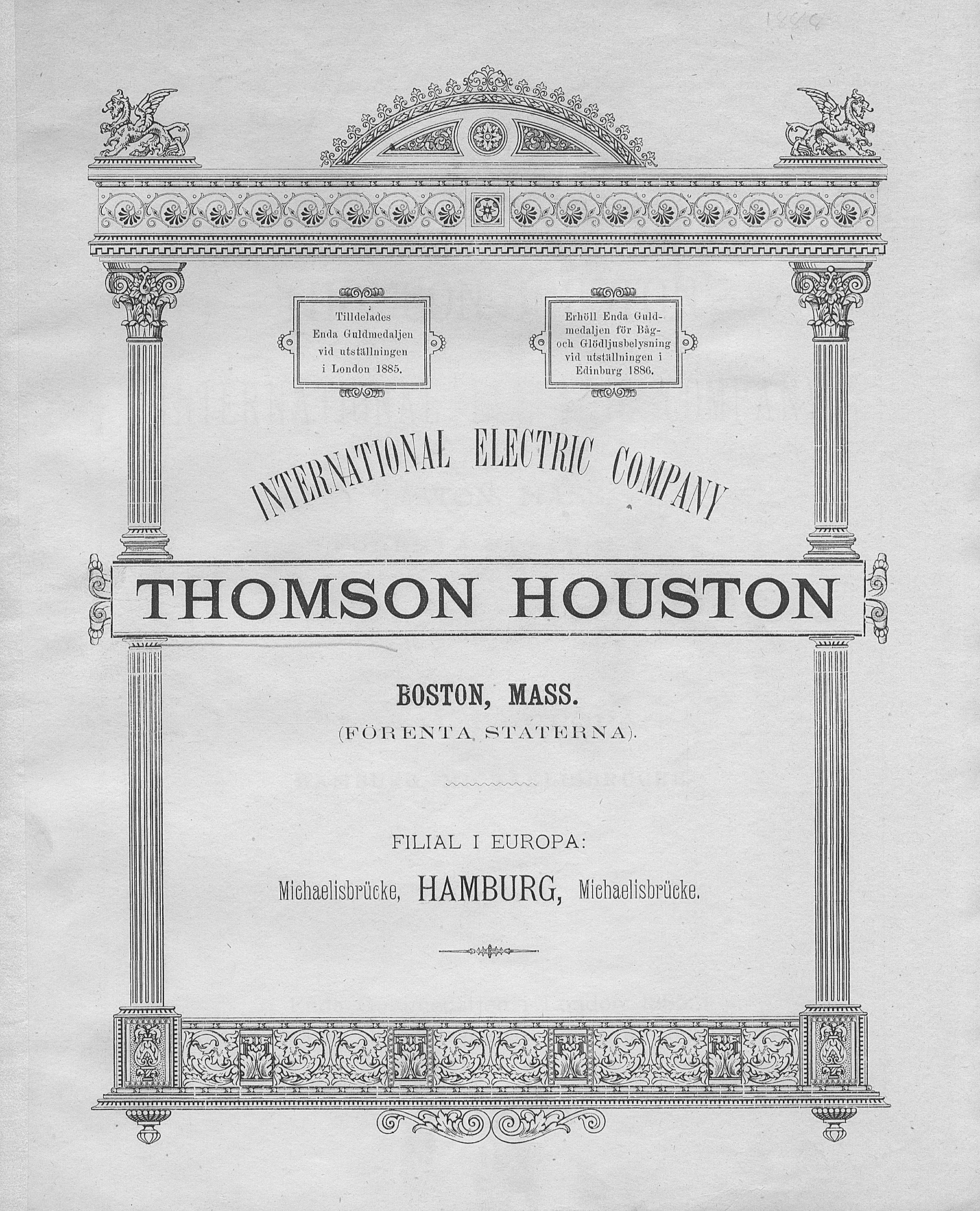
Brochure for the Thomson-Houston Electric Company

The company was founded as the American Electric Company by Elihu Thomson and Edwin Houston.

In 1882, Charles Albert Coffin led a group of investors—largely shoe manufacturers from Lynn, Massachusetts—who bought the company from investors in New Britain, Connecticut. They renamed it Thomson-Houston Electric Company and moved its operations to a new building on Lynn's Western Avenue.

Coffin led the company and organized its finances, marketing, and sales operations. Edwin Rice organized the manufacturing facilities, and Elihu Thomson ran the Model Room, a precursor to the industrial research lab.

In 1884, Thomson-Houston International Company was organized to promote international sales.

In 1885, the Lynn G.A.R. Hall was built with electric incandescent lighting by Thomson-Houston.

In 1888, Thomson-Houston supplied the Lynn & Boston Railroad with the generation and propulsion equipment for the Highland Circuit in Lynn, the first electric streetcar in Massachusetts.

In 1889, Thomson-Houston bought out the Brush Company (founded by Charles Brush) which resolved the arc lamp and dynamo patent disputes between them.

By 1892, the company had grown to some 4,000 employees and annual sales of $10,000,000 (equivalent to about $358,000,000 in 2025). A deal arranged by financier John Pierpoint Morgan merged the company with the Edison General Electric Company of Schenectady, New York, to form the General Electric Company.

The Lynn and Schenectady plants remain to this day as the two original GE factories.

== International companies ==
=== British Thomson-Houston ===
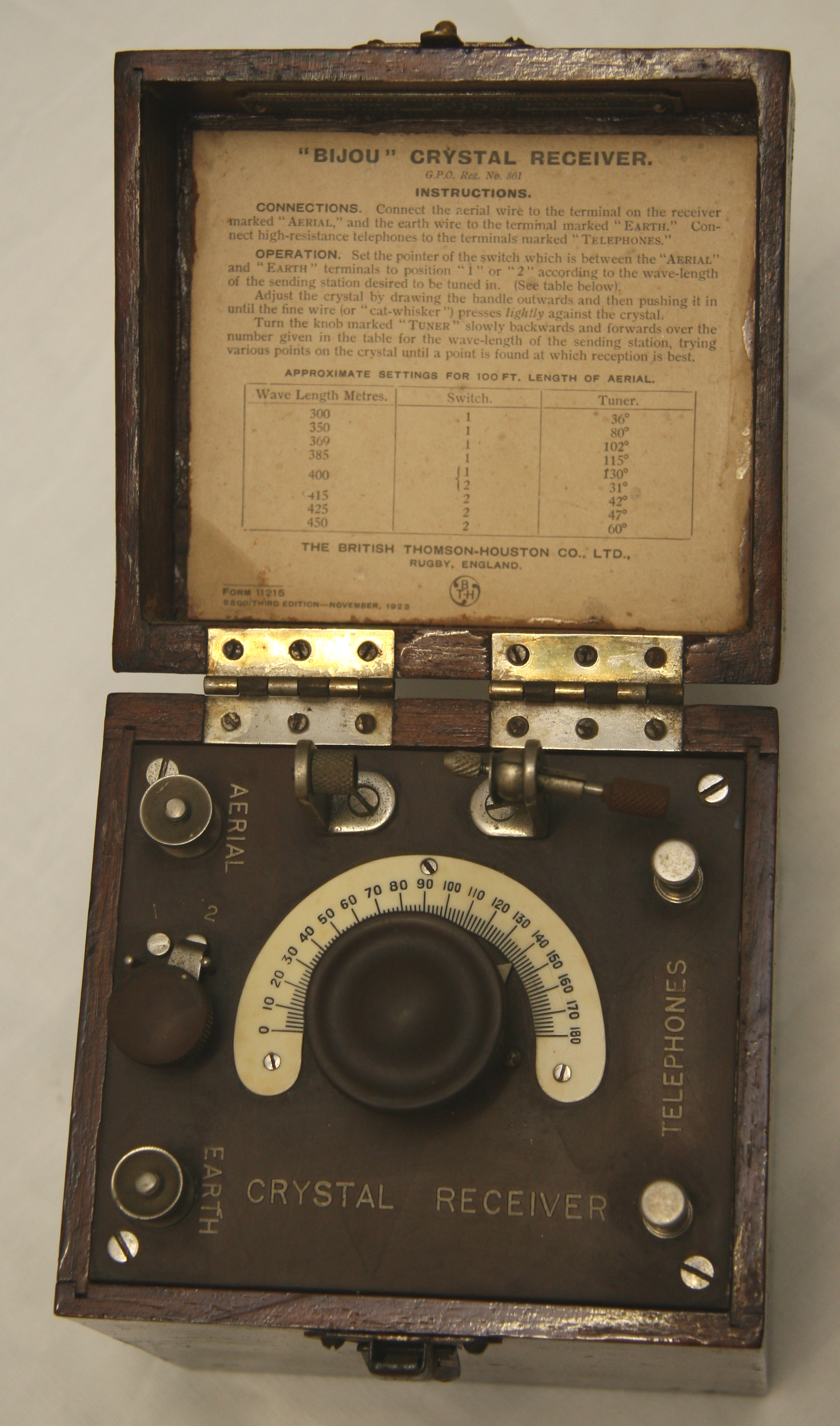
"Bijou" Crystal receiver manufactured in 1923 by the British Thomson-Houston Co.

British Thomson-Houston (BTH) was created as a subsidiary of (American) General Electric in May 1896. It was previously known as Laing, Wharton, and Down which was founded in 1886. BTH became part of Associated Electrical Industries (AEI) in 1928, which saw BTH merged with its rival Metropolitan-Vickers. This deal made AEI the largest military contractor of the British Empire during the 1930s and the 1940s, so during World War II. AEI would itself be acquired by the General Electric Company (GEC) in 1967. GEC demerged its defense businesses in 1999 to become Marconi plc and Marconi Corporation plc, now Telent.

=== Compagnie Française Thomson-Houston ===
In 1893, the Compagnie Française Thomson-Houston (CFTH) was formed in Paris, a sister company to GE in the United States. It is from this company that Alstom would evolve. A demerger in 1999 formed what is now Vantiva and Thomson-CSF.

== References and sources ==
Sources

- Hammond, John Winthrop. Men and Volts, the Story of General Electric published 1941. 436 pages.
- Carlson, W. Bernard. Innovation as a Social Process: Elihu Thomson and the Rise of General Electric, 1870-1900 (Cambridge: Cambridge University Press, 1991).
- Woodbury, David O. Elihu Thomson, Beloved Scientist (Museum of Science (Boston), 1944)
- Haney, John L. The Elihu Thomson Collection American Philosophical Society Yearbook 1944.
