= Aimee Morgans =

British engineer

Aimee Sian Morgans FREng
- Education: University of Cambridge
- Scientific career
- Workplaces: Imperial College London
- Thesis: Transonic helicopter noise. (2004)

Aimee Sian Morgans FREng is a British engineer who is Professor of Mechanical Engineering at Imperial College London. Her research considers thermoacoustic instabilities. She was elected Fellow of the Royal Academy of Engineering in 2021.

== Early life and education ==
Morgans studied engineering at the University of Cambridge, where she earned a master's of arts, a master's of engineering and a doctorate. Her doctoral research considered transonic helicopter noise.

== Research and career ==
In 2007, Morgans joined the faculty at Imperial College London. Morgans works on ways to make energy generation and transportation more environmentally friendly. In particular, she has concentrated on thermoacoustic instability and aerodynamic drag. In 2013, Morgans was awarded a European Research Council (ERC) Starting Grant to study the emissions of gas turbines. The combustion that occurs within gas turbines (for example those found in jet engines and power plants) produces emissions that can cause air pollution, but efforts to mitigate these emissions results in combustion instabilities. These instabilities occur due to unsteady burning of gases, which creates sound waves within the gas turbines that eventually damage the engines. These instabilities would limit the operational lifetimes of gas turbines, meaning that low emission turbines are not used in any meaningful capacity. Morgans looks to develop mathematical models of combustion instabilities. Her research was further supported by the European Research Council and Engineering and Physical Sciences Research Council in 2017, who awarded her a consolidator grant to translate computational predictions of thermoacoustic instabilities into industrial design. Later that year Morgans was the first woman to be made Professor in the Mechanical Engineering department at Imperial College London.

Morgans was elected a Fellow of the Royal Academy of Engineering in 2021.

== Selected publications ==
- Dowling, Ann P.; Morgans, Aimee S. (21 January 2005). "Feedback Control of Combustion Oscillations". Annual Review of Fluid Mechanics. 37 (1): 151–182. Bibcode:2005AnRFM..37..151D. doi:10.1146/annurev.fluid.36.050802.122038. ISSN 0066-4189.
- Zhao, Dan; Morgans, Aimee (21 May 2007). "Tuned Passive Control of Combustion Instabilities Using Multiple Helmholtz Resonators". 13th AIAA/CEAS Aeroacoustics Conference (28th AIAA Aeroacoustics Conference). Reston, Virginia: American Institute of Aeronautics and Astronautics. doi:10.2514/6.2007-3423. ISBN 978-1-62410-003-1.
- Han, Xingsi; Li, Jingxuan; Morgans, Aimee S. (2015). "Prediction of combustion instability limit cycle oscillations by combining flame describing function simulations with a thermoacoustic network model". Combustion and Flame. 162 (10): 3632–3647. doi:10.1016/j.combustflame.2015.06.020. hdl:10044/1/24521. ISSN 0010-2180. S2CID 98473482.

== Personal life ==
Morgans is married with two children.
