= Fred J. Borch =

Borch in 1971

Fred J. Borch (April 28, 1910 – March 1, 1995) was an American businessman who was chairman and CEO of General Electric from 1967 to 1972 and president and CEO from 1963 to 1967.

He served as chairman of The Business Council from 1969 to 1970.

Business positions
Preceded by Gerald L. Phillippe	President & CEO of General Electric; 1963–1967	Succeeded by (none)
Preceded by Gerald L. Phillippe	Chairman & CEO of General Electric; 1967–1972	Succeeded by Reginald H. Jones
