= William Dalby (engineer) =

British mechanical engineer

William Ernest Dalby, FRS (21 December 1862 – 25 June 1936) was a British engineer.

At the age of 14, he started work in the Stratford Locomotive Works of the Great Eastern Railway. In 1884, he moved to work in the Crewe Works of the London and North Western Railway as Chief Assistant in the Permanent Way Department. He studied in his spare time for a BSc degree at London University.

In 1891, he was appointed to help Sir Alfred Ewing set up an Engineering Department at Cambridge University. In 1904, upon the retirement of William Unwin, he was made Professor of Civil and Mechanical Engineering at the City and Guilds of London Institute Central Technical College, which, in 1907, was renamed the City and Guilds College and then, in 1910, became incorporated into Imperial College, London. There, he produced a number of Balancing Engines which were important in the development of more efficient railway engines. He wrote the book The Balancing of Engines published in 1902.

He was vice-president of both the Institute of Mechanical Engineers and the Institution of Civil Engineers. In 1913, he was elected a Fellow of the Royal Society.

He died at his home in Ealing, London.
