= William Unwin =

British engineer (1838–1933)

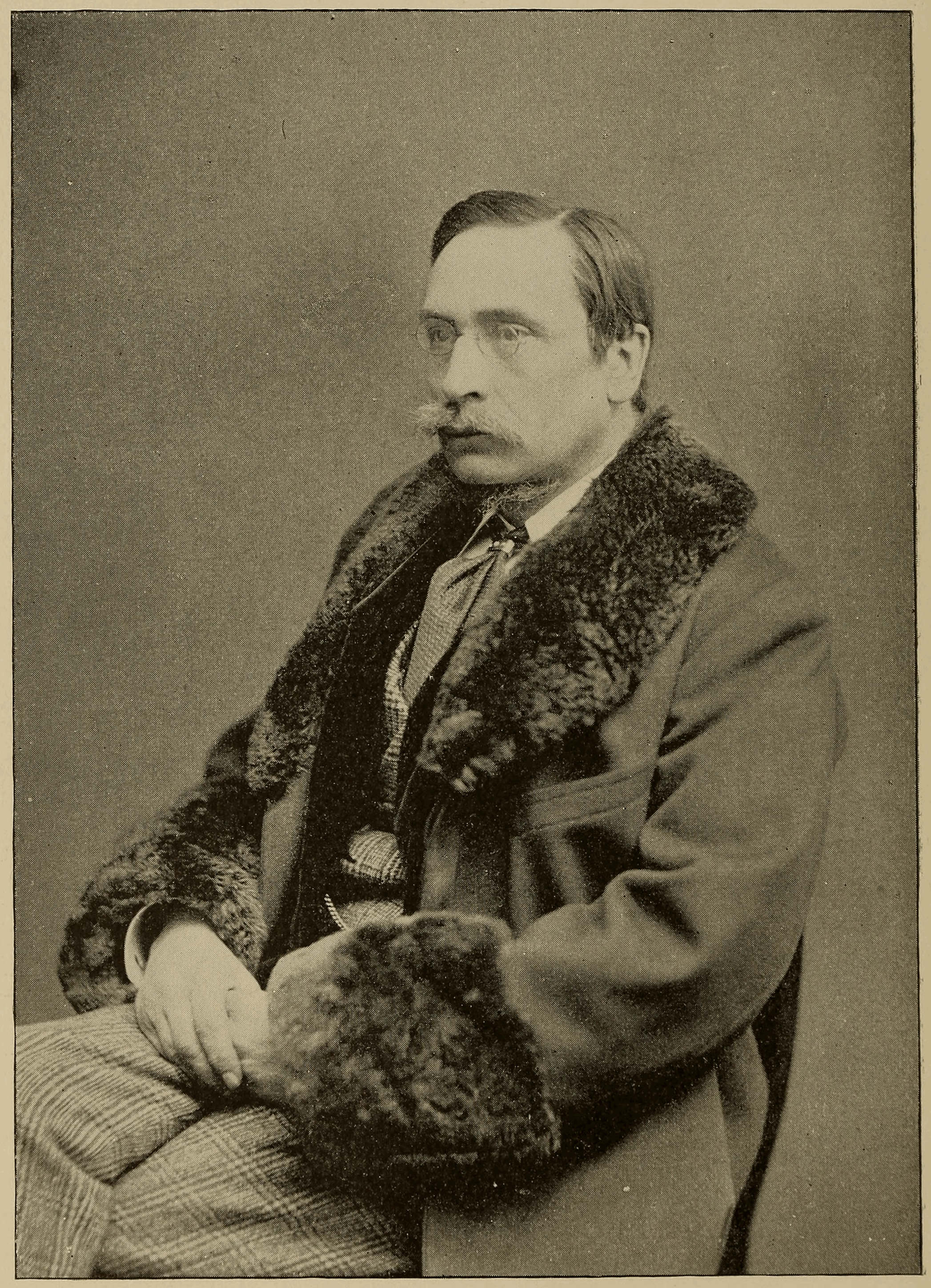
- Born: 12 December 1838; Coggeshall, Essex
- Died: 17 March 1933 (aged 94); Kensington
- Education: City of London School and New College London
- Parent(s): Eliza and William Jordon Unwin
- Engineering career
- Discipline: Civil
- Institutions: Institution of Civil Engineers (president), Institution of Mechanical Engineers (president)
- Awards: Kelvin Gold Medal

William Cawthorne Unwin FRS (12 December 1838 – 17 March 1933) was a British civil and mechanical engineer. He is noted for his extensive work on hydraulics and engines as well as his close association with William Fairbairn. He is one of only a few men who have served as president of both the Institution of Civil Engineers and the Institution of Mechanical Engineers. Unwin served as an engineering advisor to the government during the First World War and was the first recipient of the Kelvin Gold Medal awarded by the Institution of Civil Engineers.

== Biography ==
William was born to the Reverend William Jordon Unwin and his wife, Eliza, at Coggeshall, Essex. He received an education from the City of London School and studied for a year at New College, St John's Wood, many of the universities being closed to him due to his congregational roots. Having finished his studies he began work for William Fairbairn as a clerk in February 1856. Initially he worked in the Fairbairn Engineering Company testing department carrying out and documenting various structural and material tests.

In 1862 he was appointed to be works manager of the Williamson Brothers engineering works in Kendal where he manufactured water turbines for use in industrial mills. He returned to Fairbairn's as manager of the engine department in 1856, studying in his spare time to gain a Bachelor of Science degree by 1861. In 1868 he lectured at the school of Marine Engineering and Naval Architecture in London and began a series of five courses on civil engineering for Royal Engineers officers at Brompton Barracks in Kent. Having finished his lectures at Brompton he was appointed to the chair of hydraulic and mechanical engineering at the Royal Indian Engineering College (Coopers Hill) in Surrey in 1872. He remained there for twelve years, also serving as dean of the college.

He published Elements of Machine Design in 1877, one of his most famous articles. He also wrote the hydraulics entry for the Encyclopædia Britannica in 1881, an article that was much in demand by engineers of the time and resulted in that part of the Encyclopaedia being much sought after. In 1885 he was appointed professor of civil and mechanical engineering to the City and Guilds College, becoming the first professor of engineering at the University of London when the college was incorporated in 1900, he retired from academic life in 1904. Upon his retirement, W. Ernest Dalby replaced him in the vacated professorial chair.

Between 1890 and 1893 Unwin served as secretary of the commission to install hydroelectric power generators at Niagara Falls for the Niagara Falls Power Company, a scheme which would result in over 75 megawatts of electricity being generated for the town of Buffalo. He was retained by the company as a consulting engineer for the construction phase of the project. In this period he also acted as a consultant on various hydraulic schemes, including projects for the Government of Western Australia, the New Jersey Water Company, Derwent Valley Water Board, the Birmingham reservoirs and Lake Vyrnwy in Powys.

Much of Unwin's work in the 1890s was the testing of engines and boilers initially for coal-fired steam systems but later on internal combustion engines. He also investigated the tensile strength of various alloys using the 100 ton testing equipment at the college. Between 1896 and 1900 he was a member of the Departmental Committee of the Board of Trade investigating the loss of strength in steel rails performing many experiments on behalf of the committee.

In 1898, Unwin was elected an honorary member of the American Society of Mechanical Engineers, which noted his work on the commission that evaluated the potential for hydroelectric power at Niagara Falls.

He was elected as President of the Institution of Civil Engineers in November 1911 and served a one-year term. In 1913 he was made chairman of an Institution of Civil Engineers committee investigating the training of engineers, his professional development scheme remains an integral part of the training program. During the First World War Unwin volunteered his services to the government and served on the Gauge Committee of the Ministry of Munitions; the Metropolitan Munitions Committee and the Munitions Management Board. He served as Presidential Chair of the Institution of Mechanical Engineers between 1915 and 1916.

In 1921 he was the first recipient of the Kelvin Gold Medal. He was regarded by Sir Alexander Kennedy as one of the few professors with a full knowledge of the practical aspects of the profession. Late into his life he remained dedicated to the profession, attending a discussion on impact testing hosted by the Institution of Civil Engineers when he was 82. Unwin died, at his home in Kensington on 17 March 1933.

== Honours ==
- 1886 Fellow of the Royal Society
- 1886 Honorary Associate of the Royal Institute of British Architects
- 1890 Honorary Member of the American Philosophical Society
- 1890 Honorary Member of the Franklin Institute
- 1892 President of the Engineering Section of the British Association
- 1894 Member of the Council of the Royal Society
- 1896 James Watt Memorial Lecture (topic chosen by Unwin: the life of Gustave-Adolphe Hirn)
- 1898 Honorary Member of the American Society of Mechanical Engineers
- 1900 International Honorary Member of the American Academy of Arts and Sciences
- 1905 Honorary Doctor of Laws from the University of Edinburgh
- Honorary Member of the American Society of Civil Engineers

Professional and academic associations
Preceded by Alexander Siemens	President of the Institution of Civil Engineers; November 1911 – November 1912	Succeeded by Robert Elliott-Cooper
Preceded by Sir Frederick Donaldson	President of the Institution of Mechanical Engineers; 1915–1916	Succeeded by Michael Longridge
