= Edwin J. Houston =

American electrical engineer and author (1847–1914)

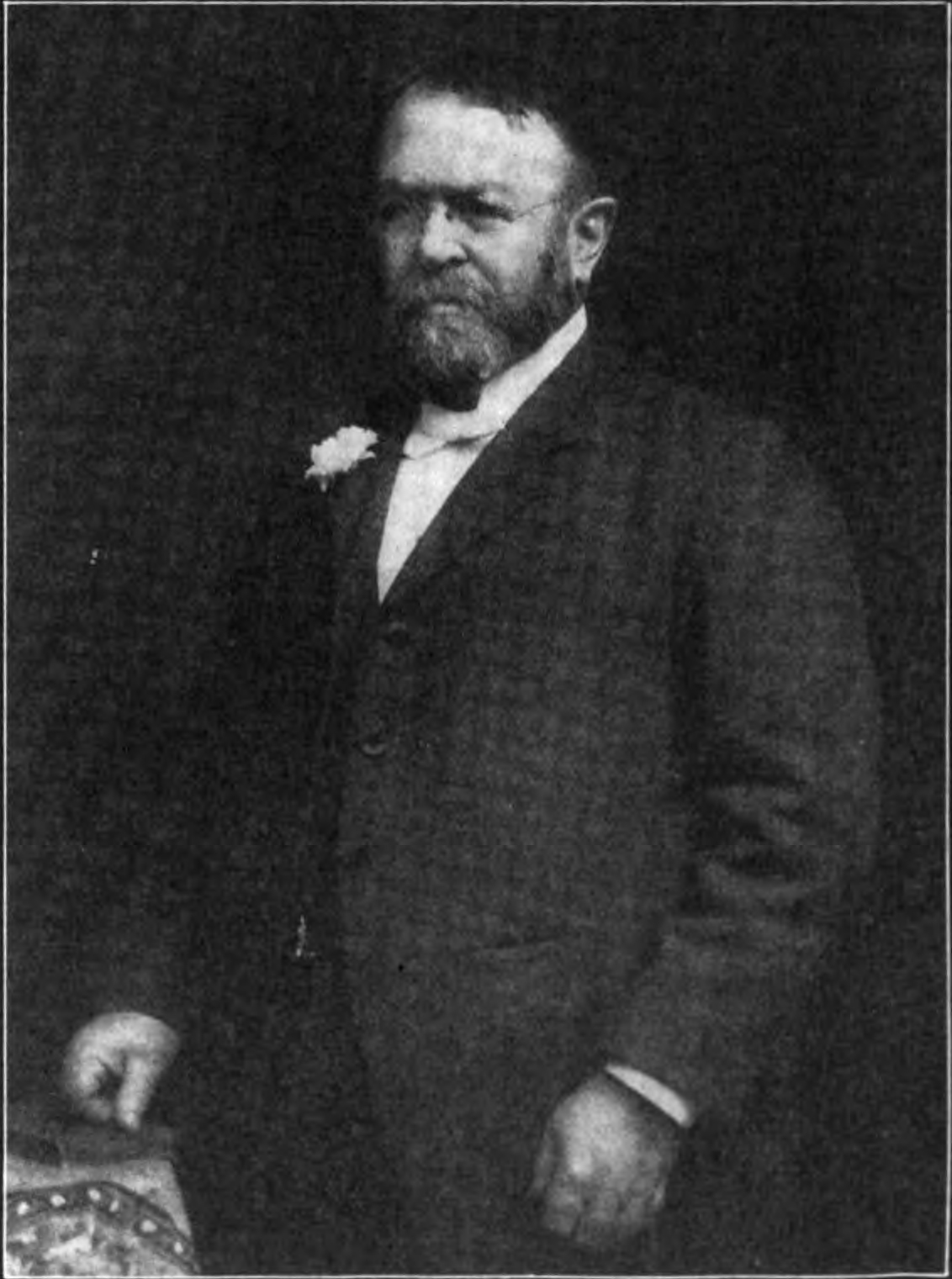
- Born: Edwin James Houston; July 9, 1847; Alexandria, Virginia, United States
- Died: March 1, 1914 (aged 66); Philadelphia, Pennsylvania
- Resting place: Laurel Hill Cemetery
- Occupations: electrical engineer; academic; businessman; inventor; writer

Edwin James Houston (July 9, 1847 – March 1, 1914) was an American author, electrical engineer, academic, businessman, and inventor.

== Early life ==
Houston was born July 9, 1847, to John Mason and Mary (Lamour) Houston in Alexandria, Virginia. He graduated from Central High School of Philadelphia (a degree-granting institution rather than an ordinary high school) in 1864. He received both his Bachelor of Arts and master's degree from the same Central High School.

== Career ==
Houston then became a professor of civil engineering at Central High School for a short period before holding its chair of Natural Philosophy and Physical Geography.

While teaching physics at Central High School in Philadelphia, he helped design an arc light generator with his former student colleague Elihu Thomson. Together, they created the Thomson-Houston Electric Company in 1882 which soon after moved to Lynn, Massachusetts. He served as chief electrician of Philadelphia's International Electrical Exhibition in 1884.

In 1892, Thomson-Houston merged with the Edison General Electric Company to form General Electric, with management from Thomson-Houston largely running the new company. In 1894, Houston formed a consulting firm in electrical engineering with Arthur Kennelly. He and Kennelly had also jointly published a series called "Primers of Electricity" in 1884.

He also served as emeritus professor of physics at the Franklin Institute and professor of physics at the Medico-Chirurgical College.

Houston was twice president of the American Institute of Electrical Engineers (1893–1895). He was a member of the United States Electrical Commission, the American Institute of Mining Engineers, the American Philosophical Society and many others. He also authored books for a series called The Wonder Books of Science.

== Awards and honors ==
Princeton University awarded him an honorary doctoral degree.

== Personal life ==
He died from heart failure in Philadelphia on March 1, 1914.

== Selected publications ==
=== Books ===
- Elements of Physical Geology. Philadelphia: Eldredge & Brother, 1878, 1901, and 1904.
- Intermediate Lessons in Natural Philosophy Philadelphia: Eldredge & Brother, 1881.
- Elements of Chemistry: for the use of Schools, Academies, and Colleges Philadelphia: Eldredge & Brother, 1883 and 1898.
- A Short Course in Chemistry. Philadelphia: Eldridge & Brother, 1884.
- Primers of Forestry. Philadelphia: Edwin J. Houston, 1891.
- Rain Produced At Will. Chicago: Edwin J. Houston, 1891.
- Electrical Measurements and Other Advanced Primers of Electricity. New York: The W. J. Johnston Company, Limited, 1893.
- The Electric Transmission of Intelligence: and Other Advanced Primers of Electricity New York: The W. J. Johnston Company, Limited, 1893.
- Outlines of Forestry; Or, The Elementary Principles Underlying the Science of Forestry. Philadelphia: J. B. Lippincott Company, 1893.
- Electricity One Hundred Years Ago and Today. New York: The W. J. Johnston Company, Ltd., 1894.
- A Dictionary of Electrical Words, Terms and Phrases. New York: P. F. Collier, 1894.
- Alternating Electric Currents with Arthur E. Kennelley. New York: The W. J. Johnston Company, 1895.
- Electrical Engineering Leaflets: Advanced Grade with Arthur E. Kennelley. New York: The Electrical Engineer, 1895.
- Electrical Engineering Leaflets: Intermediate Grade with Arthur E. Kennelley. New York: The Electrical Engineer, 1895.
- Electric Heating with Arthur E. Kennelley. New York: The W. J. Johnston Company, 1895.
- Elements of Physical Geography: For the Use of Schools, Academies, and Colleges. Philadelphia: Eldredge & Brother, 1895.
- Electric Arc Lighting with Arthur E. Kennelley. New York: The W. J. Johnston Company, 1896.
- Electricity in Electro-Therapeutics with Arthur E. Kennelley. New York: McGraw Publishing Co., 1896, 1897, 1898, 1903, and 1906.
- Electric Incandescent Lighting with Arthur E. Kennelley. New York: The W. J. Johnston Company, 1896.
- The Electric Motor and the Transmission Power with Arthur E. Kennelley. New York: The W. J. Johnston Company, 1896.
- Electric Street Railways with Arthur E. Kennelley. New York: The W. J. Johnston Company, 1896.
- Electro-dynamic Machinery for Continuous Currents with Arthur E. Kennelley. New York: The W. J. Johnston Company, 1896.
- Algebra Made Easy: Being a Clear Explanation of the Mathematical Formulae Found in Prof. Thompson's Dynamo-electric Machinery and Polyphase Electric Currents with Arthur E. Kennelley. New York: American Technical Book Company, 1897.
- Magnetism. with Arthur E. Kennelley. New York: McGraw Publishing Company, 1897 and 1906.
- The Elements of Natural Philosophy. Philadelphia, Eldridge & Brother, 1897.
- The Electric Telephone with Arthur E. Kennelley. New York: McGraw Publishing Company, 1897, 1902, and 1906.
- Electricity Made Easy: by Simple Language and Copious Illustration with Arthur E. Kennelley. New York: American Technical Book Company, 1898.
- Interpretation of Mathematical Formulæ with Arthur E. Kennelley. New York: McGraw Publishing Co., 1898.
- Recent Types of Dynamo-electric Machinery: A Complete Guide for the Electrician, Engineer, Student and Professor. with Arthur Edwin Kennelly. New York: P. F. Collier & Son, 1902.
- Incandescent Lighting with Arthur E. Kennelley. New York: The W. J. Johnston Company, 1896.
- Electric Telegraphy with Arthur E. Kennelley. New York: McGraw Publishing Co., 1897 and 1906.
- Pocket Electrical Dictionary. London: Swan Sonnenschein and Co., 1898.
- Electricity and Magnetism: Being a Series of Advanced Primers New York: McGraw Publishing Co., 1899.
- Electric Arc Lighting with Arthur E. Kennelley. New York: Electrical World & Engineer, 1902.
- Electricity in Everyday Life in 3 volumes. vol. 3. New York: P. F. Collier & Son, 1905.
- The Search for the North Pole. (North Pole Series) Chicago: The J. C. Winston Co., 1907.
- The Discovery of the North Pole. (North Pole Series) Chicago: The J. C. Winston Co., 1907.
- Cast Away at the North Pole. (North Pole Series) Chicago: The J. C. Winston Co., 1907.
- Wrecked on a Coral Island. Philadelphia:The Griffith & Rowland Press, 1908.
- Five Months on a Derelict; or, Adventures on a Floating Wreck in the Pacific. Philadelphia: The Griffith & Rowland Press, 1908.
- In Captivity in the Pacific. Philadelphia:The Griffith & Rowland Press, 1909.
- At School in the Cannibal Islands. Philadelphia: The Griffith & Rowland Press, 1909.
- The Elements of Physics with Alfred Newlin Seal. New York: Hinds, Noble & Eldredge, 1912.
- The Elements of Physical Geography. New York: Hinds, Noble & Eldredge, 1916.

=== Children's books ===
- Houston's Outlines of Natural Philosophy. Philadelphia: Claxton, Remsen & Haffelfinger, 1878.
- Houston's Easy Lessons in Natural Philosophy. Philadelphia: Eldredge and Brother, 1879.
- The Boy Geologist: at School and in Camp. Philadelphia: Henry Altemus Company, 1907.
- The Boy Electrician, or The Secret Society of the Jolly Philosophers. Philadelphia; London, J. B. Lippincott, 1907.
- The Wonder Book of Volcanoes and Earthquakes. New York: Frederick A. Stokes Company, 1907.
- The Wonder Book of the Atmosphere. New York: Frederick A. Stokes Company, 1907.
- The Wonder Book of the Light. New York: Frederick A. Stokes Company, 1908.
- The Wonder Book of the Magnetism. New York: Frederick A. Stokes Company, 1908.
- A Chip of the Old Block; or, At the Bottom of the Ladder (The Young Mineralogist Series). Philadelphia: The Griffith & Rowland Press, 1910.
- The Land of Drought; or, Across the Great American Desert. (The Young Mineralogist Series) Philadelphia: The Griffith & Rowland Press,1910.
- The Jaws of Death; or, In and Around the Cañons of the Colorado. (The Young Mineralogist Series) Philadelphia: The Griffith & Rowland Press, 1911.
- The Yellow Magnet; or, Attracted by Gold. (The Young Mineralogist Series) Philadelphia: The Griffith & Rowland Press, 1911
- Once a Volcano; or, Adventures Among the Extinct Volcanoes of the United States. (The Young Mineralogist Series) Philadelphia: The Griffith & Rowland Press, 1912
- The Land of Ice and Snow or, Adventures in Alaska. (The Young Mineralogist Series) Philadelphia: The Griffith & Rowland Press, 1912.
- Our Boy Scouts in Camp. Philadelphia: D. McKay, 1912.

=== Journal articles ===
- "Glimpses of the international electrical exhibition", Journal of the Franklin Institute, vol. 118, no. 6 (December 1884): 449–459.
- "On Some Early Forms of Electric Furnaces: No. 4. Johnson's Electric Furnace". Journal of the Franklin Institute, vol. 125, no. 4 (April 1888): 300-305.
- "The physiological effects of alternating currents of high frequency", Journal of the Franklin Institute, vol. 134, no. 1 (1892): 71–74
- "Some additional notes on the graphic representation or magnetic fields", Journal of the Franklin Institute, vol. 134, no. 3 (1892): 240–244.
- "Cerebral Radiation", Journal of the Franklin Institute, vol. 133, no. 6 (1892): 488–497.
- "Graphic representation or the magnetic field", Journal of the Franklin Institute, vol. 134, no. 1 (1892) 75–86
- "Some curiosities in early electroth-therapeutics", Journal of the Franklin Institute, vol. 134, no. 5 (1892): 402–409.
- "The international electrical congress and world's fair, of 1893". Transactions of the American Institute of Electrical Engineers, vol. 10, (1893): 464–483.
- "A Plea for the Study of Elementary Forestry in the Lower Schools". Journal of the Franklin Institute, vol. 137, no. 2 (1894): 107–117.
- "Resonance in Alternating Current Lines" with A. E. Kennelly. Transactions of the American Institute of Electrical Engineers, vol. 12, (1895): 133-157.
- "The Rontgen Rays" with A. E. Kennelly. Journal of the Franklin Institute, vol. 141, no. 4, (April 1896): 241-278.
- “Franklin as a Man of Science and an Inventor,” Journal of the Franklin Institute, vol. 161 (1906): 241–316, 321–383.

== See also ==
- Thomson-Houston Electric Company
