= Edwin W. Rice =

American electrical engineer (1862-1935)

Edwin Wilbur Rice Jr.
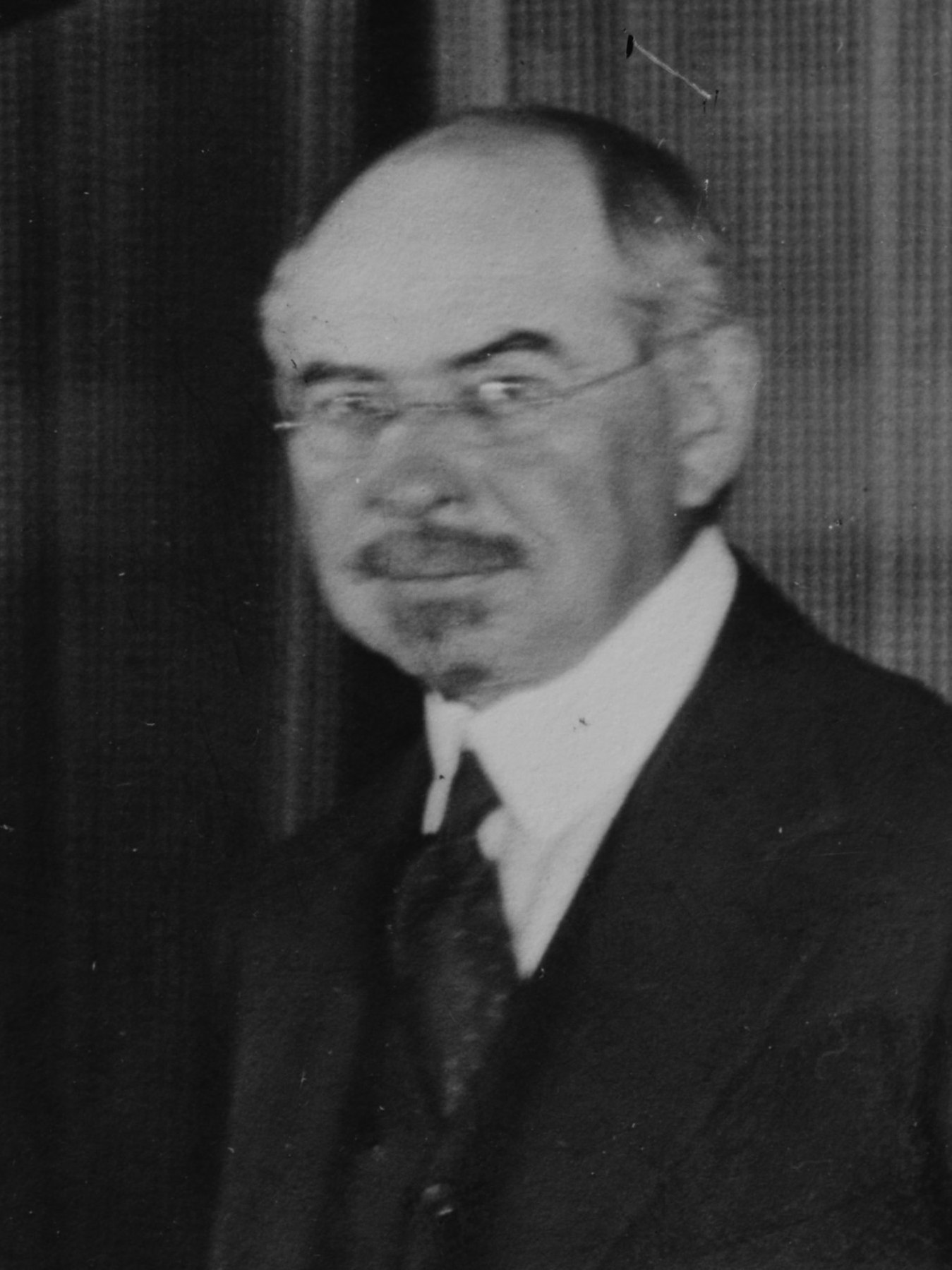
- Rice in 1922
- Born: 6 May 1862; La Crosse, Wisconsin, U.S.
- Died: 25 November 1935 (aged 73); Schenectady, New York, U.S.
- Education: Boys' Central High School, Philadelphia
- Awards: IEEE Edison Medal (1931)

Edwin Wilbur Rice Jr. (6 May 1862 – 25 November 1935) was a president and considered one of the three fathers of General Electric (along with Elihu Thomson and Charles A. Coffin).

== Early life ==
He attended the Boys' Central High School in Philadelphia and was a student of Elihu Thomson. Rice graduated in 1880 and considered going to Yale but decided to join Thomson in New Britain, Connecticut, at the American Electric Company as Thomson's assistant at $30 a month.

== Career ==
In 1883 he continued with Thomson, and moved from New Britain to Lynn, Massachusetts, to work for the newly formed Thomson-Houston Electric Company. There he worked on converting Thomson's inventions into manufactured products. In 1885 he became the factory superintendent when John Meech moved to Europe to head up Thomson-Houston International. Under Rice the Lynn factory grew from almost nothing in 1883 to an enterprise with $10 million in sales and 4,000 employees in 1892. Primary products included arc light systems, electrical generators, dynamos, meters, transformers, and electric motors. By 1892 the primary products were electric trolley car systems: the company had built over 2700 electric trolley cars and 870 electric generator stations. The entire factory reported to Rice and in 1890 supervisors who reported to him included D. M. Barton - Production Manager, I. F. Baker - Mechanical Superintendent, G. E. Emmons - Factory Auditor, W. H. Knight - Chef Electrical Engineer, and A. I. Rohrer - Chef Assistant.

In 1892 General Electric Company was created after a merger with Edison General Electric. Rice was originally its technical director. He became, in 1896, vice president in charge of manufacturing and engineering, and eventually senior vice president. In 1913 he was chosen president of the company replacing Charles A. Coffin who moved on to be the chairman of the board of GE. When Rice retired in 1922 was made honorary chairman of the board.

Rice was elected president in 1917 of the American Institute of Electrical Engineers (AIEE). He was elected to the American Philosophical Society in 1928.

In 1931 the AIEE awarded him the Edison Medal "For his contributions to the development of electrical systems and his encouragement of scientific research in industry."

Business positions
Preceded by Charles A. Coffin	President of General Electric; 1913 – 1922	Succeeded by Gerard Swope
