= Elihu Thomson =

English-American engineer and inventor (1853–1937)

- Thomson, c. 1883 – c. 1890
- Born: March 29, 1853; Manchester, England
- Died: March 13, 1937 (aged 83); Swampscott, Massachusetts, U.S.
- Resting place: Pine Grove Cemetery, Lynn, Massachusetts
- Known for: Thomson-Houston Electric Company; arc lighting; resistance welding; recording wattmeter; repulsion motor
- Spouses: Mary Louise Peck (m. 1884; died 1916) Clarissa Hovey (m. 1923)
- Children: 4
- Awards: Rumford Prize (1901); AIEE Edison Medal (1909); Elliott Cresson Medal (1912); Hughes Medal (1916); John Fritz Medal (1916); Kelvin Gold Medal (1924); Franklin Medal (1925); Faraday Medal (1927); Grashof Medal (1935)

Signature
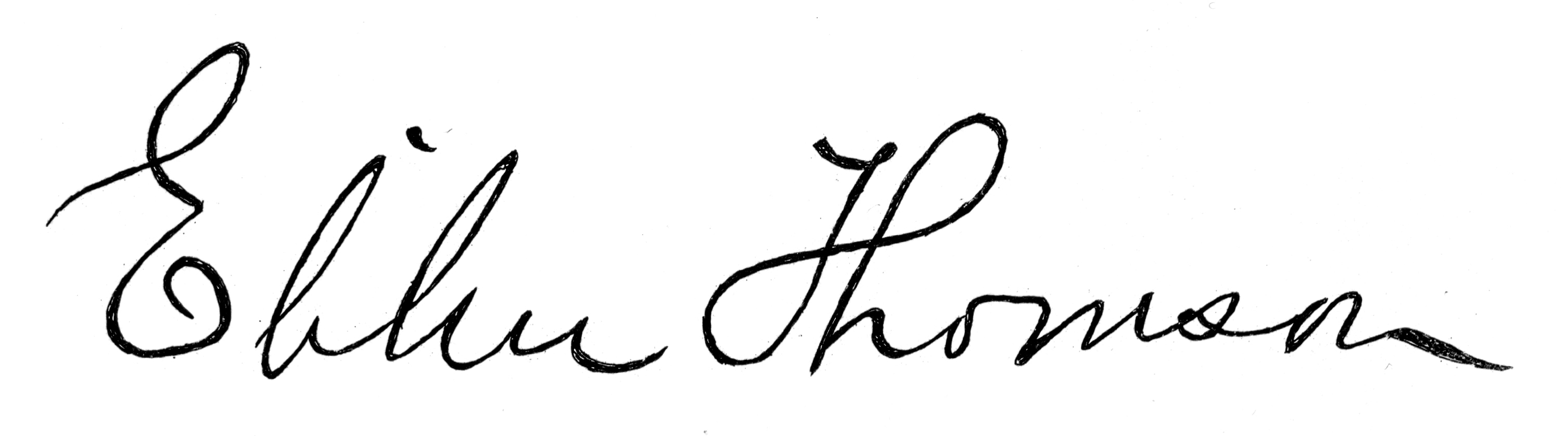

Elihu Thomson (March 29, 1853 – March 13, 1937) was an English-American engineer and inventor who was instrumental in the founding of major electrical companies in the United States, the United Kingdom and France.

== Early life ==
He was born in Manchester, England, on March 29, 1853, but his family moved to Philadelphia in the United States in 1858. Thomson attended Central High School in Philadelphia and graduated in 1870. Thomson took a teaching position at Central, and in 1876, at the age of twenty-three, held the chair of Chemistry. In 1880, he left Central to pursue research in the emerging field of electrical engineering.

== Electrical innovations ==
With Edwin J. Houston, a former teacher and later colleague of Thomson's at Central High School, Thomson founded the Thomson-Houston Electric Company. Notable inventions created by Thomson during this period include an arc-lighting system, an automatically regulated three-coil dynamo, a magnetic lightning arrester, and a local power transformer. In 1892 the Thomson-Houston Electric Company merged with the Edison General Electric Company to become the General Electric Company.

The historian Thomas P. Hughes writes that Thomson "displayed methodological characteristics in the workshop and the laboratory as [an] inventor and in the business world as [an] entrepreneur. He also chose to solve problems in the rapidly expanding field of electric light and power." Thomson's name is further commemorated by the British Thomson-Houston Company (BTH), and the French companies Thomson SA (now Vantiva) and Alstom (formerly Alsthom).

Thomson was notable both for his emphasis on models and for the singular focus with which he pursued his research, with Thomson referring to his workshop as a "model room" rather than a laboratory. Between 1880 and 1885, Thomson averaged twenty-one patent applications annually, doubling that average between 1885 and 1890.

Upon the merger of Thomson-Houston Electric Company (his namesake company) to form General Electric in 1892, Thomson chose to keep his laboratory at Lynn, Massachusetts near Boston away from GE's New York headquarters to ensure his control over his research. At the Lynn GE plant, he worked with Edwin Rice (later President of GE in 1913) and Sanford Moss and Charles Steinmetz (who was located at GE headquarters in Schenectady, New York). After being asked to become a director of GE, Thomson rejected the offer preferring continued research to management.

Thomson began lecturing on electrical engineering at MIT in 1894, was elected a life member of its board in 1898. He declined to be president in 1897, saying that he was "not an executive by nature". Vannevar Bush later credited him with helping to bring Richard Maclaurin to MIT as president in 1909.

After Maclaurin's death in early 1920, a committee of three faculty members took over the daily operations of the institute. MIT's lawyers held that diplomas required the signature of an acting president, so Thomson took the post in March 1920, on the understanding that his role would be largely ceremonial. The board elected physicist Ernest Fox Nichols in March 1921, but Nichols fell ill immediately after his inauguration that June and resigned in November. Thomson returned as acting president and filled the role until Samuel W. Stratton took office in 1923.

== Personal life ==
He married Mary Louise Peck (born: June 1, 1856 in New Britain, Hartford County, Connecticut) on May 1, 1884, and was father to four children: Stuart Thomson (b:. August 13, 1886), Roland Davis Thomson (b:. June 17, 1888), Malcolm Thomson (b.: August 30, 1891), Donald Thurston Thomson (b.: April 10, 1893)

His second wife was Clarissa Hovey Thomson.

He was a founding member, as well as the second president, of the International Electrotechnical Commission.

On June 21, 1932, at age 79, Thomson was interviewed on film talking about his life and times.

Thomson died at his estate in Swampscott, Massachusetts. The Elihu Thomson House in Swampscott was designated a U.S. National Historic Landmark in 1976 and serves as Swampscott's town hall.

== Patents ==
Thomson held more than 700 patents. Thomson used his patents to bolster his company, Thomson-Houston Company, later General Electric.

- U.S. patent 261,790 Electric-Arc Lamp
- U.S. patent 283,437 Electric Lamp
- U.S. patent 297,200 Electric-Arc Lamp
- U.S. patent 302,963 Regulator For Dynamo-Electric Machines
- U.S. patent 335,159 System Of Electric Distribution
- U.S. patent 350,956 Automatic Compensator For Magnets
- U.S. patent 367,469 System Of Electric Distribution
- U.S. patent 360,122 System Of Electric Distribution
- U.S. patent 403,707 Process Of Electric Soldering
- U.S. patent 451,345 Method Of Electric Welding
- U.S. patent 461,144 Electric-Arc Lamp
- U.S. patent 461,856 Mode Of Making Tools
- U.S. patent 478,145 Electric-Arc Lamp
- U.S. patent 488,585 Electric-Arc Lamp
- U.S. patent 500,629 Electric Switch
- U.S. patent 508,647 Electric-Lighting System
- U.S. patent 501,114 Lightning-Arrester
- U.S. patent 502,788 Regulator For Electric Generators
- U.S. patent 518,291 Mode Of Cooling Electric Motors
- U.S. patent 735,621 Electrostatic Motor
- U.S. patent 1,078,225 Electrical Welding Of Sheet Metal

== Awards and honors ==
- 1901: Rumford Prize of the American Academy of Arts and Sciences
- 1909: AIEE Edison Medal of the American Institute of Electrical Engineers
- 1912: Elliott Cresson Medal of the Franklin Institute
- 1916: Hughes Medal of the Royal Society
- 1916: John Fritz Medal of the American Association of Engineering Societies
- 1923: Kelvin Gold Medal of the Institute of Civil Engineers
- 1925: Franklin Medal of the Franklin Institute
- 1927: Faraday Medal of the Institution of Engineering and Technology
- 1930: Honorary member ASME (1930)

Thomson was the first recipient of the American Institute of Electrical Engineers (now Institute of Electrical and Electronics Engineers) Edison Medal, bestowed upon him in 1909 "For meritorious achievement in electrical science, engineering and arts as exemplified in his contributions thereto during the past thirty years."; Thomson was also president of the organization from 1889–90. Near the end of his life, Thomson's second wife Clarissa Hovey Thomson is reported to have said that she had to carry a basket with her to carry all of Thomson's awards and honors.

He was elected as a member of the American Philosophical Society in 1876.

In 1889, he was decorated by the French Government for his electrical inventions, being made Chevalier et Officier de la Légion d'honneur. He received the honorary degree of A.M. from Yale (1890). Tufts College in 1892 gave him the degree of Ph.D., and in 1899 he received a D.Sc. from Harvard.

== See also ==
- Electricity meter
- Electromagnetic propulsion
- Electronic oscillator
- Negative resistance
- Repulsion motor
- Shaded-pole motor
- Tesla coil
- Three-phase electric power
- Welding
