= List of Boston University School of Law alumni =

A list of Boston University School of Law notable alumni follows below in alphabetical order.

== Notable alumni ==
- Nathan Abbott, LLB 1881, founding Dean of Stanford Law School
- Sharif Abdullah, founder and president of Commonway Institute and the Common Society Movement
- Charles J. Adams LLB 1951, Vermont Attorney General
- Lincoln C. Almond, JD 1961, Governor of Rhode Island
- George W. Anderson, LLB 1890, Judge of the U.S. Court of Appeals for the First Circuit.
- Gleason Archer, Sr., LLB 1906, founder of Suffolk University Law School
- Chip Babcock, JD 1976, attorney
- Consuelo Northrup Bailey, LLB 1925, Lieutenant Governor of Vermont, first woman elected as lieutenant governor in the United States
- F. Lee Bailey, LLB 1960, 1966, disbarred criminal defense lawyer; represented O. J. Simpson, among others
- Jennie Loitman Barron, LLB 1913, LLM 1914, first woman appointed associate justice of the Massachusetts Superior Court
- Carolyn Berger, JD 1976, first woman Justice of the Delaware Supreme Court
- Albert Brown, JD, Governor of New Hampshire
- Fred H. Brown, JD, Governor of New Hampshire, U.S. Congressman
- Edward W. Brooke, LLB 1948, LLM 1949, Attorney General of Massachusetts; first African American elected to the Senate by popular vote; one of only five African Americans to serve in the US Senate; awarded the Presidential Medal of Freedom.
- William M. Butler, 1884, U.S. Senator (MA)
- Don Calloway, JD 2005, Missouri State Representative (2009–Present)
- George Frederick Cameron, 1854–1885, Canadian poet and journalist, best known for writing the libretto for first Canadian operetta Leo, the Royal Cadet
- Arthur P. Carpenter, LLB 1897, US Marshal for Vermont
- Norman S. Case, LLB 1912, Governor of Rhode Island and the Providence Plantations
- Walter H. Cleary, LLB 1915, Chief Justice of the Vermont Supreme Court
- Martha M. Coakley, JD 1979, Massachusetts Attorney General, District Attorney for Middlesex County, Massachusetts
- William S. Cohen, LLB 1965, U.S. Secretary of Defense and US Senator from Maine
- Warren A. Cole - founder of Lambda Chi Alpha, one of the largest social fraternities in the United States
- John F. Collins, 1908, Mayor of Providence, Rhode Island
- Deane C. Davis, LLB 1922, Governor of Vermont, 1969-1973
- Elaine Denniston, supported the Apollo program
- Paul A. Dever, JD, Governor of Massachusetts
- Joshua Eric Dodge, 1877, Wisconsin Supreme Court
- Don Feder, 1972, Jewish American LGBT rights activist and war protester during Vietnam
- Samuel Felker, JD, Governor of New Hampshire
- Anna Christy Fall (1855–1930), lawyer
- Ivan Fisher, LLB, A prominent Manhattan lawyer
- Michael F. Flaherty, JD 1994, President of the Boston City Council
- James C. Foster JD 1976, is the chairman and chief executive officer of Charles River Laboratories, Inc.
- Frank H. Freedman, LLB 1949, LLM 1950, Senior Judge of the U.S. District Court for the District of Massachusetts
- Kyle Evans Gay, member of the Delaware Senate
- Richard Graber, JD 1981, former United States Ambassador to the Czech Republic
- Judd A. Gregg, JD 1972, LLM 1975, U.S. Senator, Governor of New Hampshire
- Mary Ann Greene, JD 1888
- Emanuel Molyneaux Hewlett, LLB 1877, first African-American graduate of Boston University School of Law; early African-American Justice of the Peace in Washington, D.C.; first African-American (as co-counsel to Wilford H. Smith) to win a case before the United States Supreme Court.
- Jeff Jacoby, JD 1983, Boston Globe opinion/editorial columnist
- Olin M. Jeffords, LLB 1918, LLD 1939, Chief Justice of the Vermont Supreme Court, father of Senator Jim Jeffords
- Stephen Douglas Johnson, LLM 1989, U.S. House Chief Counsel for Financial Institutions and Consumer Credit, 1995–98; White House Senior Advisor for the Office of Federal Housing Enterprise Oversight (OFHEO), 2000–03
- Clarence Benjamin Jones, LLB 1959, personal counsel, advisor, draft speech writer and close friend of Martin Luther King Jr.
- Dr. Barbara C. Jordan, LL.B. 1959, first African-American woman elected to the U.S. Congress from a southern state, awarded the Presidential Medal of Freedom in 1994, first woman to deliver a keynote address at the Democratic National Convention in 1976
- David E. Kelley, JD 1983, Emmy winning television producer
- Takeo Kikuchi, LLB 1877, one of the first Japanese to study law in the US, founder and first president of Tokyo's Chuo University
- Rikki Klieman, JD, 1975, criminal defense lawyer and TV personality for truTV
- Jeremy Kudon, JD 2000, chairman of the Sports Betting Alliance and executive director of the American Innovators Network
- Gary F. Locke, JD 1975, United States Secretary of Commerce, Governor of Washington, and the first Asian-American governor in the mainland U.S.
- Maria Lopez, first Hispanic appointed a judge in the Massachusetts, current television jurist on the U.S. syndicated television show Judge Maria Lopez.
- Sandra L. Lynch, JD 1971, first woman judge appointed to the U.S. Court of Appeals for the First Circuit
- Frederick William Mansfield, LLB 1902, 46th Mayor of Boston, Massachusetts, and 38th Treasurer and Receiver-General of Massachusetts.
- Elizabeth (Sadie) Holloway Marston, LLB 1918 - co-creator of the comic book character Wonder Woman
- William C. Matthews, LLB 1907, played football and baseball for Harvard University; seen by many as the Jackie Robinson of his day
- J. Howard McGrath, LLB 1929, Sixtieth Attorney General, 1949-52 U.S. Senator, 1940–45Governor of Rhode Island.
- Thomas McIntyre, JD, U.S. Senator (NH)
- Jordan Mintz, JD, Enron whistleblower
- F. Bradford Morse, LLB 1949, director of the United Nations Development Program
- Markos Moulitsas, JD 1999, founder of the blog Daily Kos
- Demetrius Newton, JD 1952, civil rights attorney
- Shannon O'Brien, JD 1985, first woman to hold the office of treasurer and receiver general of the Commonwealth of Massachusetts
- Joseph F. Quinn, LLB 1886, first Irishman appointed to the bench in Massachusetts, presided over the 1912 trial of Joseph Ettor and two other leaders of the Lawrence textile strike.
- Matt Rinaldi, JD 2001, attorney in Irving, Texas; Republican member of the Texas House of Representatives
- Dennis J. Roberts, 1930, Mayor of Providence and governor of Rhode Island
- William Russell, JD, Governor of Massachusetts
- Sabita Singh, JD 1990, first judge of south Indian descent in the Commonwealth of Massachusetts.
- Wilford H. Smith, LLB 1883, first African-American attorney (with co-counsel Emanuel Molyneaux Hewlett) to win a case before the United States Supreme Court.
- Robert T. Stafford, LLB 1938; HON 1959, U.S. Senator, father or the Stafford Loan program, the Stafford Disaster Relief and Emergency Assistance Act and co-sponsored the Wilderness Protection Act
- Mike Sullivan (pitcher), LLB 1896, professional baseball player and Massachusetts state legislator
- E. Leroy Sweetser, LLB 1897, U.S. Army brigadier general
- Charles Tetzlaff, LLB 1964, United States Attorney for the District of Vermont.
- Frank D. Thompson, LLB 1899; Associate Justice of the Vermont Supreme Court
- Ojetta Rogeriee Thompson, JD, Rhode Island Superior Court justice and judge on the United States Court of Appeals for the First Circuit
- Juan R. Torruella, JD 1957, first Hispanic to serve on the United States Court of Appeals for the First Circuit
- Robert Upton, JD, U.S. Senator (NH)
- David I. Walsh, JD, U.S. Senator, Governor of Massachusetts
- Clifton Reginald Wharton Sr., LLB 1920, first African-American Foreign Service Officer in the U.S. Department of State; the first black diplomat to become ambassador by rising through the ranks of the Foreign Service rather than by political appointment; and the first black diplomat to lead a U.S. delegation to a European country.
- Avon Williams, LLB 1947; LLM 1948, prominent civil rights attorney and Tennessee state senator
- Butler Roland Wilson, LLB 1883, co-founder of the Boston branch of the NAACP; branch president from 1926 to 1936; national board of directors in the 1920s.
- Steven M. Wise, JD 1976, founder of the Nonhuman Rights Project and former president of the Animal Legal Defense Fund
- Myrth York, JD 1972, Rhode Island State Senator, first female chair of the Senate Health, Education and Welfare Committee (RI)
- Owen D. Young, LLB 1896, founder of RCA, 1929 Time Magazine's Man of the Year Chairman and CEO of General Electric
- David Zaslav, CEO Discovery
