= List of St. Lawrence University people =

The following is a list of notable people associated with St. Lawrence University, located in the American city of Canton, New York.

== Notable alumni ==
=== Politics and government ===
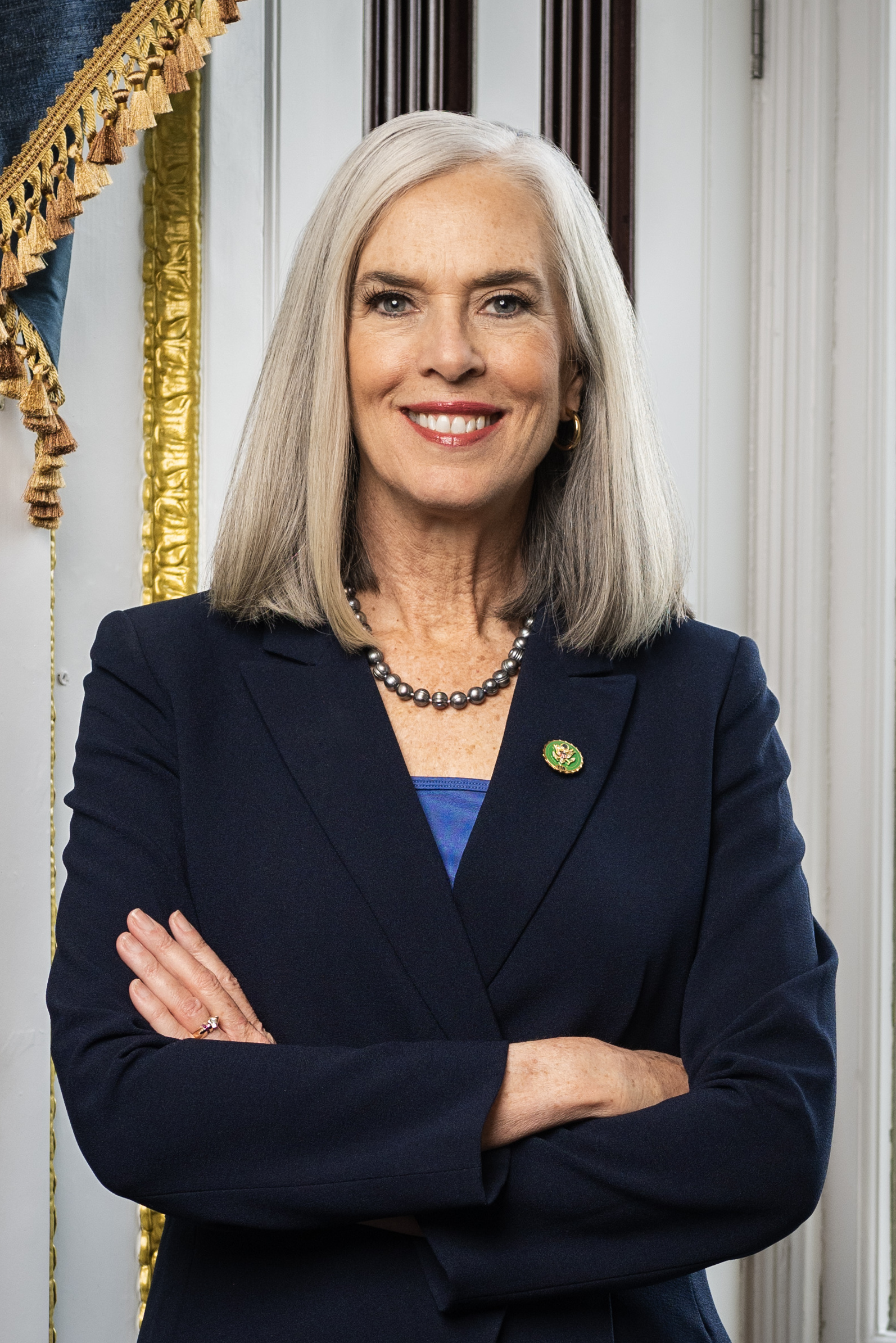
U.S. Rep. Katherine Clark

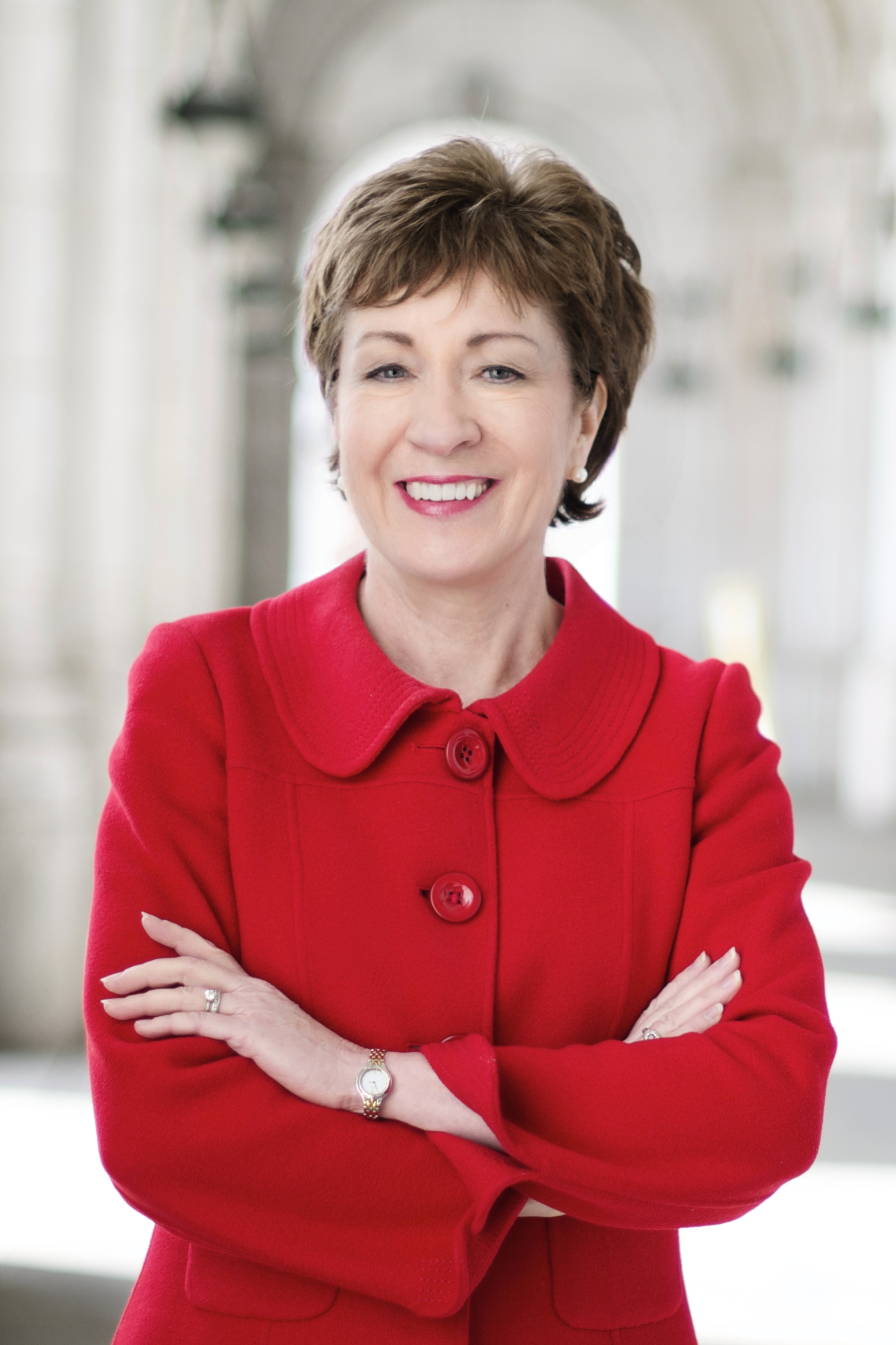
U.S. Sen. Susan Collins

- William A. Barclay (1992), New York State assemblyman
- Michael Botticelli, acting director of the Office of National Drug Control Policy
- Gregory W. Carman (1958), former United States representative from New York, and U.S. Court of International Trade judge
- Neil Chatterjee, former commissioner and chairman of the Federal Energy Regulatory Commission
- Katherine Clark (1985), current member of the United States House of Representatives from Massachusetts
- Susan Collins (1975), current United States senator of Maine
- John J. Delaney (1914), former member of the United States House of Representatives and deputy commissioner of Public Markets
- Morris Michael Edelstein (1888–1941), Polish-born American U.S. representative from New York
- Domenick L. Gabrielli, New York Supreme Court and New York Court of Appeals
- Octavius Granady (1885-1928), Caribbean-born American politician
- Joseph Lekuton, elected to the Kenyan Parliament in 2006
- George R. Malby, former United States representative from New York
- Peter McDonough, member of the New Jersey Senate
- Luther F. McKinney (1870), former United States representative from New Hampshire and United States ambassador to Colombia
- Peter Michael Pitfield, Canadian politician; held several prominent positions in Canadian national government, including senator and clerk of the Privy Council of Canada
- David M. Potts (1932), former United States representative from New York
- Irving H. Saypol (1905–1977), U.S. Attorney for the Southern District of New York and New York Supreme Court Justice
- Albert D. Shaw, former United States representative from New York
- Gerald B. H. Solomon, former United States representative from New York
- Judy Wakhungu, Kenyan ambassador to France
- Owen D. Young (1894), industrialist, businessman, lawyer; Democratic candidate for president in 1932; diplomat at the Second Reparations Conference in 1929

=== Academia ===
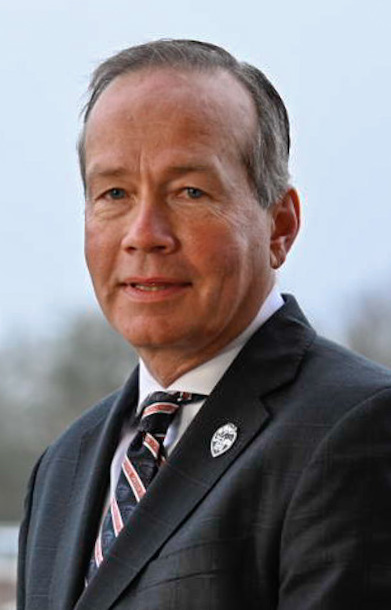
F. King Alexander

- F. King Alexander, former president of Murray State University and California State University, Long Beach; current president and chancellor of Louisiana State University
- Mark Klett (1974), Regents' Professor of Photography at Arizona State University
- John Clarence Lee (1876 AB, 1880 MA), 5th president of St. Lawrence University, president of Lombard University, and pastor of the Universalist Church of the Restoration and Gloucester Unitarian Universalist Church
- Lorrie Moore (1978), Gertrude Conaway Vanderbilt Professor of English at Vanderbilt University
- Joel Rosenbaum (1957), professor of cell biology at Yale University
- Peter Rutkoff (1964), professor of American Studies at Kenyon College
- George Stade (1955), literary critic, novelist, and professor of literature at Columbia University

=== Media and arts ===
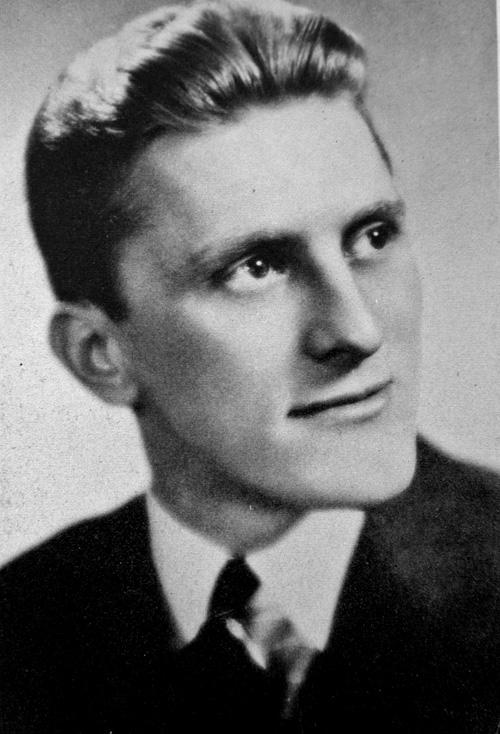
Kirk Douglas

- Irving Bacheller, pioneered the idea of newspaper syndication and wrote the first best-seller of the 20th century, Eben Holden
- Edward Morris Bowman (graduated 1865), organist, conductor, composer, and music educator
- Dan Buckley, publisher of Marvel Comics and the CEO of Marvel Entertainment's publishing division
- Tom Chiarella, magazine writer, fiction editor for Esquire magazine
- Kirk Douglas (born Issur Danielovitch; 1916–2020) , actor and filmmaker
- Pete Duel, actor known for his role in the television series Alias Smith and Jones
- J.K. Gannon (1924), wrote "I'll Be Home for Christmas" and the school's alma mater
- Eliza Putnam Heaton (1860–1919), journalist, editor
- Elizabeth Inness-Brown, novelist and professor at Saint Michael's College
- Maurice Kenny, Mohawk poet
- Martha MacCallum, anchor with Fox News Channel; hosts The Live Desk with Martha MacCallum
- Eleanor Mondale, radio personality, television host, and actor
- Lorrie Moore, short story writer and novelist, and member of the American Academy of Arts and Letters
- Viggo Mortensen (1980), actor who has appeared in many films, most notably The Lord of the Rings film trilogy
- Nick Penniman (1992), executive director of the Huffington Post Investigative Fund; founder and director of the American News Project
- Grace Potter, lead singer of the Hollywood Records recording group Grace Potter and the Nocturnals
- Jeremy Slate, actor
- Elinor Tatum (1993), publisher and editor-in-chief of the New York Amsterdam News
- Charles Henry Vail (1893), writer on socialism; Universalist clergyman
- Chester Watson, opera singer

=== Athletics ===
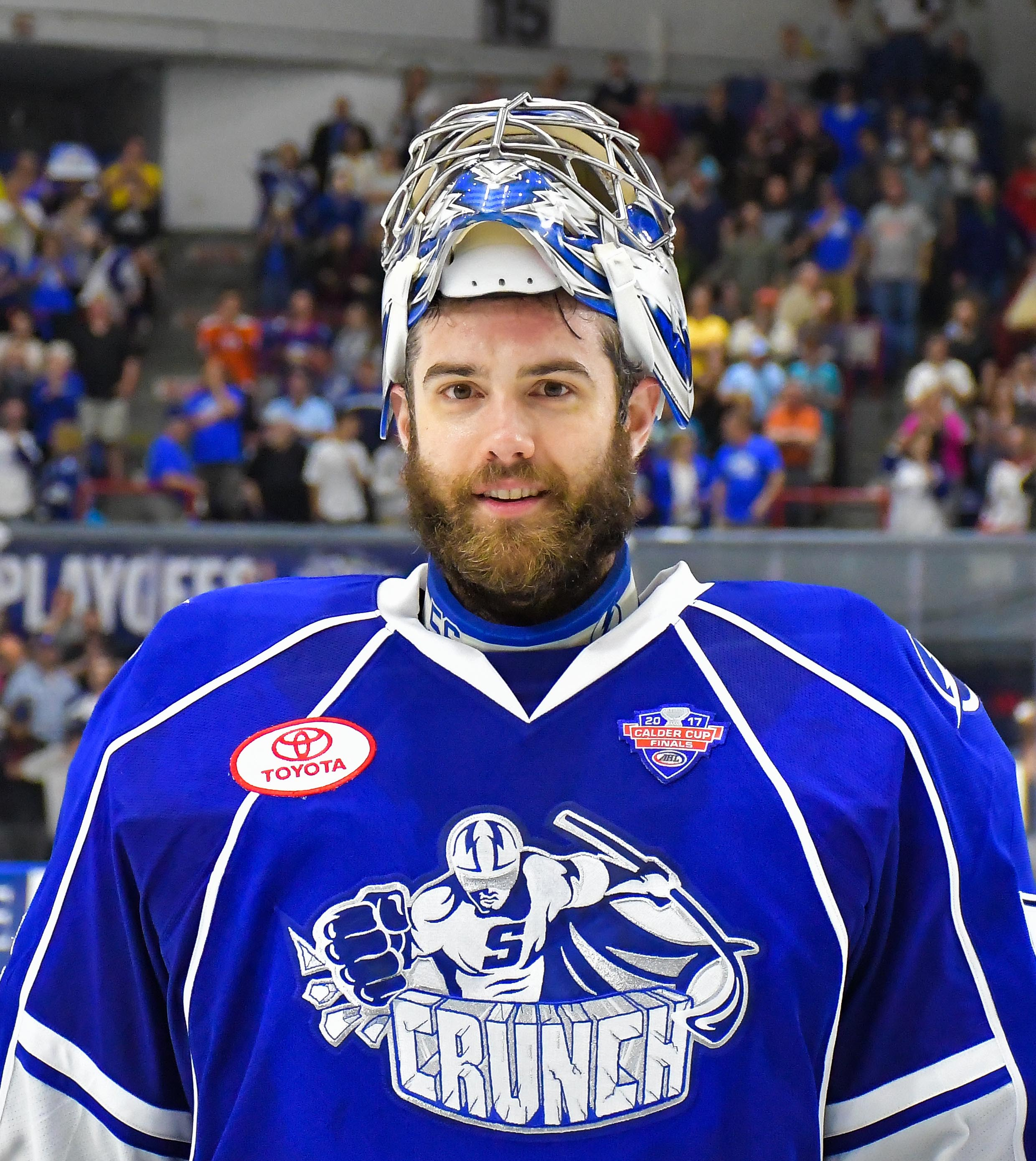
Mike McKenna

- Jamie Baker (1989), professional hockey player; radio color commentator for the San Jose Sharks
- Mike Barnett, former NHL player agent
- Fritz Bedford, competitive swimmer
- Jim Berkman (1982), all-time winningest coach in NCAA men's lacrosse history; head coach at nine-time national champion Salisbury University
- Greg Boester, former Olympic ski jumper
- Brandon Bollig (2012), former professional ice hockey player for the Chicago Blackhawks and Calgary Flames
- Geoff Boss (1988), professional racing driver in ChampCar, Indy Lights, and IMSA
- Amanda Boulier (2011) professional hockey player of Professional Women's Hockey League the Montreal Victoire
- Mo Cassara, head coach of Hofstra University men's basketball
- Eric Collins (1992), play-by-play sports announcer for the Charlotte Hornets
- Gary Croteau (1968), NHL left wing
- Emmett Davis (1981), head men's basketball coach at Colgate University
- Julia Gosling (2023), Canadian women's ice hockey Olympian
- Mike Hurlbut, former NHL player; associate head men's hockey coach at St. Lawrence University
- Dave Jennings (1974), former NFL player; former radio analyst for the New York Giants and New York Jets
- Mike Keenan, former NHL coach and general manager
- Gina Kingsbury (2004), Olympic gold medalist
- Gary Laskoski (1982), professional ice hockey player for the Los Angeles Kings
- Taylor Lum (2024), Chinese women's ice hockey Olympian
- Jacques Martin, NHL coach
- Ron Mason (1962), coach and athletic director at Michigan State University
- Brian McFarlane (1955), Canadian television sportscaster and writer
- Mike McKenna, former NHL goaltender with multiple clubs; television analyst for the Vegas Golden Knights
- Hannah Miller (2018), Chinese women's ice hockey Olympian
- Wayne Morgan (1973), head basketball Coach Iowa State University, Long Beach State University
- Rich Peverley, former NHL player with the Dallas Stars; won the Stanley Cup in 2011 while playing for the Boston Bruins; player development coordinator for the Dallas Stars
- Michael Phelan (2015), 40th head coach of Franklin & Marshall Diplomats football
- Dan Rusanowsky (1983), radio play-by-play announcer with the NHL's San Jose Sharks (1991–present)
- Hal Schumacher (1933), signed as a pitcher with the New York Giants while still a student
- Anna Segedi (2023), Chinese women's ice hockey Olympian
- Randy Sexton (1982), current assistant general manager for the NHL's Buffalo Sabres and GM of affiliate Rochester Americans
- Ray Shero (1984), current GM of the New Jersey Devils hockey team
- Greg Sutton (1999), goalkeeper in Major League Soccer
- Bill Torrey (1957), member of Hockey Hall of Fame (1995); four Stanley Cups as GM of the New York Islanders
- Thomas Vonn, former professional skier
- Susan Wakhungu-Githuku (1982), former top women's tennis player in Kenya
- John Zeiler, former professional ice hockey player for the Los Angeles Kings

=== Business ===
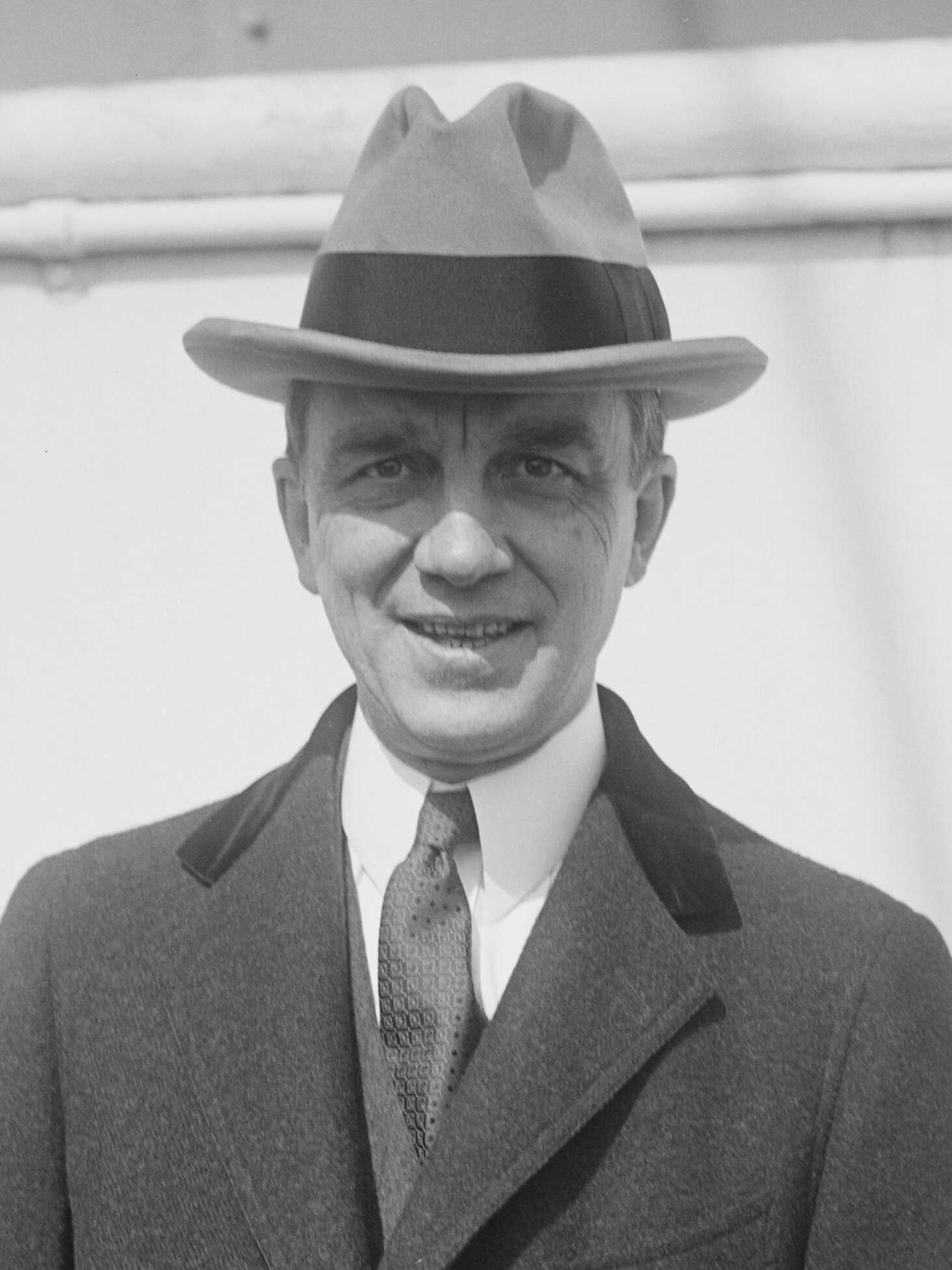
Owen D. Young

- Greg Boester, former Olympic ski jumper and banker at JPMorgan Chase
- A. Barton Hepburn (honorary 1906), United States comptroller of the currency; president of Chase National Bank
- Geoff Molson, Canadian businessman; president, chief executive officer, and co-owner of the National Hockey League's Montreal Canadiens, Evenko, Bell Centre and L'Équipe Spectra; member of the Molson family of Canada
- James Marshall Reilly, entrepreneur; author of Shake The World: It's Not About Finding a Job, It's About Creating a Life and One Great Speech: Secrets, Stories, and Perks of the Paid Speaking Industry (And How You Can Break In)
- Owen D. Young (1894), headed General Electric; founded the Radio Corporation of America
- Philip Young (1931), son of Owen D. Young; dean of Columbia Business School; United States ambassador to the Netherlands

=== Religion and philosophy ===
- Olympia Brown (1863), first woman to graduate from a regularly established theological school
- Frederick F. Campbell (1965), current Roman Catholic Bishop of Columbus
- Robert W. Castle, Episcopal priest, activist and actor
- Mariana Thompson Folsom (1870), Universalist minister, woman suffragist
- Lorenza Haynes (1874), minister, librarian, school founder
- Daniel W. Herzog (1971), former bishop of Albany, New York
- Florence E. Kollock (1848–1925), Universalist minister and lecturer
- Clarence R. Skinner (1904), Universalist minister, teacher, and dean of the Crane School of Theology at Tufts University
- Mary Traffarn Whitney (1872), minister, editor, social reformer, philanthropist, lecturer

=== Science and technology ===
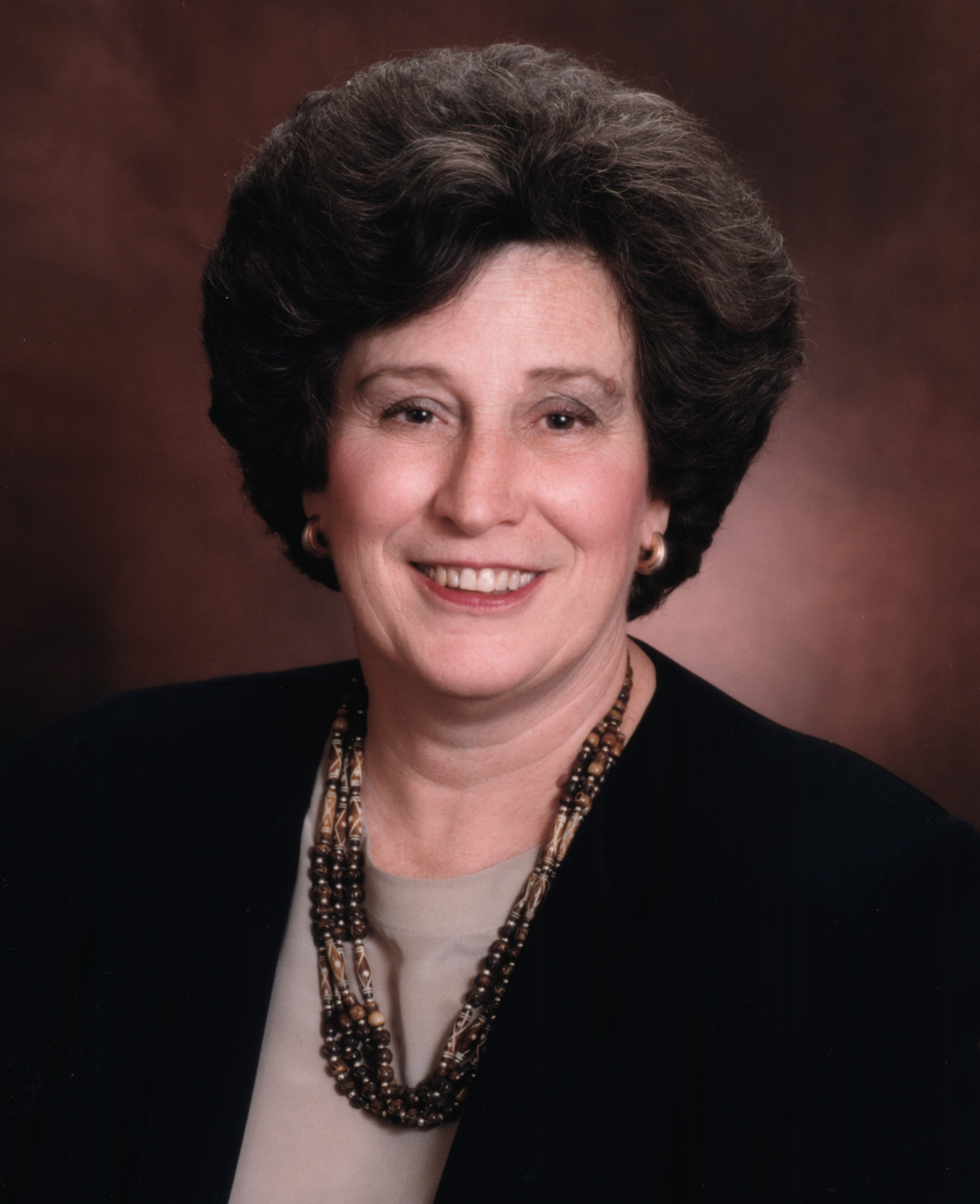
Karen R. Hitchcock

- John Clogston, groundbreaking scholar in the area of news media images of people with disabilities
- Albert P. Crary, pioneer polar geophysicist and glaciologist; first person to set foot on both the North and South Poles
- Karen R. Hitchcock, biologist; former principal of Queen's University, Kingston, Ontario, Canada
- Robert Montgomery, surgeon, director of the Transplant Institute at NYU Langone Health
- John O'Shea, scientific director at the National Institute of Arthritis and Musculoskeletal and Skin Diseases
- Derrick Pitts, chief astronomer and planetarium director for the Franklin Institute
- Les Roberts (1983), epidemiologist
- Karen Wetterhahn (1970), chemist

== See also ==
- Brooklyn Law School
- Theological School of St. Lawrence University
