= Pumpkin pie =

Dessert

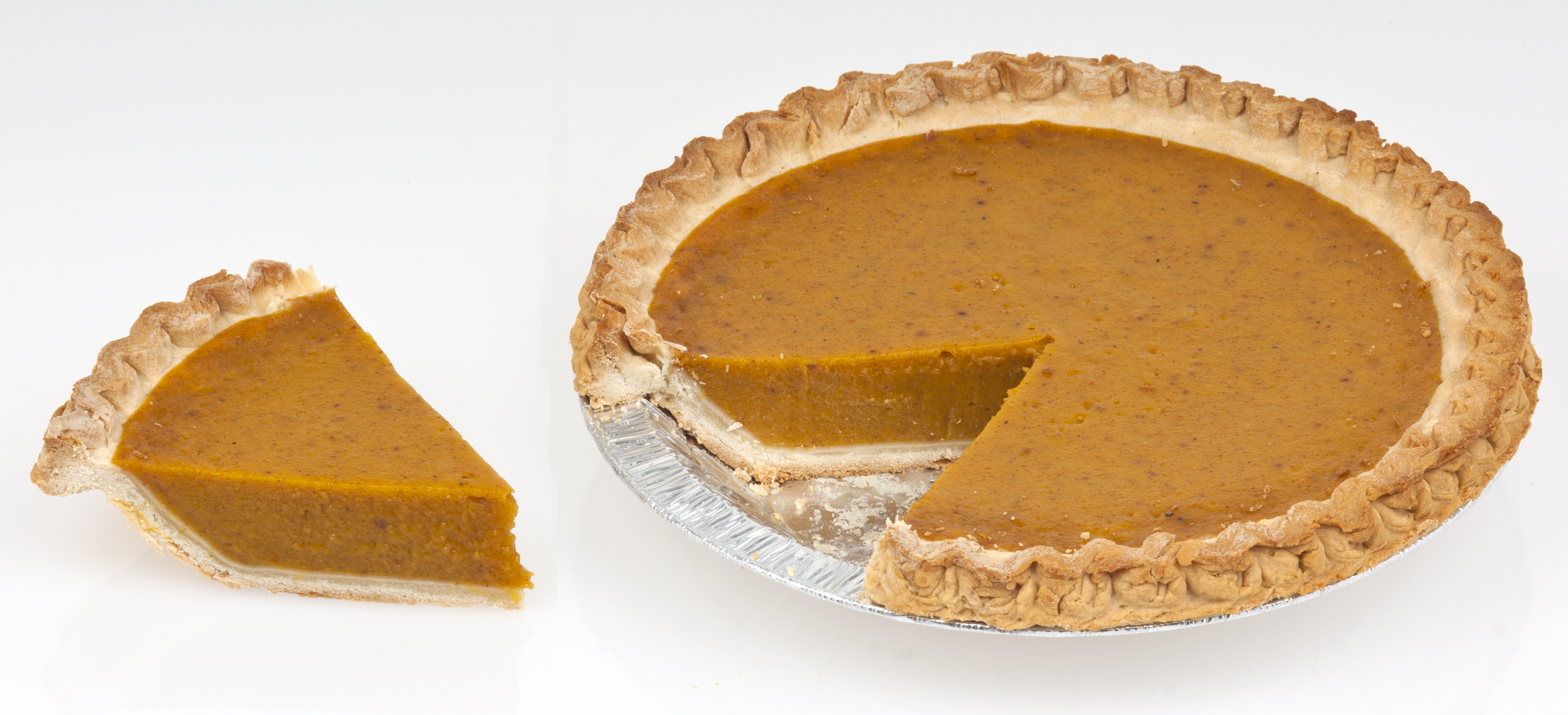
- Type: Pie
- Course: Dessert
- Place of origin: United Kingdom
- Main ingredients: Shortcrust pastry, pumpkin, eggs, condensed milk, sugar, cinnamon, ginger, nutmeg, cloves, allspice

Pumpkin pie is a dessert pie with a spiced, pumpkin-based custard filling. The pumpkin and pumpkin pie are both a symbol of harvest time, and pumpkin pie is generally eaten during the fall and early winter. In the United States and Canada it is usually prepared for Thanksgiving, Christmas, and other occasions when pumpkin is in season, generally from mid-October through November. Harvest itself often occurs during October.

The pie's filling ranges in color from orange to brown and is baked in a single pie shell, usually without a top crust. The pie is generally flavored with pumpkin pie spice, a blend that includes cinnamon, ginger, nutmeg, and cloves or allspice. Pumpkin pie is usually prepared with canned pumpkin, but fresh-cooked pumpkin can be used.

== Overview ==
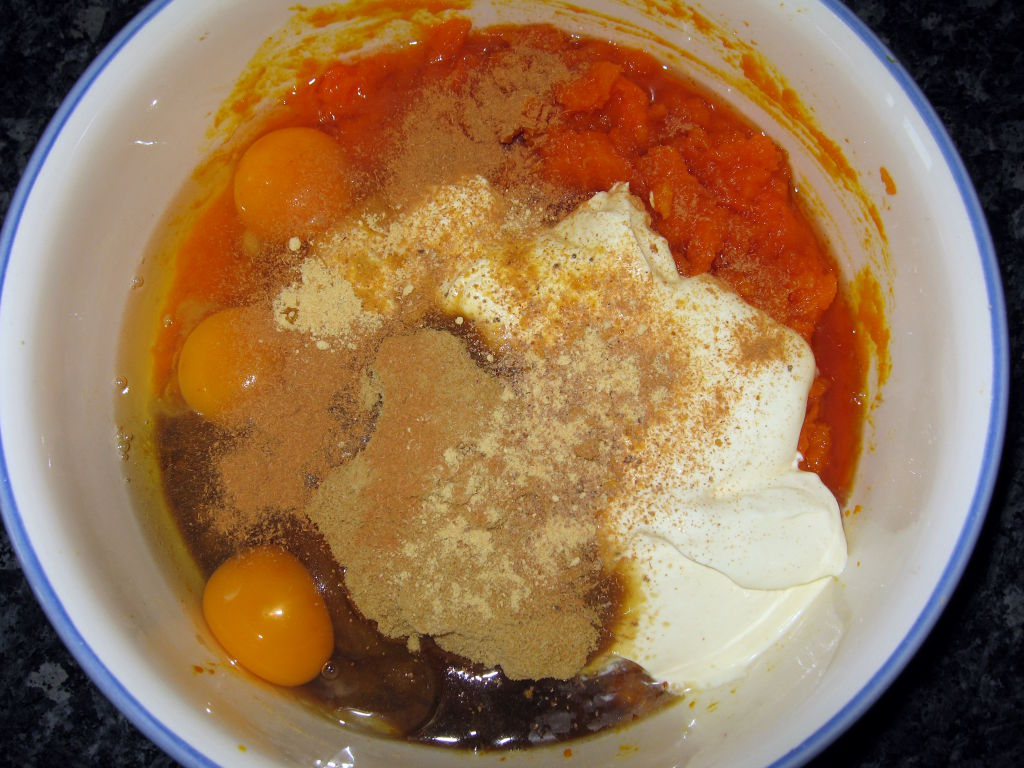
Pumpkin pie filling being prepared with eggs, flour, etc.

Cooked and puréed pumpkin flesh is mixed with eggs, evaporated milk, sugar, and spices. The pie is then baked in a pie shell and sometimes topped with whipped cream or marshmallows.

Pies made from fresh pumpkins typically use sugar pumpkins, also known as pie pumpkins, which measure about 6 to 8 inches (15 to 20 centimetres) in diameter, approximately the size of a large grapefruit. They are considerably smaller than the typically larger varieties used to carve jack o'lanterns, contain significantly less pulp, and have a less stringy texture. Other pumpkin varieties or related winter squashes, such as butternut squash, are sometimes used. The flesh is roasted until soft and puréed before being blended with the other ingredients.

Pumpkin pies are often made from canned pumpkin purée. Libby's canned pumpkin, the most popular brand, uses the Dickinson pumpkin variety of Cucurbita moschata solely, though other brands can include any of a number of varieties of Cucurbita pepo or Cucurbita maxima. Packaged pumpkin pie filling with sugar and spices already included is also sold. Sweet potato pie uses a similar recipe, with mashed sweet potato instead of pumpkin.

== History ==
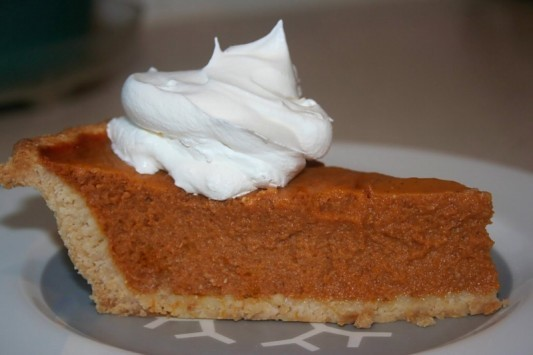
A slice of homemade pumpkin pie with whipped cream

The pumpkin is native to North America. The pumpkin was an early export to France; from there it was introduced to Tudor England, and the flesh of the "pompion" was quickly accepted as pie filling. The Columbian exchange is credited with the fusion of ingredients needed to create pumpkin pie, including European wheat, North American pumpkins, and sugar from the Canary Islands. During the seventeenth century, pumpkin pie recipes with the pumpkin sliced, fried and then baked in a pie crust with butter, sugar and raisins could be found in English cookbooks, such as Hannah Woolley's The Gentlewoman's Companion and The Queen-like Closet Pumpkin "pies" made by early American colonists were more likely to be a savory soup made and served in a pumpkin than a sweet custard in a crust. Pumpkins were also stewed and made into ale by colonists. An early appearance of a more modern, custard-like pumpkin pie was in American Cookery, a cookbook published in 1796. It used a sweet custard filling in a pie crust, with spices similar to the ones used today.

It was not until the early nineteenth century that recipes appeared in Canadian cookbooks, or that pumpkin pie became a common addition to the Thanksgiving dinner. The Pilgrims brought the pumpkin pie back to New England after learning recipes from the Northeastern Native Americans in 1621. In the United States after the Civil War, the pumpkin pie was resisted in Southern states as a symbol of Yankee culture imposed on the South, where there was no tradition of eating pumpkin pie. Many Southern cooks instead made sweet potato pie, or added bourbon and pecans to give the pumpkin pie a Southern touch.

Today, throughout much of Canada and the United States, it is traditional to serve pumpkin pie after Thanksgiving dinner and sometimes while celebrating Christmas.

Pumpkin pies were discouraged from Thanksgiving dinners in the United States in 1947 as part of a voluntary egg rationing campaign promoted by the Truman Administration, mainly because of the eggs used in the recipe. This was a part of President Truman's Citizen's Food Committee task force, designed to ration food consumption in the United States in hopes to provide more foreign food assistance to Europe post World War II. Part of the campaign included an "Egg-less & Poultry-less Thursday", which began in October 1947, and with Thanksgiving Day always occurring on a Thursday, there was a considerable backlash among American consumers against this. Truman was true to his word, and no pumpkin pie was served at the White House for Thanksgiving in 1947.

== In popular culture ==
=== Poetry ===
- Lydia Maria Child's Thanksgiving poem "Over the River and Through the Wood" (1844) mentions pumpkin pie: "Hurrah for the fun! Is the pudding done? / Hurrah for the pumpkin pie!"
- Mathew Franklin Whittier, signing as "A Yankee," wrote in his poem "Song of the Pumpkin" (1846):

Ah! on Thanksday, when from East and from West,

From North and from South comes the pilgrim and guest;
When the gray-haired New Englander sees round his board
The old broken links of affection restored;
When the care-wearied man seeks his mother once more,
And the worn matron smiles where the girl smiled before;
What moistens the lip and what brightens the eye,

What calls back the past, like the rich Pumpkin pie?

=== Songs ===
- Oscar Ferdinand Telgmann and George Frederick Cameron wrote the song "Farewell O Fragrant Pumpkin Pie" in the opera Leo, the Royal Cadet (1889):

Farewell, O fragrant pumpkin pie!
Dyspeptic pork, adieu!
Though to the college halls I hie.
On field of battle though I die, my latest sob, my latest sigh
shall wafted be to you!
And thou, O doughnut rare and rich and fried divinely brown!
Thy form shall fill a noble niche in memory's chamber whilst I pitch
my tent beside the river which rolls on through Kingston town.
And my Love—my little Nell,
the apple of my eye to thee how can I say farewell?
I love thee more than I can tell;

I love thee more than anything—but—pie!

- The Christmas-themed song "There's No Place Like Home for the Holidays" makes a reference to homemade pumpkin pie being looked forward to by a man returning to his family's home in Pennsylvania.
- The popular Christmas song "Rockin' Around the Christmas Tree" contains the lyric, "Later we'll have some pumpkin pie/And we'll do some caroling".
- "Sleigh Ride", another popular Christmas song, also mentions sitting around a fire after being out in the snow and eating pumpkin pie.

== Records ==
The world's largest pumpkin pie was made in New Bremen, Ohio, at the New Bremen Pumpkinfest on September 25, 2010. The pie consisted of 1,212 pounds (550 kilograms) of canned pumpkin, 109 US gallons (410 litres) of evaporated milk, 2,796 eggs, 7 lb (3.2 kg) of salt, 14 1/2 lb (6.6 kg) of cinnamon, and 525 lb (238 kg) of sugar. The final pie weighed 3,699 lb (1,678 kg) and measured 20 ft (6 m) in diameter.

The Guinness World Record for the most pumpkin pie consumed is 50 slices in 10 minutes and belongs to Molly Schuyler. She surpassed the previous record, which was her own, of 48 slices in 10 minutes.

== Image gallery ==
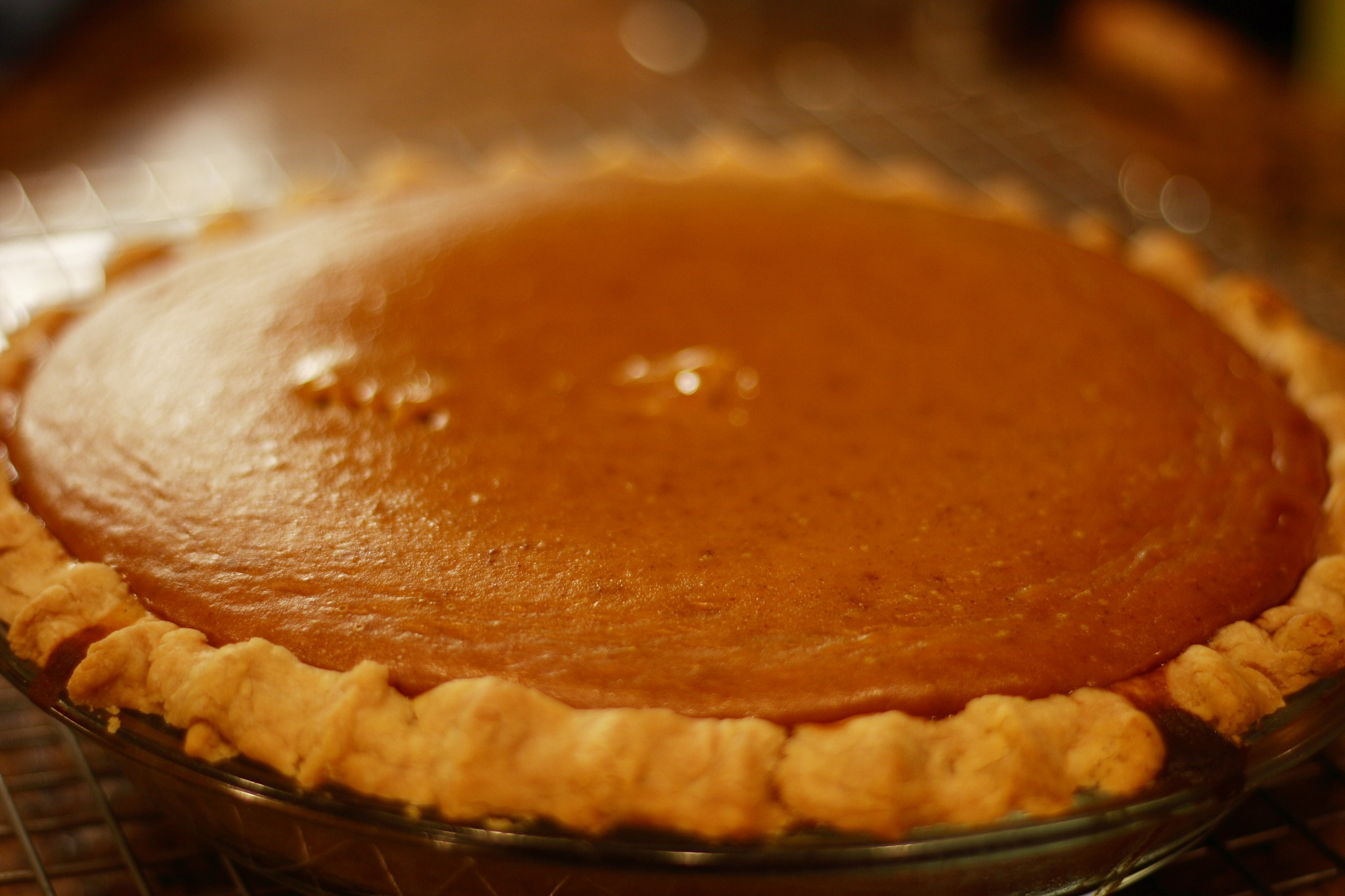
A homemade pumpkin pie prepared using fresh pumpkin

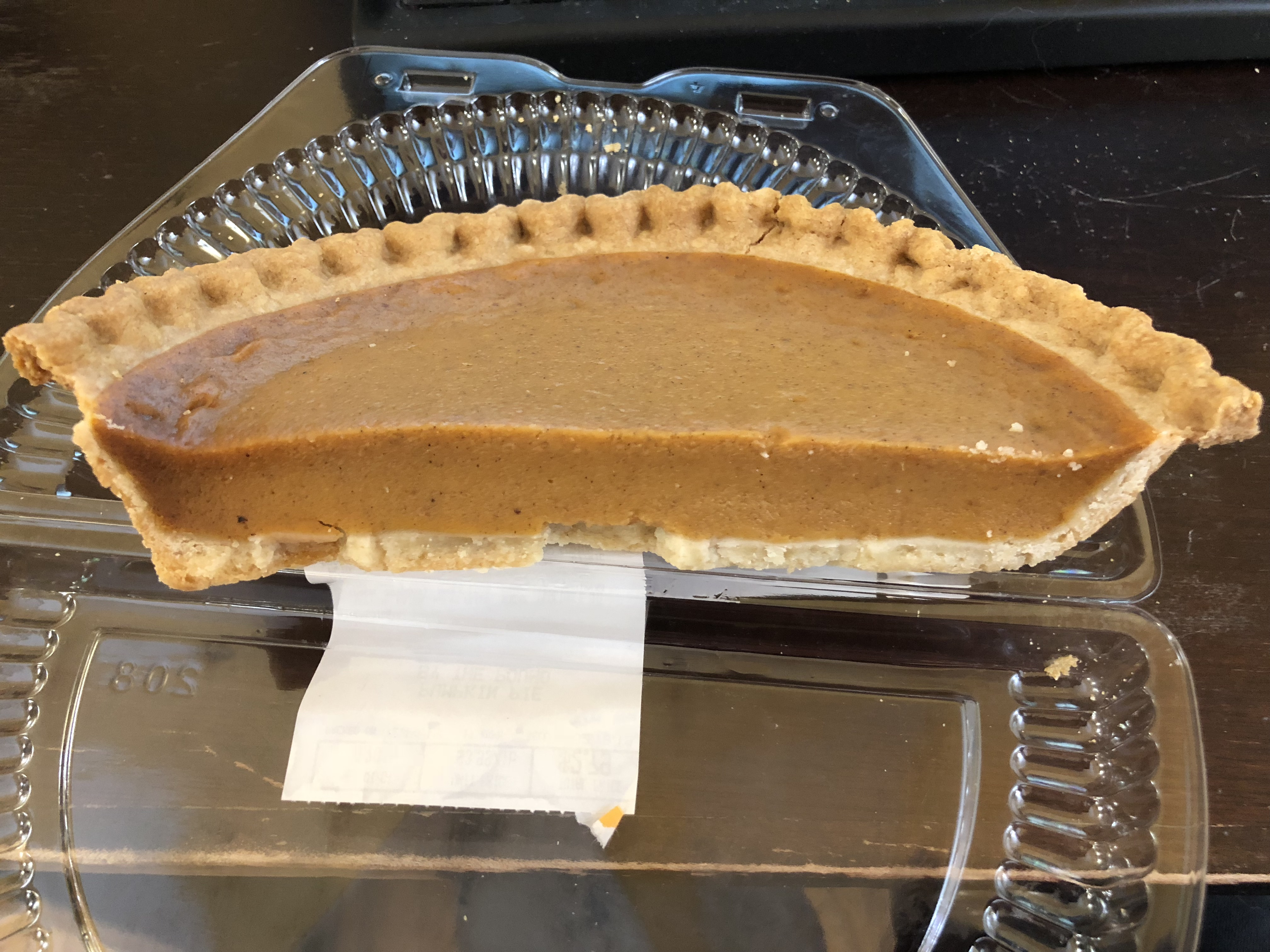
Cross-section view of a commercially prepared pumpkin pie

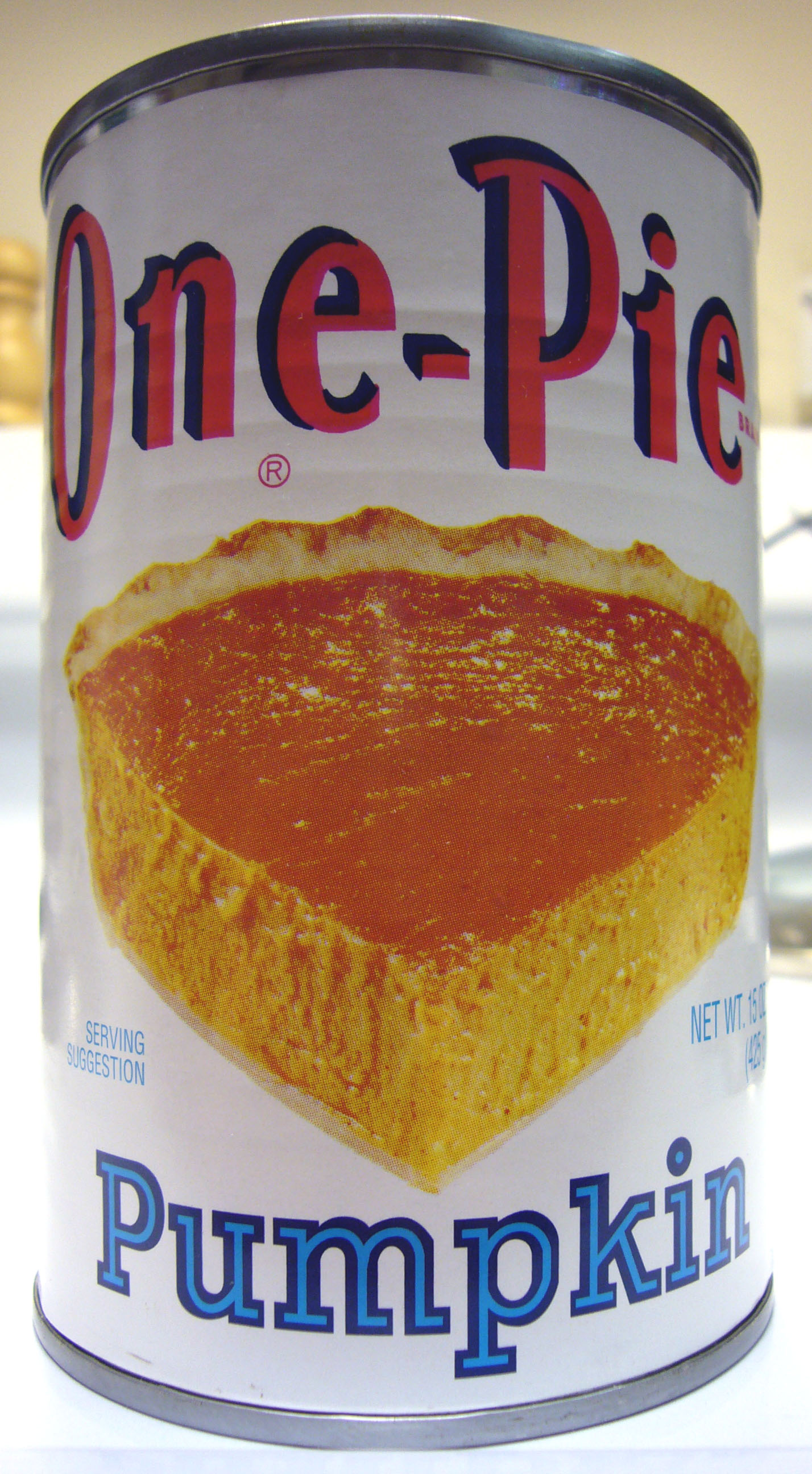
A can of pureed pumpkin, typically used as the main ingredient in the pie filling

== See also ==
- List of pies
- List of squash and pumpkin dishes
