= Under30Media =

- Website type: Business, Entrepreneurship, Motivational
- Available in: English
- Website: Under30Media.com
- Commercial: Yes
- Launched: 2008
- Current status: Active

Under30Media is a United States business and entrepreneurship website. It was launched in 2008 and based in New York City. The brand comprises Under30CEO, Under30Finance, Under30Careers, and Under30Experiences.

== Description ==
Founded by Jared O’Toole and Matt Wilson, Under30Media is the brand under which Under30CEO, Under30Finance, Under30Careers, and Under30Experiences fall. They provide educational resources and mentorship to young entrepreneurs.

Their revenue model is based on subscription, advertising, and consulting services; the site attracts roughly 150,000 pageviews and 75,000 visitors per month. They have been cited by publications such as Business Insider and Forbes.

== Brands ==
=== Under30CEO ===
Under30CEO is a news media site offering young entrepreneurs tools and resources. Featured experts include James Marshall Reilly, Matt Mickiewicz, and Young Entrepreneur Council. On April 15, 2016, Under30CEO was acquired by Rich20Something Media, Inc.

=== Under30Experiences ===
Under30Experiences is a professional retreat that has organized group trips for entrepreneurs in Iceland, Costa Rica, and Nicaragua. It was written about in The New York Times, and Forbes listed it as one of the "4 Professional Retreats to Explore in 2013."
