= Kar' Assaly =

Traditional Egyptian pumpkin dessert

Kar' Assaly (Arabic: قرع عسلي) is an Egyptian dessert dish made from pumpkin. It has been compared to pumpkin pie, although both differ in texture and preparation.

Kar' Assaly is prepared with pumpkin, cooked with sugar. After that, it is layered with nuts, raisins, or coconut and topped with a creamy béchamel sauce.

== Preparation ==
The dessert is prepared by cooking pumpkin pieces slowly until it becomes soft. Sugar is added. The cooked pumpkin is then spread in a baking dish and layered with raisins, nuts, coconut flakes, cinnamon, or cardamom.

Then, the béchamel sauce made from milk, flour, butter, and sugar is poured over the pumpkin mixture before baking until golden brown.

Because of cooking variations, some people's recipes use butternut squash or sweet potatoes instead of pumpkin, while others include additional spices or toppings such as honey, cream, or ice cream.

== Cultural significance ==
Kar' Assaly is considered part of traditional Egyptian home cuisine and is often prepared during cooler seasons and festive gatherings.

== See also ==
- Egyptian cuisine
- Pumpkin pie
- Middle Eastern cuisine
