= Dickinson pumpkin =

Variety of pumpkin

The Dickinson pumpkin is a cultivar of Cucurbita moschata. The majority of canned pumpkin in the United States is made from Dickinson pumpkin, making it the most common source of pumpkin pie filling.

== History ==
Dickinson pumpkins were first cultivated in the US state of Kentucky in the early 19th century and were named after farmer Elijah Dickinson. He brought the pumpkin to central Illinois, where it grew well. The industry is centered on Morton, Illinois. Pumpkins grow well in the area due to the dark, rich soil and mild climate. In the 1920s, a processing plant was built to handle the harvest. It was later acquired by the Chicago-based Libby's. The company has a proprietary varietal that features extra dense, sweet flesh. The plant produces as much as 95% of the canned pumpkin in the United States, making it the most common source of pumpkin pie filling. The company says that it annually produces enough cans to make 90 million pumpkin pies.

In 2009, heavy rains caused a delay in the harvest. Libby's warned that its inventory of canned pumpkin might not meet demand for Thanksgiving pies. In 2015, heavy spring rains caused a poor harvest leading to a Christmas canned-pumpkin shortage.

== Characteristics ==
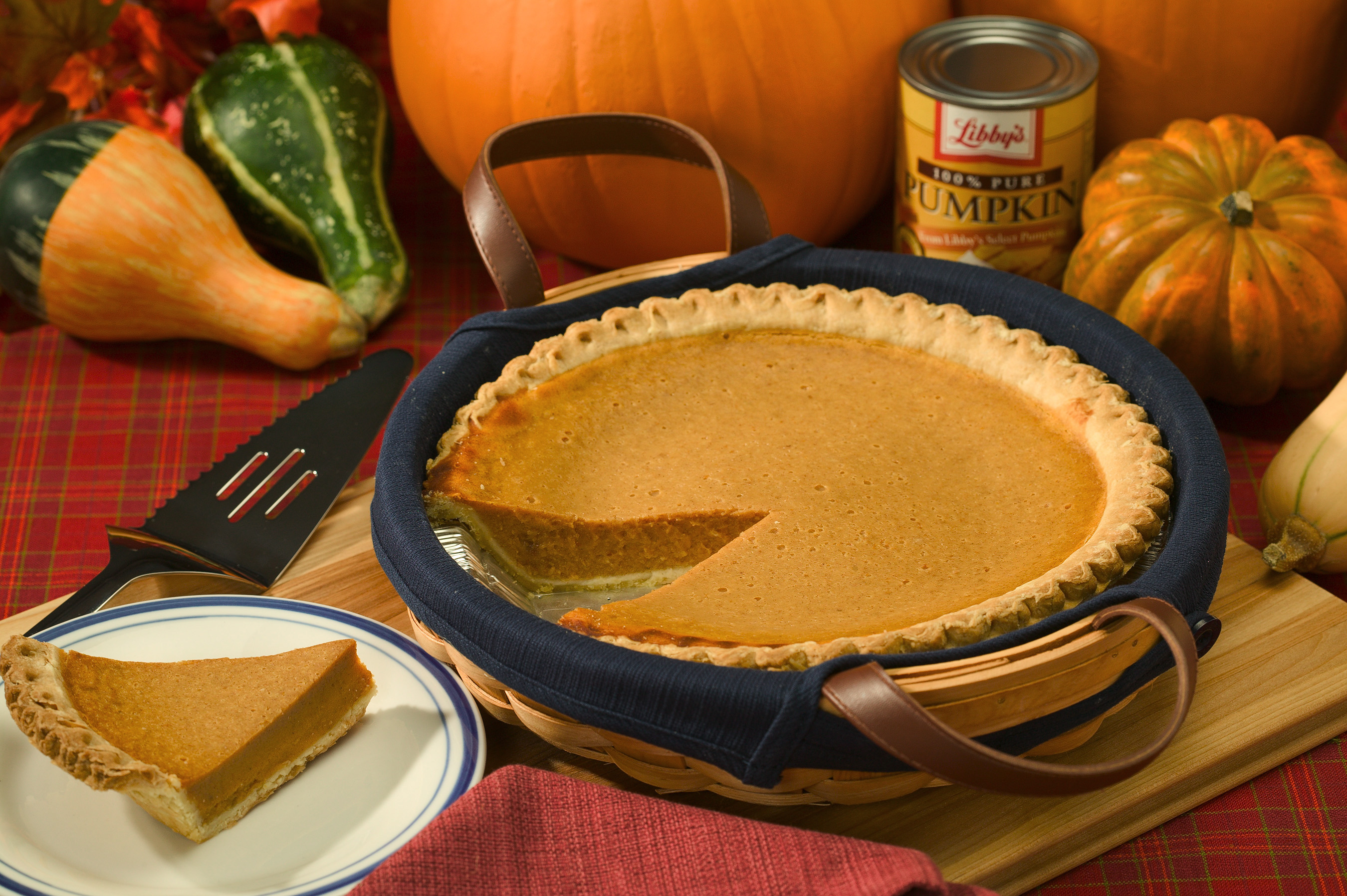
Pumpkin pie

Dickinson pumpkins typically weigh between 10 and 14 pounds (4.5 and 6.4 kg). They have a tall, blocky, oblong shape with a sandy tan colored skin, similar to the outer rind of a butternut squash. The flesh is orange and is dry and fine-grained, making it ideal for baking. According to food writer Melissa Clark, they taste like a cross between a butternut squash and a kabocha.

The identification of Dickinsons as pumpkins versus squash has been subject to debate.
