= Owen D. Young =

American industrialist, lawyer, and diplomat (1874–1962)

Owen Young
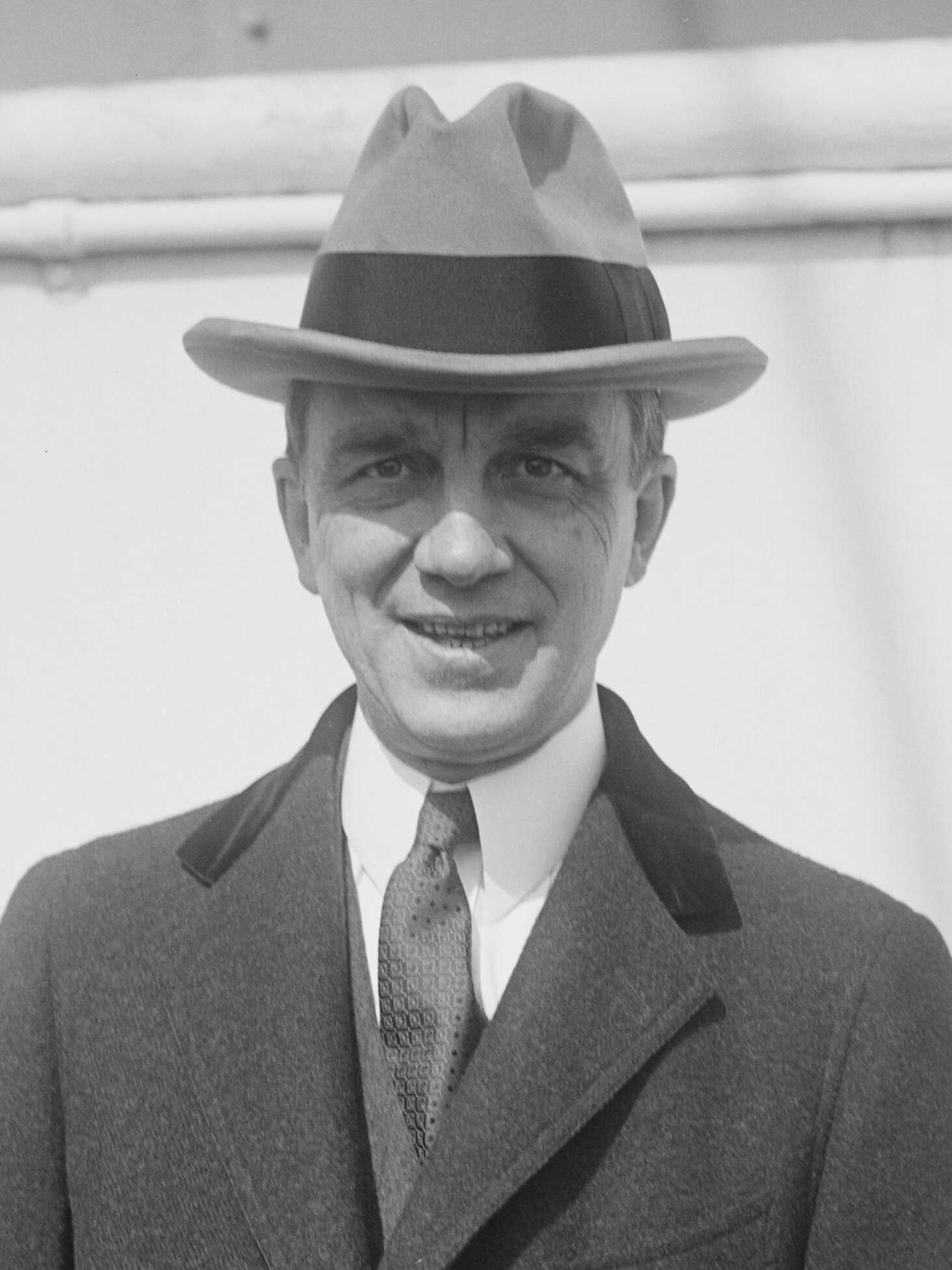
- Young, 1928
- Born: October 27, 1874; Stark, New York, U.S.
- Died: July 11, 1962 (aged 87); St. Augustine, Florida, U.S.
- Education: St. Lawrence University (BA); Boston University (LLB)
- Political party: Democratic

Owen D. Young (October 27, 1874 – July 11, 1962) was an American industrialist, businessman, lawyer and diplomat at the Second Reparations Conference (SRC) in 1929 as a member of the Reparation Commission.

He is known for the eponymous Young Plan devised in 1929 to settle Germany's World War I debt and for the creation of the Radio Corporation of America. Young founded RCA as a subsidiary of General Electric in 1919; he became its first chairman and continued in that position until 1929. RCA was separated into as another traded company in 1932. This was although they still held a large portion of RCA shares and liquidated by GE in 1986.

== Early life and family ==
Owen D. Young was born on October 27, 1874, on a small farmhouse in the village of Van Hornesville, Town of Stark, New York. His parents’ names were Jacob Smith Young and Ida Brandow and they worked the farm that his grandfather owned. Owen was an only child, his parents lost their first born son before he was born, and his birth was something rejoiced. He was the first male of the family to have a name that was not biblical since they had first arrived in 1750, driven from the Palatinate on the Rhine in Germany by constant war and religious persecution. They were taken in by the Protestant Queen Anne in England, sent to New York in 1710 to act to provide naval stores for the British fleet along the Hudson River, and eventually moving north and west, taking land from the Native Americans before settling along the Mohawk.

Owen went to school for the first time in the spring of 1881. He was six years old, and had always been inclined to books and studying. He had a teacher, Menzo McEwan, who taught him for years, and would eventually be responsible for Owen going to East Springfield, one of the few secondary schools that he could afford. Of course, it was not too close to Van Hornesville, which had few secondary education opportunities near it. This took him away from the farm, where his help was needed, but his parents supported his pursuit of education to the point of later mortgaging the farm to send him to St. Lawrence University at Canton, New York.

He married Josephine Sheldon Edmonds (1870–1935) on June 13, 1898, in Southbridge, Massachusetts. A few years after Josephine died, he married the fashion designer and businesswoman Louise Powis Clark (1887–1965), a widow with three children.

=== Children ===
- Charles Jacob Young (December 17, 1899 – October 2, 1987), Scientist and inventor at RCA
- John Young (August 13, 1902 – August 21, 1926), (killed in a train accident)
- Josephine Young (February 16, 1907 – January 8, 1990), who became a poet and novelist, writing as Josephine Young Case
- Philip Young (May 9, 1910 – January 15, 1987), who became Dean of the Columbia Business School (1948–1953), Chairman of the Civil Service Commission (1953–1957), and United States Ambassador to the Netherlands (1957–1960)
- Richard Young (June 23, 1919 – November 18, 2011), Attorney, expert on international and maritime law, and law professor

== Education ==
East Springfield Academy was a small coeducational school and Young greatly enjoyed his time there, making lifelong friends; later in life, he tried to attend all of the reunions. St. Lawrence was a small institute struggling to survive and in serious need of both money and students and Owen Young was a good candidate. It was still expensive enough to cause some hesitance, however. With his father getting on in years, Owen was needed on the farm more than ever. His parents were eventually convinced by the president of the college.

It was there that Young was able to grow as a person in both his education and his faith. He discovered Universalism, which allowed for more intellectual freedom, separate from the gloom and hellfire permeating other Christian sects. Young remained a student from September 1890 before becoming an 1894 graduate of St. Lawrence University, on June 27. He completed the three-year law course at Boston University in two years, graduating cum laude in 1896.

After graduation he joined lawyer Charles H. Tyler and ten years later became a partner in that Boston law firm. They were involved in litigation cases between major companies. During college, he not only became a brother of the Beta Theta Pi fraternity, but he also met his future wife Josephine Sheldon Edmonds, an 1886 Radcliffe graduate. He married her in 1898, and she eventually bore him five children.

== Career ==
Young represented Stone and Webster in a successful case against GE around 1911 and through that case came to the attention of Charles A. Coffin, the first president of General Electric. After the death of GE's General Counsel Hinsdill Parsons in April 1912, Coffin invited Young to become the company's Chief Counsel and Young moved to Schenectady. He became GE's president in 1922 and then in the same year was appointed chairman, serving in that position until 1939. Under his guidance and teaming with president Gerard Swope, GE shifted into the extensive manufacturing of home electrical appliances, establishing the company as a leader in this field and speeding the mass electrification of farms, factories and transportation systems within the US.

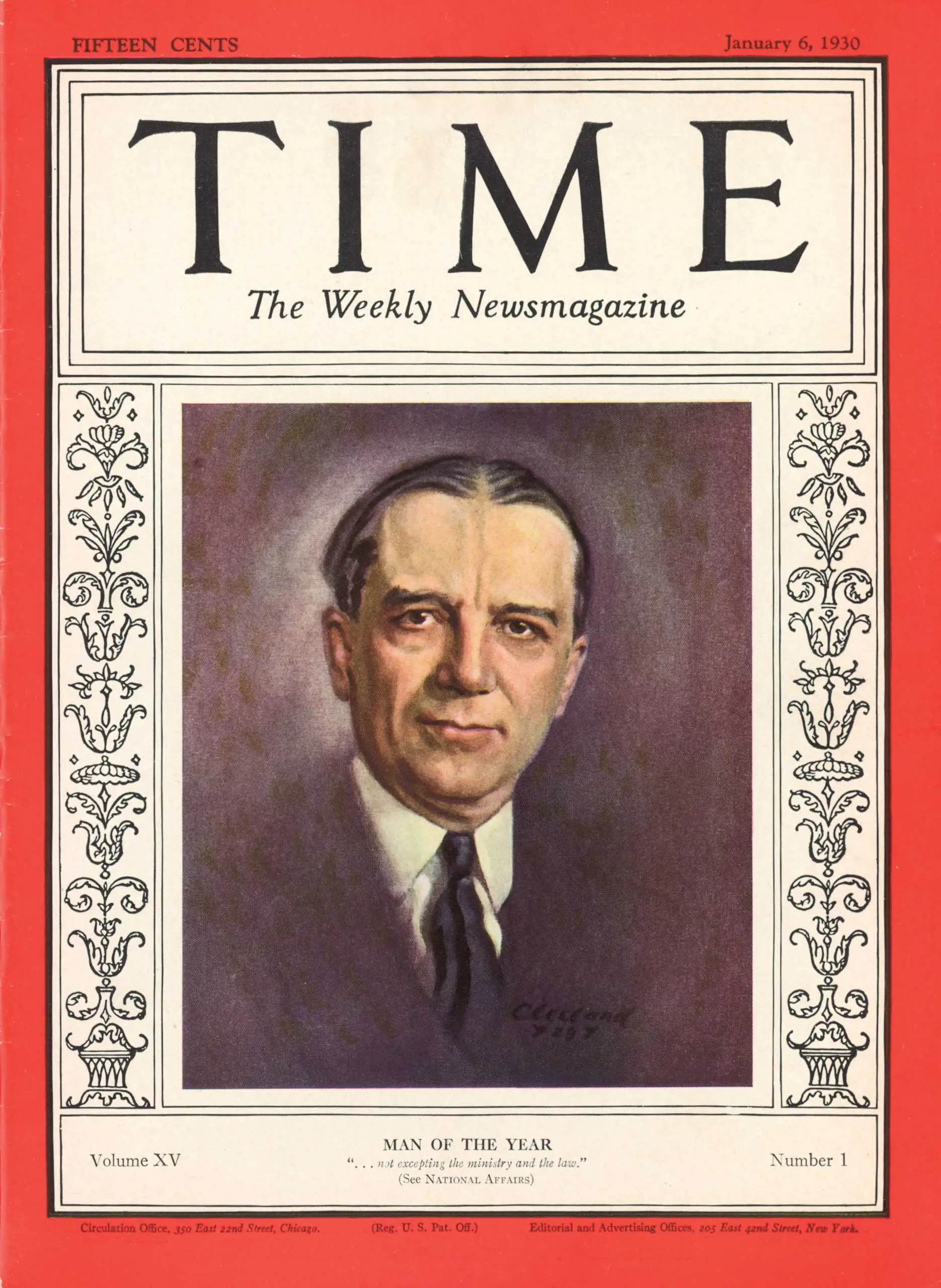
Time cover, 6 Jan 1930

In 1919, at the request of the government, he created the Radio Corporation of America (RCA) to combat the threat of British control over the world's radio communications against America's struggling radio industry. He became its augmentation chairman and served in that position until 1929, helping to establish America's lead in the burgeoning technology of radio, making RCA the largest radio company in the world. In 1928, he was appointed to the board of trustees of the Rockefeller Foundation under a major reorganization of that institution, serving on that board also up to 1939.

Young's participation in President Woodrow Wilson's Second Industrial Conference following World War I marked the beginning of his counseling of five U.S. presidents. In 1924, he coauthored the Dawes Plan, which provided for a reduction in the annual amount of German reparations. After the Allied Powers had settled their war debts to Washington, a new international body met beginning in 1928 to consider a program for the final release of German obligations; Young acted as chairman. Germany's total reparations were reduced and spread over 59 annual payments. After establishing this "Young Plan", Young was named Time Magazine's Man of the Year in 1929. The Young Plan collapsed with the coming of the Great Depression. Young was also instrumental in plans for a state university system in New York. In 1932, he was a candidate for the Democratic presidential nomination. He did not campaign actively, but his friends promoted his candidacy beginning in 1930 and at the 1932 Democratic National Convention. He was highly regarded by candidates Alfred E. Smith and Franklin D. Roosevelt, and some convention observers speculated that they would support Young in the event of a convention deadlock.

=== Retirement ===
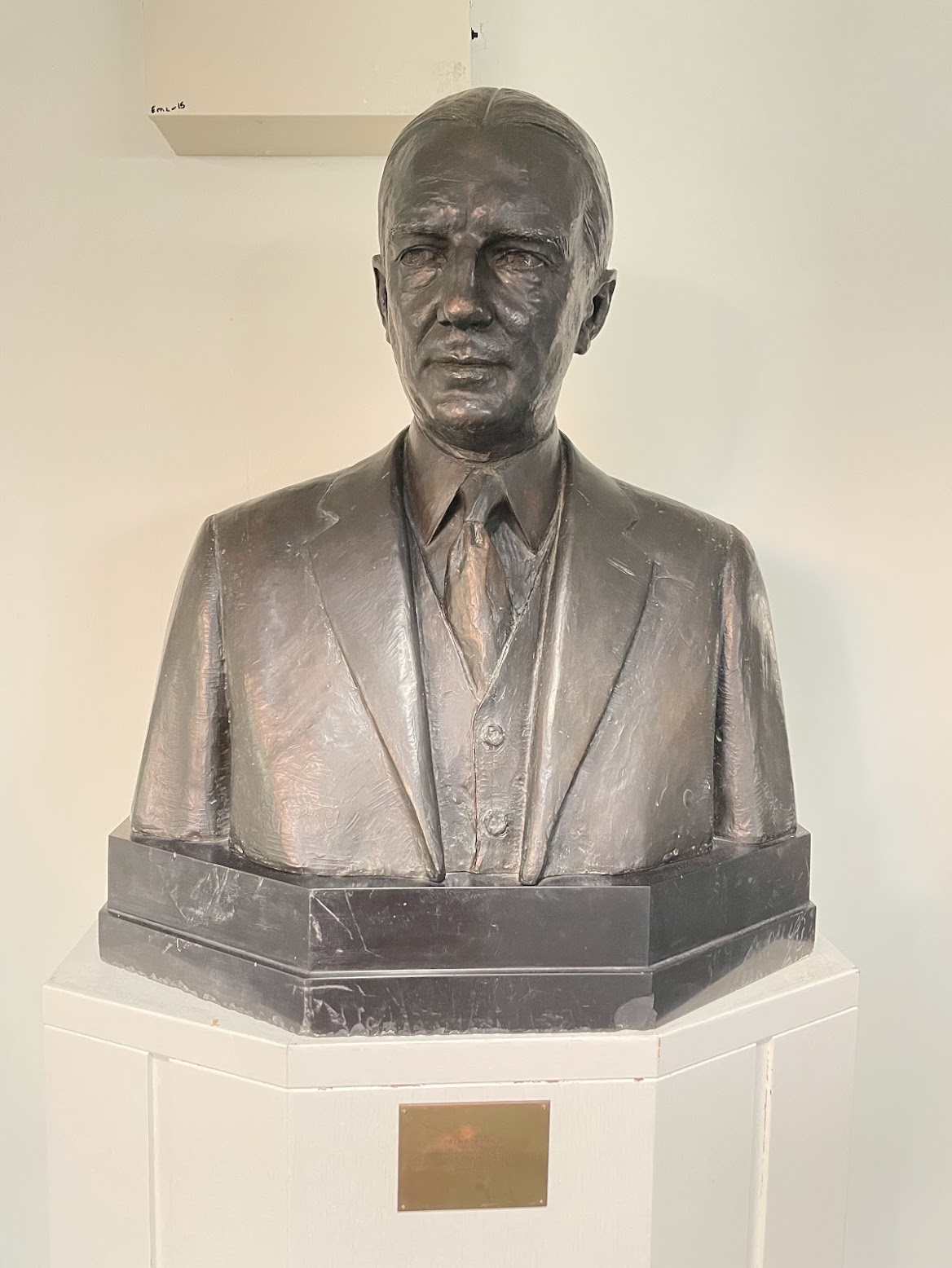
A bust of Young located in the library named after him at SLU

In 1930, he built the Van Hornesville, New York, Central School in his hometown to consolidate all the small rural schools in the area. In 1963, it was renamed Owen D. Young Central School in his honor. Long active in education, Young was a trustee of St. Lawrence University from 1912 to 1934, serving as president of the board the last 10 years. The main library of the university is named in his honor.

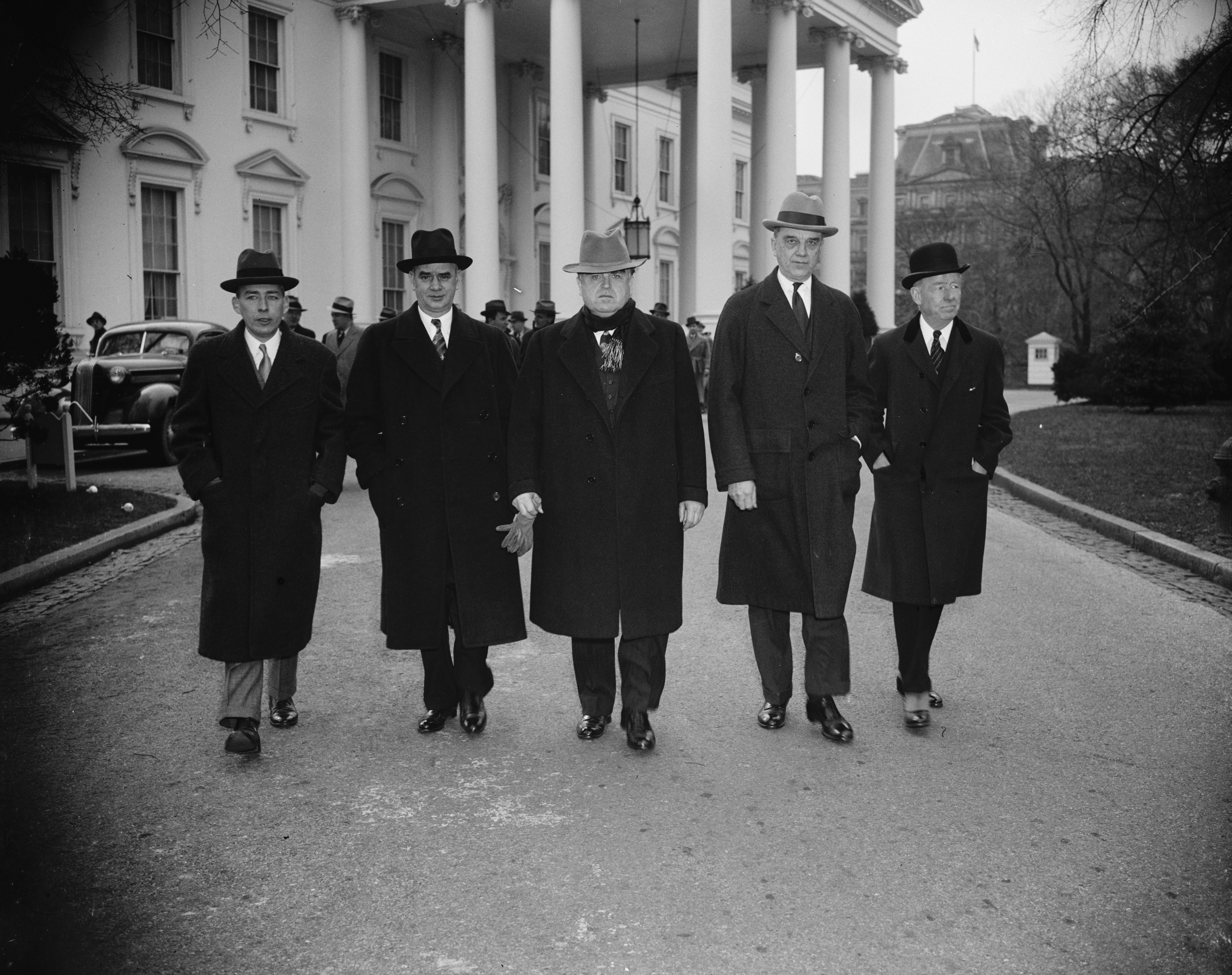
Labor and business leaders leaving the White House after a meeting with President Franklin D. Roosevelt, January 14, 1938. (L-R): Adolf A. Berle, Philip Murray, John L. Lewis, Owen D. Young, Thomas W. Lamont.

After Young married Louise Powis Clark in 1937, the couple created a winter estate in Florida that included a formal garden and citrus stand along State Road A1A. In 1965, Louise gifted the estate to the State of Florida, and it is now the site of Washington Oaks Gardens State Park.

In 1939, he formally retired to the family farm in New York, where he began dairy farming. He died in Florida on July 11, 1962, following several months of poor health.

== Legacy ==
More than 20 colleges awarded him honorary degrees. He was an elected Member of both the American Philosophical Society and the American Academy of Arts and Sciences. Long interested in education, he was a member of the New York State Board of Regents, governing body of New York's educational system, until 1946. Then, New York Governor Thomas E. Dewey called upon him to head the state commission that laid the groundwork for the State University of New York system. Although the commission represented a wide range of views and opinions, Young achieved a surprising unanimity that resulted in a report containing recommendations adopted by the legislature. He was inducted into the Junior Achievement U.S. Business Hall of Fame in 1981 and the Consumer Technology Hall of Fame in 2019.

The School district in Van Hornesville, New York is named in honor of him.

== See also ==
- List of Beta Theta Pi members
- List of Boston University School of Law alumni
- List of commencement speakers at Harvard University
- List of covers of Time magazine (1920s) / (1930s)
- List of St. Lawrence University people
- List of Unitarians, Universalists, and Unitarian Universalists
- List of University of Florida honorary degree recipients

== References and further reading ==
- Jones, Kenneth Paul, ed. U.S. Diplomats in Europe, 1919–41 (ABC-CLIO. 1981) online on Young's role in Europe, pp 43–62..
- Tarbell, Ida M. (1932). Owen D. Young: A new type of industrial leader. Macmillan Company. ISBN 978-0-518-19069-1.
- Case, Josephine Young (1982). Owen D. Young and American enterprise: A biography. D.R. Godine. ISBN 978-0-87923-360-0.
- Szladits, Lola L. (1974). Owen D. Young. Readex Books. ISBN 978-0-87104-253-8.
- Hammond, John Winthrop. Men and Volts, the Story of General Electric, published 1941. Citations: came to Schenectady – 360; Chairman of the Board – 382; retired in 1939 – 394; General Counsel 359,381; Report to Temporary National Economic Committee – 397.

== Notes ==
Business positions
Preceded by Charles A. Coffin	Chairman of General Electric; 1922–1940	Succeeded by Philip D. Reed
Preceded by Philip D. Reed	Chairman of General Electric; 1942–1945	Succeeded by Philip D. Reed
Awards and achievements
Preceded by Harry S. New	Cover of Time; February 23, 1925	Succeeded by Amy Lowell
