= Kingston Symphony Orchestra =

The Kingston Symphony Orchestra was a Canadian orchestra based in Kingston, Ontario that was active from 1914 to 1936. It was founded by composer and conductor Oscar Ferdinand Telgmann, who served as the ensembles only conductor. When he retired in 1936 the orchestra disbanded.
