= Philip D. Reed =

American corporate executive (1899–1989)

Philip D. Reed (1899–1989) was president and chief executive officer of General Electric Company from 1940 to 1942 and from 1945 to 1959.

== Education and early career ==
Reed was born in Milwaukee, Wisconsin. He graduated from North Division High School in Milwaukee, and went to the University of Wisconsin in Madison in 1917, but quit in his freshman year to join the U.S. Army at the outbreak of World War I. Due to an appendectomy, he was unable to join the American Expeditionary Force; when the Armistice with Germany came he was in artillery training at Fort Monroe. Reed returned to Wisconsin to complete his degree in electrical engineering.

== Career ==
=== GE ===
Philip Reed joined General Electric in 1926 as a member of its law department. He became general counsel to the Incandescent Lamp Department in 1934, and in 1937, he was appointed assistant to the president of GE. In 1940, he was named chairman of GE's board of directors, which he left in 1942 to serve the U.S. government. He resumed his GE office in 1945 and retired in 1958 after 32 years of service.

=== Public service ===
After the outbreak of World War II in 1942 he went to work for the War Production Board as chief of the Bureau of Industries. Later he went to London as deputy to W. Averell Harriman, who headed a lend lease mission to England. In 1943 he became head of the U.S. Mission for Economic Affairs, with the rank of minister, when Harriman was appointed U.S. Ambassador to the Soviet Union.

== Council on Foreign Relations ==
Reed was a member of the board of directors of the Council on Foreign Relations from 1945 to 1969. The Philip D. Reed Senior Fellowship in Science and Technology at the Council on Foreign Relations was established by a gift from the Philip D. Reed Foundation with additional financial support from the Malcolm Hewitt Wiener Foundation.

Business positions
Preceded by Owen Young	Chairman of General Electric; 1940–1942	Succeeded by Owen Young
Preceded by Owen Young	Chairman of General Electric; 1945–1958	Succeeded by Ralph J. Cordiner
