= Josephine Young Case =

American educator (1907–1990)

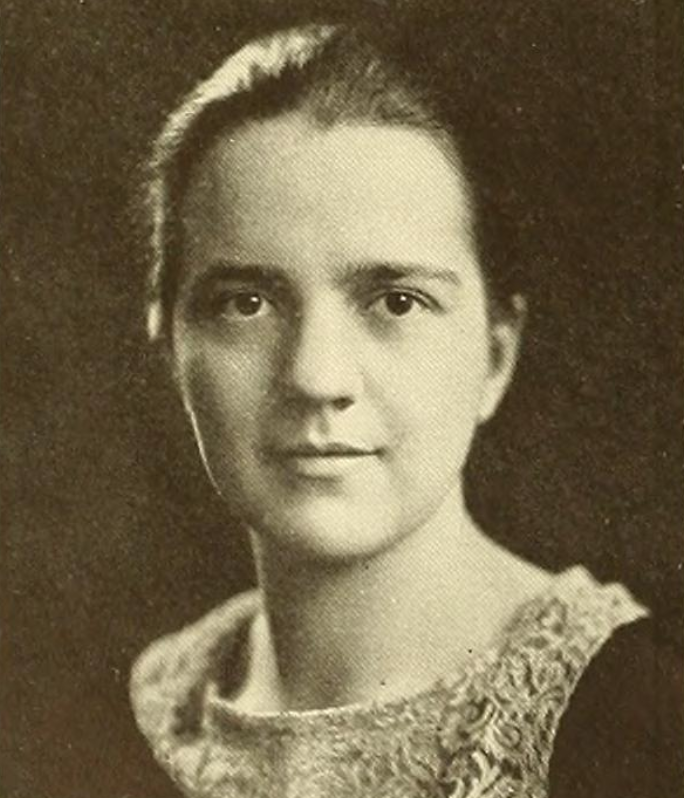
- Born: Josephine Young; February 16, 1907; Lexington, Massachusetts, U.S.
- Died: January 8, 1990 (aged 82); Waterville, New York, U.S.
- Education: Radcliffe College, MA; Bryn Mawr College
- Known for: educator, academic administrator, and writer
- Father: Owen D. Young

Josephine Young Case (February 16, 1907- January 8, 1990) was an educator, academic administrator, and writer.

== Early life ==
Josephine Young was born on February 16, 1907, in Lexington, Massachusetts, to Owen D. and Josephine Edmonds Young. Owen Young was the chairman of the General Electric Company and founded the Radio Corporation of America.

Young attended Brearley School and then Bryn Mawr College (1928). She earned her master's degree in American literature at Radcliffe College (1931). She published her first book, "A Midnight on the 31st of March" in 1938. The book was republished in 1990, and inspired Under the Dome (novel).

== Career ==
While her husband was president of Colgate University, Case taught a literature course there. During this time, she continued to publish literature.

In 1961, Case became the first female director of the RCA. She remained in that position until 1972. Other board memberships included Bryn Mawr, the Colgate University Board of Trustees, the Fund for the Advancement of Education, NBC, National Merit Scholarship Corporation, the Girl Scouts, and the Saratoga Performing Arts Center.

Case joined the board of trustees of Skidmore College in 1938 and was its chair from 1960 to 1971. During her tenure as chair, the campus of Skidmore was redesigned. In 1964, when President Val Wilson suddenly died, Case served as the college's interim president for fifteen months. In 1974, the Case College Center was named in her honor.

== Personal life ==
Case married Everett Needham Case and had four children. She died on January 8, 1990, in Waterville, New York.

== Works ==
- Case, Josephine Young (1938). At Midnight on the 31st of March. Houghton.
- Case, Josephine Young (1945). Written in Sand. Houghton.
- Case, Josephine Young (1946). Freedom's Farm. Houghton.
- Case, Josephine Young (1969). This Very Tree. Houghton.
- Case, Josephine Young; Case, Everett Needham (1982). Owen D. Young and American Enterprise: A Biography. Boston, M.A.: D.R. Godine.
- Case, Josephine Young (1992). New and Selected Poems of Josephine Young Case. Lititz, PA: Sutter House.

== Awards ==
- 1946: Litt.D., Elmira College
- 1957: Litt.D., Skidmore College
- 1959: Litt.D., St. Lawrence University
- 1962: L.H.D., Colgate University
- 1981: The Frances Riker Davis 1915 Award
- Bryn Mawr Alumnae Award
