= Sharif Abdullah =

American attorney, academic, and writer (born 1951)

- Born: Sherwood James Sanders; March 24, 1951 (age 75); Philadelphia, Pennsylvania, U.S.
- Education: Clark University (BA); Boston University School of Law (JD)
- Occupations: Attorney; academic; writer

Shariff Abdullah (born Sherwood James Sanders; March 24, 1951) is an American attorney, academic, and writer.

He works in the field of social, cultural and spiritual transformation. He is a proponent of an inclusive global human society. Sharif Abdullah teaches groups and individuals how to understand and practice inclusivity – the connection with all beings.

Abdullah's writings include The Power of One: Authentic Leadership in Turbulent Times and Creating a World That Works for All. He is the founder and president of Commonway Institute, the originator of the Commons Café and the Common Society Movement.

== Early years ==
Abdullah was born Sherwood James Sanders on March 24, 1951, in Philadelphia, Pennsylvania, and reared in Camden, New Jersey.

Abdullah received a BA in psychology from Clark University and earned a Juris Doctor degree from Boston University School of Law.

Abdullah passed the bar exam in North Carolina in 1977 and began practicing law with Legal Services of the Southern Piedmont (based in Charlotte, North Carolina).

== Work with Sarvodaya in Sri Lanka ==
Since 1996, Abdullah has worked with Sarvodaya Shramadana Sangamaya (Sarvodaya). He currently volunteers as a senior advisor to Sarvodaya.

== Academic positions ==
- Adjunct faculty member at Marylhurst University.
- Lecturer at the UC Berkeley.
- Adjunct professor at Portland State University in the Philosophy/Conflict Resolution department.

== Bibliography ==
- Abdullah, Shariff (1995). The Power of One: Authentic Leadership in Turbulent Times. Philadelphia: New Society Publishers. ISBN 0-9632184-0-9. OCLC 32392522.
- Abdullah, Sharif (1999). Creating a World That Works for All. San Francisco: Berrett-Kohler Publishers. ISBN 1-57675-062-0. OCLC 4572931. Winner of the 1999 "Book of the Year" award from the Independent Book Publishers Association (Current Affairs).
- Abdullah, Shariff. "The Soul of a Terrorist: Reflections on Our War with "The Other", Chapter Seven in The Psychology of Terrorism (Volume I of four volumes). Greenwood Press, 2002 ISBN 0-275-97771-4 WorldCat
- Abdullah, Shariff and Beegle, Donna. "The Class Continuum" Communication Across Barriers, 2006.
