= Oscar Ferdinand Telgmann =

German-Canadian composer

Oscar Ferdinand Telgmann (ca. 1855 – 30 March 1946) was a German-Canadian composer of operettas, conductor and educator, and violinist best known for his operetta Leo, the Royal Cadet.

== Early life ==
Telgmann was born in Mengeringhausen (now part of Bad Arolsen), Principality of Waldeck and Pyrmont to Jean Ferdinand Telgmann and Dorette Margaret Leonhardti. In 1863, at age 6 emigrated with his parents to Kingston, Ontario via New York. He began his musical studies in Canada.

== Career ==
In 1882, with his siblings, Telgmann formed the Telgmann Concert Party, a touring ensemble. He founded, in 1892, the Kingston Conservatory of Music and School of Elocution of which he was principal for over 25 years. He led the school's student orchestra. In 1914, he founded the Kingston Symphony Orchestra, which he conducted until his retirement in 1936.

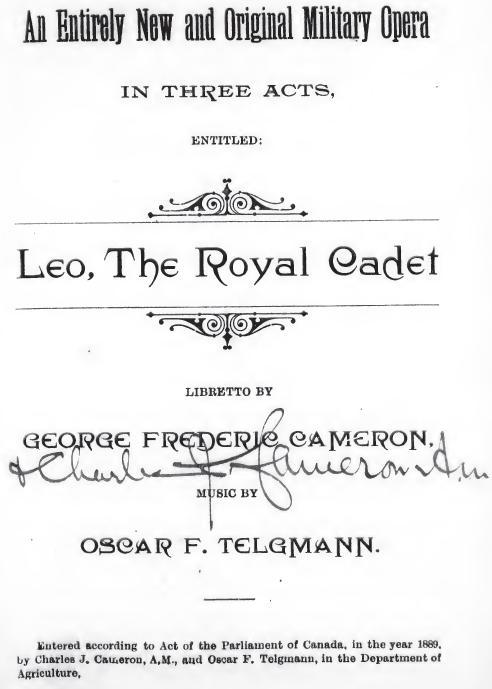
Leo, the Royal Cadet, opera by Telgmann based on Royal Military College of Canada

Telgmann composed three operettas, The Miller and the Maid, King of Siam and Leo, the Royal Cadet. The last achieved over 1,700 performances between its premiere in 1889 and 1925 and has recently been revived in a revised version. Other compositions included marches such as "Boo Hoo's Queen's Dominion Victory March" (1922) and "The Mascot: Boo Hoo's March to Queen's Rugby Team". He composed songs such as "The Nutcracker Mazurka", "Mr. Craig", "The Laird of Glenburne", and "Scotch Country Dance".

== Personal life ==
Telgmann married Alida Jackson. Their daughter Mignon Telgmann (born 1898) was a violin teacher.

Telgmann died in Toronto in 1946 at the age of approximately 91. A music bursary established by his family in his memory and that of his daughter Mignon (born 1898) was subsequently established at Queen's University.

== Works ==
- Mascot music for Boo Hoo the Bear, "Boo Hoo's Queen's Dominion Victory March" (1922) and "The Mascot: Boo Hoo's March to Queen's Rugby Team"
- Leo, the Royal Cadet, "Ho! Ho! My Airy Fairy Maid", "Ho! Ho! My Pretty Maid", "I met him in the far away" from Opera and Operetta Excerpts; composer: Oscar Telgmann, words: George Frederick Cameron
- "Farewell, O Fragrant Pumpkin Pie" from Leo, the Royal Cadet; composer: Oscar Telgmann, words: George Frederick Cameron
- Klondyke march and two step [microform] / [music by] Oscar Ferdinand Telgmann Kingston: Music Emporium, c. 1897
- The British Whig march [for piano] / by Oscar Ferdinand Telgmann Kingston, Ont. c. 1900
- Our Premier [music] / words by George Frederick Cameron; music by Oscar Ferdinand Telgmann, Kingston, Ontario: C.J. Cameron, c. 1885 in honour of John A. Macdonald
- Scotch Country Dance for piano and violin music by Oscar Ferdinand Telgmann, Kingston, Ontario
- The Usual way for medium voice and piano by Oscar Ferdinand Telgmann, Kingston, Ontario

== See also ==
- List of Canadian composers
- Music of Canada
