= Leo, the Royal Cadet =

- An entirely new and original military opera
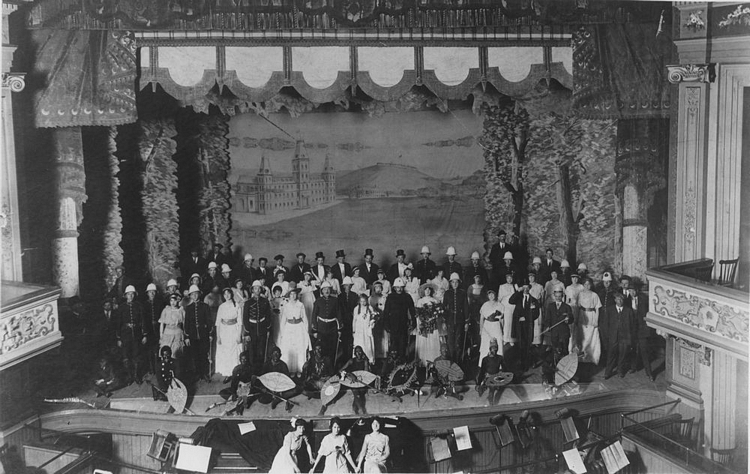
- Leo the Royal Cadet, The Grand Theatre, Kingston, Ontario Jun 3-5 1915
- Music: Oscar Ferdinand Telgmann
- Lyrics: George Frederick Cameron
- Productions: 1,700 performances from 1889-1925. 1982, 1990, 2010

Leo, the Royal Cadet is a light opera with music by Oscar Ferdinand Telgmann. The libretto was by George Frederick Cameron. It was composed in Kingston, Ontario, Canada in 1889. The work centres on Nellie's love for Leo, a cadet at the Royal Military College of Canada who becomes a hero serving during the Anglo-Zulu War in 1879 between the British Empire and the Zulu Empire. The operetta focussed on typical character types, events and concerns of Telgmann and Cameron's time and place.

== Background ==
The story is loosely based on actual events. The character 'Colonel Hewett' is based on Colonel Edward Osborne Hewett, C.M.G. who served as the first Commandant of the Royal Military College of Canada 1875-86. The character of Leo, who leaves his sweetheart Nellie to fight the Zulus in Natal, and other cadets may be based on several early cadets who were decorated for valour. Huntley Brodie Mackay, a Royal Engineer was the first ex-cadet to win a Distinguished Service Order, served in Bechuanaland 1884-9 and as commanding royal engineer in West Africa 1887-9. Mackay fought tribes near Sierra Leone and became an acting administrator of the British East Africa Company. William Henry Robinson, Royal Engineer, the first ex-cadet to be killed in action, died while attempting to blow up the gate of a stockade at Tambi near Sierra Leone. Kenneth J.R. Campbell was the first ex-cadet to be mentioned in despatches for his part in the operation against the town of Brohemie, Niger Coast Protectorate. Sir George Norton Cory participated in operations in Natal, South Africa in 1899 and later edited 'The Diary of Reverend Francis Owen M. A., missionary with Dingaan in 1837-38 together with extracts from the writings of the interpreters in Zulu, Messrs. Hulley and Kirkman'(Cape Town, South Africa: Van Riebeech Society, 1926).

The character Cetcho, a Zulu chief is based on Cetshwayo. The Battalion Sergeant Major character who sings The Royal Cadet - The Battalion Sergeant Major was the senior cadet at the Royal Military College of Canada from 1878–1923 and 1934-42. Since 1952, the senior cadet has been known as a Cadet Wing-Commander.

== Performance history ==
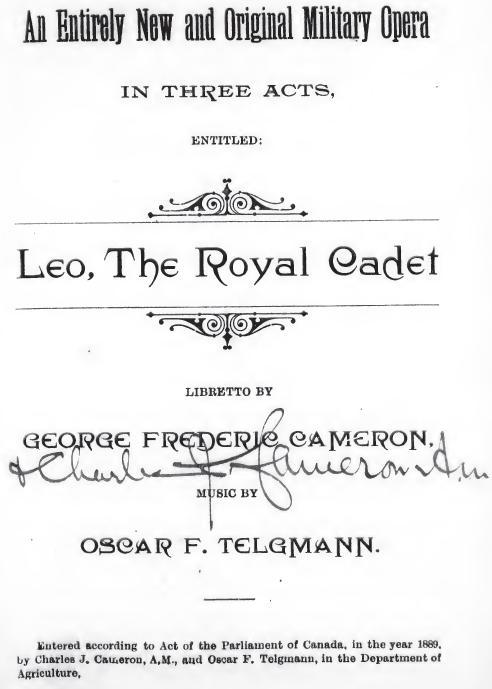
Leo, the Royal Cadet Opera based on Royal Military College of Canada

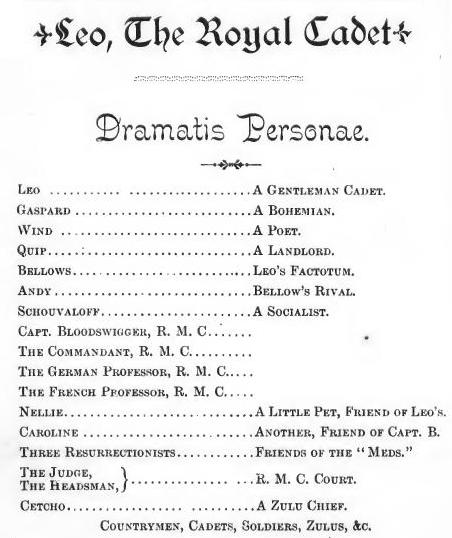
Dramatis Personae, Leo, the Royal Cadet Opera based on Royal Military College of Canada

Musical dramas such as Leo, the Royal Cadet were important entertainment in the 19th century. The work premiered "under the Patronage of the Commandant and Staff, and Gentleman Cadets of the Royal Military College" on 11 July 1889 at Martin's Opera House in Kingston. The opera went on to tour, in Canada and the United States. It played successfully in Kingston, Ottawa, Guelph, Toronto, Woodstock, Ontario and Utica, New York. There were 1,700 performances in the closing years of the 19th Century and as late as 1925. The play was not performed for 75 years. The Toronto Operetta Theatre hired Canadian composer John Greer to revise and orchestrate the piano score and Virginia Reh to revise the libretto. In 1982 excerpts from Leo, the Royal Cadet were performed at Music at Sharon (a summer concert series in Ontario) and in 1990 excerpts were performed in Toronto and Ottawa. Seven excerpts from the work were reprinted in Canadian Musical Heritage Society (CMH), vol 10.

In recent years, the musical play has been performed in Canada, for example by the Toronto Operetta Theatre. For revivals, the opera was shortened from three acts into two and 8 of the 17 characters were eliminated.

Commandant Commodore William S. Truelove (Royal Roads Military College 1985), as Honorary Patron for Toronto Operetta Theatre's Leo, The Royal Cadet, attended on Opening Night with a contingent of cadets and alumni on February 19, 2010.

The synopsis of this version is given below.

== Roles ==
| Role | Voice type | Premiere Cast, 11 July 1889 (Conductor:) |
|---|---|---|
| Leo, a gentleman cadet | tenor | |
| Wind, a poet | tenor | |
| Andy, a dude | baritone | |
| Phillip, a soldier | | |
| Capt. Bloodswigger, R. M. C. | baritone | |
| Colonel Hewett, the Commandant of the Royal Military College of Canada | baritone | |
| The German professor, R. M. C | tenor | |
| The French professor, R. M. C. | tenor | |
| Nellie, Leo's sweetheart | soprano | |
| Caroline, a friend of Capt. Bloodswigger | mezzo-soprano | |
| Madge, a friend of Wind | | |
| The headsman, Ketcho, a Zulu chief | bass-baritone | |

== Synopsis (revised two-act version) ==
The opera is a light-hearted piece about love and war which traces the career of Leo before, during, and after he entered the Royal Military College of Canada in Kingston, Ontario. The opera opens with Leo and his beloved Nellie on picnic grounds outside the Royal Military College. Leo is recruited by Captain Bloodswigger to fight with the Zulus in Natal, Africa. Leo is awarded the Victoria Cross for valour. The opera ends with his reunion with his true love, Nellie, on a village green on the St. Lawrence River.

=== Act 1 ===
The opera opens on the picnic grounds outside the Royal Military College of Canada in Kingston, Queen Victoria’s birthday, May 1878. Leo the Royal Cadet and his sweetheart Nellie are enjoying a picnic party. Captain Wellington Bloodswigger takes the opportunity to recruit officers for the Anglo-Zulu war. Wind, a young poet and composer friend of Leo attends the picnic in pursuit of material for his Faerie Opera. ("I am Wind"). The Ladies led by Nellie, Caroline and Madge, carry their picnic baskets ("We are maidens"). Captain Wellington Bloodswigger introduces the Royal Military College Commandant Hewitt, who introduces the new French and German professors ("The French and German professors") and invites the entire party for a tour of the College. Nellie is concerned by Leo’s plans to join the forces against the Zulus in Africa and regrets she ever listened to his words of love ("Maiden so beautiful/First Love"). The picnic party resumes ("The red sun sinks to sleep") with dances, ("The Rideau") and military hymns ("Glory and Victory"). Leo and Wind decide to serve. The commandant, noting Nellie’s distress decides to woo her for himself ("Ho, ho! My pretty maid"). The commandant decides to rid himself of Leo ("The Initiation") by ordering Captain Bloodswigger to add both Leo and Wind to the next party leaving for the war. The celebrations end with a hymn to pumpkin pie (Farewell O Fragrant Pumpkin Pie) and tender farewells.

=== Act 2 ===
Scene 1

Leo is with a group of soldiers serving at the British Camp at Isandiwana, January 1879 ("Soldiers and our country’s pride"). He thinks of Nellie ("The days of long ago"). Leo cannot sleep and sounds the bugle upon the impending threat of the Zulus ("The moon is bright/To the field'). The Zulus demand a return of their dear native land ("Now for justice") and battle against the invader ("The Battle').

Scene 2

In the spring of 1879, Nellie and her friends are on the grounds outside the Royal Military College. Nellie is concerned that Leo may have been killed in action (He sleeps the sleep). Caroline consoles her (True love can never alter). They remain faithful and are uninterested in romantic opportunities with Andy and his friends (We are the Dudes). The ladies mock these advances in (Some day!). Leo, Captain Wellington Bloodswigger arrive with Wind (Smile again). Wind who puts on a performance of the Wind's Faerie Opera (Wind’s Faerie Opera). All sing (Glory and Victory) as the curtain falls.

== Musical numbers (original three-act version) ==
=== Act 1 ===
Scene 1

An inn in the Village of Dead-and-Alive. As the curtain rises, Gaspard, Bloodswigger, Leo, Quip, el al, are discovered about the table.

- Drinking Song (Gaspard)
- Socialism (Schouvaloff)
- The Bohemian (Gaspard)
- Glory and Victory (Bloodswigger)

Scene 2

The Village Green. Farewell picnic to Leo

- The Red Sun Sinks to Sleep (Villagers)
- The Cross-cut Saw" (Bellows)
- Hie Away - Fly Away (Caroline)
- Farewell O Fragrant Pumpkin Pie (Leo)

=== Act 2 ===
Scene 1

The Gates of R. M. C, Kingston. Commandant and Students enter and face Leo

- Glory and Victory (students)

Scene 2

The R. M. C. Court. The Court of the Bulldogs in full session. White sheets, masks with bulldog faces, headsman and axe, etc. Wind in night shirt, bound etc.

- The Bulldogs (Sheriff and student chorus)
- Judge's Song (Judge)
- The Resurrectionists

=== Act 3 ===
Outside the gates of R.M.C.

Scene 1

The R.M.C

- Ensemble (Nellie and Maidens)
- I Met him in the Far-Away (Nellie)
- Though Thou Could'st Offer (Nellie)
- Maiden So Beautiful (Leo)
- First Love (Nellie and Leo)
- O Maidens Fair (Battalion Sergeant Major (senior cadet) and chorus of Cadets)
- The Royal Cadet (Battalion Sergeant Major (senior cadet))
- I am Wind (Wind)
- Farewell (Leo, Nellie, Bloodswigger, Caroline)

Scene 2

Three months later, Isamdula. The British tents by moonlight in the distance.

- The Days of Long Ago (Leo)
- The Moon is Bright (Leo)
- The Flag of Fatherland (Soldiers)

Scene 3

Zululand, near Isamdula. Night. Enter Cetcho and Zulu warriors.

- The Stars As They Look (Cetcho)

Scene 4

The village green in Dead and Alive. Nellie discovered sitting on a mound.

- He Sleeps the Sleep (Nellie)
- True Love Can Never Alter (Caroline, Nellie and Maidens)
- Glory and Victory! (All)

== Recordings ==
- 'Leo, The Royal Cadet: Recitative: Duet' Vocal Recital: Dibblee, Sally / Braun, Russell - (Le Souvenir - Canadian Songs for Parlour and Stage)

== See also ==
- List of Canadian composers
- Music of Canada
