= Greg Boester =

American ski jumper (1968–2023)

Personal information
- Full name: Gregory Jon Boester
- Born: November 27, 1968 Los Angeles, California, U.S.
- Died: December 29, 2023 (aged 55) Rye, New York, U.S.

Sport
- Sport: Skiing

Gregory Jon Boester (November 27, 1968 – December 29, 2023) was an American ski jumper who competed in the 1994 Winter Olympics, and was a banker at JPMorgan Chase.

In July 2013, Boester became the president of the U.S. Ski and Snowboard Team Foundation, a non-profit that raises funds for the U.S. Ski and Snowboard Association. In 1996, Boester joined the association's board of directors; in 2004, he joined the foundation's board of trustees.

Boester held an economics degree from St. Lawrence University and an MBA from the Wharton School at the University of Pennsylvania. He died on December 29, 2023, at the age of 55.
