= James Marshall Reilly =

- Born: September 21, 1981 (age 44); New York City
- Education: St. Lawrence University
- Occupations: Talent agent, author, entrepreneur, public speaker
- Website: http://www.jamesmarshallreilly.com

James Marshall Reilly (born September 21, 1981, in New York City) is an American talent agent, entrepreneur, author, and public speaker.

His business book Shake the World: It's Not About Finding a Job, It's About Creating a Life was published by Portfolio, a Penguin Random House imprint in December 2011. His second book, One Great Speech: Secrets, Stories, and Perks of the Paid Speaking Industry (And How You Can Break In), was published by Sourcebooks in October 2020.

Reilly was formerly a professional musician.

== Shake the World ==
Shake the World: It's Not About Finding a Job, It's About Creating a Life was released in the United States by Portfolio on December 29, 2011, to mostly favorable reviews.

The Financial Times called the book "A call to arms to the breathless young." Publishers Weekly wrote, "Reilly's tone is pleasantly idealistic and his lively style will engage young readers with its hopeful message that there are innovative alternatives to a traditional corporate career path." The Los Angeles Times stated, "For anyone looking for a present for an anxious 21-year-old, Reilly's book Shake the World: It's Not About Finding a Job, It's about Creating a Life is it. Just don't be surprised if they then ditch their plans to take a job in accounting, head off to dig irrigation ditches in Haiti, tweet the results and apply for the next round of TED fellowships."

A favorable review also appeared in the New York Daily News.

Shake the World received a mixed review from Kirkus Reviews, which stated that Reilly was "uncritical of those subjects and sometimes seems starry-eyed as he chronicles their generosities."

== One Great Speech ==
One Great Speech: Secrets, Stories, and Perks of the Paid Speaking Industry (And How You Can Break In) was released in the United States by Sourcebooks on October 6, 2020.

== Personal ==
Reilly lives in New York City's West Village.
