= George Frederick Cameron =

Canadian poet, lawyer, and journalist

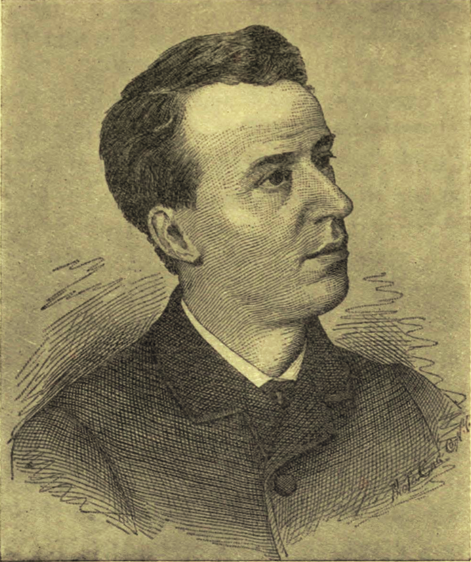
- Born: 24 September 1854; New Glasgow, Nova Scotia
- Died: 17 September 1885 (aged 30); Millhaven, Ontario
- Occupations: Poet, lawyer, journalist

George Frederick Cameron (24 September 1854 – 17 September 1885) was a Canadian poet, lawyer, and journalist, best known for the libretto for the operetta Leo, the Royal Cadet.

== Life ==
He was born in New Glasgow, Nova Scotia, the son of James Grant Cameron and Jessie Sutherland. He was educated in New Glasgow.

He moved to Boston in April 1869. For three years he was writing on the subject of freedom, especially the struggle which was taking place in Cuba. He graduated from the Boston University School of Law in 1877. He worked for the law firm Dean, Butler and Abbot of Boston from 1877 to 1882. He contributed poetry to Boston periodicals, including the Courier and the Transcript. In the fall of 1882, he enrolled in Queen's College in Kingston, Ontario, where he won a poetry prize in 1883 for "Adelphi". He is sometimes considered one of the Confederation Poets.

He married a 12-year Ella Amey on 22 August 1883. He was the editor of the Daily News in Kingston, Ontario, from March 1883 until his death of heart failure on 17 September 1885 at Millhaven, Ontario. The couple had had one daughter, Jessie Cameron Alison.

George Frederick Cameron was a war poet since he was a poet writing in time of and on the subject of the Anglo-Zulu War. He wrote Leo, the Royal Cadet. The latter achieved over 1,700 performances between its premiere in 1889 and 1925 and has recently been revived in 2001 and 2010. In 1887, his brother, Charles L. Cameron, edited and published a selection of Cameron's poems under the title Lyrics on Freedom, Love and Death (Kingston, 1887).

== Recognition ==
Cameron's poem "On Leaving the Coast of Nova Scotia" was included in the 1889 anthology Songs of the Great Dominion. His poetry also appeared in A Century of Canadian Sonnets (1910).

Cameron was declared a Person of National Historic Significance in 1946. A bronze plaque was affixed to the New Glasgow post office (since moved to the town's Dominion Building) by Historic Sites and Monuments of Canada which reads: "George Frederick Cameron, Poet and Journalist, Author of Lyrics of Freedom, Love and Death. Born at New Glasgow, 24 September 1854. Died in Kingston, Ontario, 17 September 1885."

== Works ==
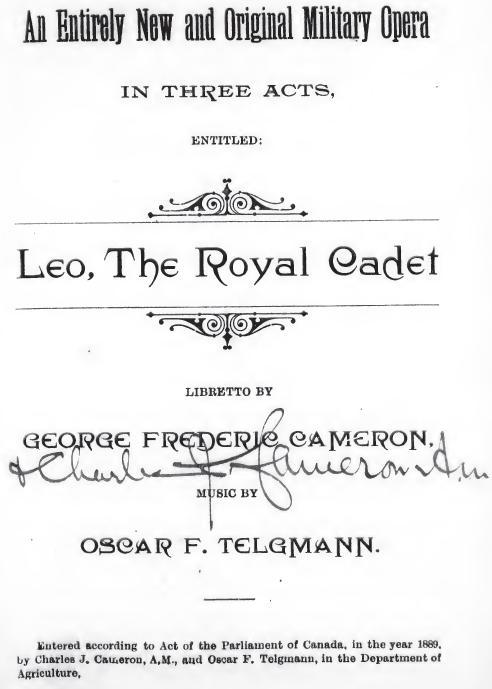
Leo, the Royal Cadet, opera by Oscar Ferdinand Telgmann and George Frederick Cameron based on Royal Military College of Canada

- Leo, the Royal Cadet, George Frederick Cameron (libretto) and Oscar Ferdinand Telgmann, 'An entirely new and original military opera in four acts' (Kingston, 1889)
- "Ho! Ho! My Airy Fairy Maid", "Ho! Ho! My Pretty Maid", "I met him in the far away" from Opera and Operetta Excerpts, composer: Oscar Ferdinand Telgmann
- "Words: George Frederick Cameron "Farewell, O Fragrant Pumpkin Pie" from Leo, the Royal Cadet, composer: Oscar Ferdinand Telgmann
- "Our Premier music/words by George Frederick Cameron; music by Oscar Telgmann", Kingston, Ontario: C. J. Cameron, c. 1885 in honour of John A. Macdonald
- Cameron, George Frederick (1887). Cameron, C. J. (ed.). Lyrics on Freedom, Love and Death. Kingston, Ontario: Queen's University. Archived from the original on 7 September 2012. – Lyrics on Freedom, Love and Death at Google Books – Lyrics on Freedom, Love and Death at Google Books
- Cameron, George Frederick (1895). "The Golden Text". In Stedman, Edmund Clarence (ed.). A Victorian Anthology, 1837–1895. Cambridge, UK: Riverside Press.
- Cameron, George Frederick (1895). "Standing on Tiptoe". In Stedman, Edmund Clarence (ed.). A Victorian Anthology, 1837–1895. Cambridge, UK: Riverside Press.
- Cameron, George Frederick (1895). "What Matters". In Stedman, Edmund Clarence (ed.). A Victorian Anthology, 1837–1895. Cambridge, UK: Riverside Press.
- Garvin, John William, ed. (1916). "George Frederick Cameron (1854–1885)". Canadian Poets and Poetry. Toronto: McClelland, Goodchild & Stewart. pp. 101–108. – Canadian Poets and Poetry at Google Books
- Cameron, George Frederick (4 March 2013). "First Love". Canada Poetry Archive. Library and Archives Canada.
- Cameron, George Frederick (4 March 2013). "My Fate". Canada Poetry Archive. Library and Archives Canada.
- Cameron, George Frederick (4 March 2013). "Remember Thee!". Canada Poetry Archive. Library and Archives Canada.
- Cameron, George Frederick (1910). "June". In Burpee, Lawrence Johnstone (ed.). A Century of Canadian Sonnets. Toronto: Musson. p. 14.
- Cameron, George Frederick (1910). "Wisdom". In Burpee, Lawrence Johnstone (ed.). A Century of Canadian Sonnets. Toronto: Musson. p. 31.
- Cameron, George Frederick (1910). "Anticipation". In Burpee, Lawrence Johnstone (ed.). A Century of Canadian Sonnets. Toronto: Musson. p. 32.
- Cameron, George Frederick (1960). Smith, A. J. M. (ed.). The Future, p. 60, The Oxford Book of Canadian Verse

=== Fonds ===
The George F. Cameron fonds at the University of British Columbia consists of manuscript notebooks as well as handwritten and typewritten copies of his poetry.
