= List of books written by CEOs =

A list of notable books written by CEOs, about CEOs and business.

== Books ==
Title	Author	Company	Year
Untitled autobiography of Andrew Carnegie	Andrew Carnegie	Carnegie Steel	1920
My Life and Work	Henry Ford	Ford Motor Company	1922
Pizza Tiger	Monaghan, Tom	Domino's Pizza	1986
Dave's Way	Thomas, Dave	Wendy's	1992
Bloomberg by Bloomberg	Michael Bloomberg	Bloomberg	1997
The Ride of a Lifetime: Lessons Learned from 15 Years as CEO of the Walt Disney Company	Robert Iger	The Walt Disney Company	2019
The Education of a Value Investor	Spier, Guy	Aquamarine Fund	2014
Invent & Wander	Bezos, Jeff	Amazon	2021
Winning	Welch, Jack	General Electric	2005
Rework	Jason Fried	Basecamp	2010
The Martha Rules: 10 Essentials for Achieving Success as You Start, Grow, or Manage a Business	Stewart, Martha		2005
Execution: The Discipline of Getting Things Done	Bossidy, Larry	General Electric, Honeywell	2002
Eat Mor Chikin: Inspire More People	S Truett Cathy	Chick-fil-A	2002
My Life & Principles for Success	Ross Perot	Electronic Data Systems	2002 (2nd ed)
Time to Make the Donuts	Rosenberg, William	Dunkin Donuts	2001
Straight from the Gut	Welch, Jack	General Electric	2001
Business @ the Speed of Thought	Gates, Bill	Microsoft	1999
Direct from Dell: Strategies that Revolutionized an Industry	Dell, Michael	Dell	2000
Father, Son & Co.: My Life at IBM and Beyond	Watson, Jr., Thomas J.	IBM	2000 (reprint)
Pour Your Heart into It : How Starbucks Built a Company One Cup at a Time	Schultz, Howard	Starbucks	1999
Work in Progress	Eisner, Michael	The Walt Disney Company	1999
An Enterprising Life	Jay van Andel	Amway	1998
Sam Walton: Made in America	Walton, Sam	Walmart	1993
No Excuses Management	Rodgers, TJ		1993
Soros on Soros: Staying Ahead of the Curve	George Soros	Soros Fund Management	1995
Only The Paranoid Survive	Grove, Andrew	Intel	1996
The HP Way : How Bill Hewlett and I Built Our Company	Packard, David	Hewlett-Packard	1996
Personal History	Katharine Graham	Washington Post	1998
My Years with General Motors	Sloan, Alfred	General Motors	1990 (reprint)
Life as I Have Known It Has Been Finger Lickin' Good	Harland Sanders	Kentucky Fried Chicken	1974
Iacocca: An Autobiography	Iacocca, Lee		1984
Grinding It Out: The Making of McDonald's	Kroc, Ray	McDonald's	1976 (reprint 1990)
J.R.D Tata: Beyond the Last Blue Mountain	R. M. Lala	Tata Group	1992
The Science of Success: How Market-Based Management Built the World's Largest Private Company	Charles Koch	Koch Industries	2007
Call Me Ted	Ted Turner	CNN	2008
Behind the Cloud	Marc Benioff	salesforce.com	2009
Delivering Happiness: A Path to Profits, Passion, and Purpose	Tony Hsieh	Zappos	2010
The Start-up of You	Reid Hoffman	LinkedIn	2012
Confessions of an Advertising Man	David Ogilvy	Ogilvy & Mather	1963
Simply Rich	Rich de Vos	Amway	2014
How Google Works	Eric Schmidt	Google	2014
Shoe Dog	Phil Knight	Nike	2016
Papa: The Story of Papa John's Pizza	John Schnatter	Papa John's Pizza	2017
Hit Refresh	Satya Nadella	Microsoft	2017
Winners Dream	Bill McDermott	SAP	2014
Onward	Howard Schultz	Starbucks	2011
Sustaining a 360° Agile Workplace: A Millennial Perspective The HR Revolution Way	Mahmoud Mansi	HR Revolution Middle East	2019
