= Jeffrey A. Krames =

American author

Jeffrey Krames is an American author whose books have been translated into more than 36 languages. Before 2020, Krames established his own "publishing and literary agency", JK Literary Services. Krames is the former editor-in-chief of Portfolio, the business book imprint of The Penguin Group and the former Vice President and head of the trade division of McGraw-Hill.

== Early life and education ==
Krames was born on September 5, 1964, and raised in New York City. He attended the Bronx High School of Science before going on to college in upstate New York at age 16. He graduated magna cum laude from State University of New York at Albany. He is a direct descendant of German and Polish Holocaust survivors.

== Career ==
He joined publisher Prentice-Hall as a sales representative in the midwest region. After being promoted to marketing manager in 1984, Krames relocated to the New York area before being promoted to acquisitions editor in 1985. In that position he spearheaded the absorption of the Reston business book line into the Prentice-Hall publishing program. After two additional promotions, Krames left Prentice-Hall, which had now been acquired by Simon & Schuster to join publisher Dow Jones-Irwin in 1988, which at the time was still owned by Dow Jones & Co. In 1996 the McGraw-Hill Companies acquired all of Richard D. Irwin, which included the trade business book imprint Irwin Professional Publishing (the company had been sold to Times Mirror and had changed its name). At McGraw-Hill Mr. Krames served in a variety of positions, including Publisher of Investing & Finance before being promoted to Publisher of the Business Book division of the Professional Book Group. In 2006 he left McGraw-Hill to join the Penguin Group as Editorial Director of its Portfolio book imprint, where he continues to this day.

== Editing ==
As former Vice President and Publisher of McGraw-Hill's trade business books division, Jeffrey Krames has personally edited and published more than 1,000 business books, including many award-winning, best-selling titles on business luminaries that include Jack Welch, Michael Ovitz, Ross Perot, William Paley, Michael Dell, Bill Gates, Herb Kelleher, and Lou Gerstner among others. Recently, Krames published seven of the top 35 best business books of the year as determined by Library Journal.

== Writing ==
Krames has written nine books with three of them focusing on former General Electric CEO, Jack Welch. Krames writes extensively on leadership and CEOs, and has written an account of Secretary of Defense Donald Rumsfeld's leadership style entitled, The Rumsfeld Way: The Leadership Wisdom of a Battle-Hardened Maverick. Of his latest book, Jack Welch and the 4E's of Leadership, publishing magazine Kirkus said it was "destined to become a leadership classic." His latest book is Inside Drucker's Brain, published by Portfolio in October 2008. Aside from his book publications, he also has written for a variety of newspapers including The Wall Street Journal, The New York Times, The Los Angeles Times, The Chicago Tribune, and has been quoted in Time Magazine, Newsweek, The New York Times, The Chicago Tribune, Publishers Weekly, etc.

=== List of works ===
- The Rumsfeld Way: Leadership Ways of a Battle-Hardened Maverick (2002), example identifiers OCLC 50824232ISBN 9780071415910
- "Clinton will like book's sales, but not the reactions" (2004) "Guest/Opinion" in Great Falls Tribune
- "Why Clinton's 900-page memoir will triumph" (2004), "Commentary" in Chicago Tribune
- What the best CEOs know : 7 exceptional leaders and their lessons for transforming any business (2009), example identifiers OCLC 69756089 ISBN 9780071462525
- Lead With Humility: 12 Leadership Lessons from Pope Francis (2015), example identifiers OCLC 879468834ISBN 9780814449110
