= Super-chicken model =

Team recruitment strategy

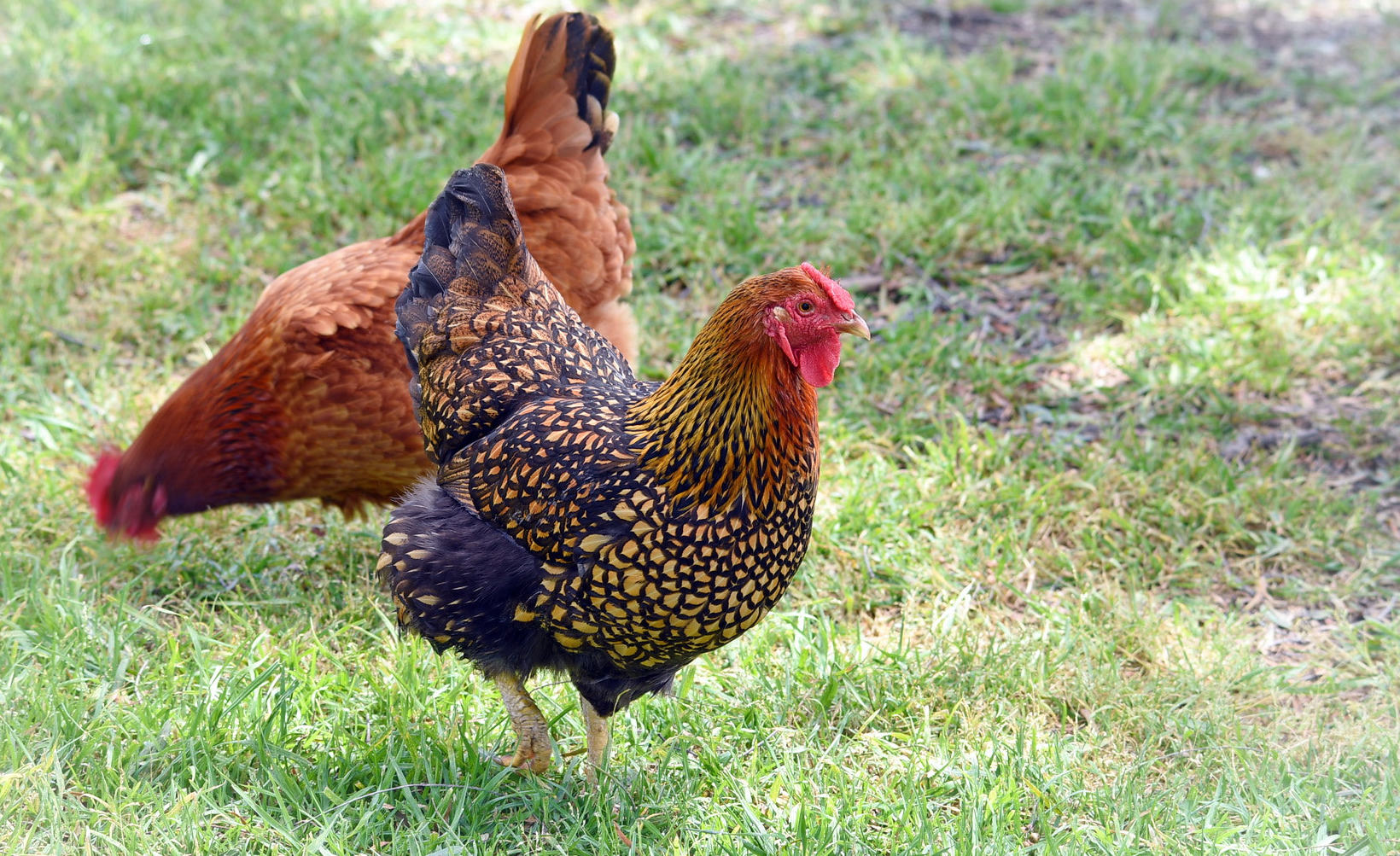

The super-chicken model refers to a manner of team recruitment that favors bringing together highly driven overachievers. It is argued that this can be counterproductive because of the negative effects of hyper-competitiveness on a group's dynamic, and that recruitment that emphasizes collaboration over individual excellence can result in greater productivity. The name makes analogy to the interactions among chickens observed in a study by Purdue University evolutionary biologist William Muir.

== William Muir's research ==
Purdue University biologist William Muir conducted an experiment using chickens. Muir segregated chickens based upon their egg production. He grouped average egg laying chickens together. And he grouped together a prolific egg laying flock: he called these "super chickens". Muir kept these chickens in their groups for two generations and he found that the average chickens were doing fine and they consistently produced eggs. In the super chickens group, Muir found that only three survived as the group had pecked each other to death.

== The super chicken in business and sports ==
In business applications, employees work to become a "Super-chicken", and at times they keep their colleagues down so that they stay on top. According to Stanford University researcher Carol Dweck, people do not all have the same views on success. Some people try to prove they are smart, and others believe that they just need to work harder. Dweck claims talent should not be praised. She claims organizations which are thriving do not label employees: Dweck's research has shown that this method fosters collaboration and cooperation among employees. The concept is that in business everybody has value on the team. Employees need social support, and they need to go to each other for help. The model suggests that choosing the "supermen or superwomen" can create harmful competition which does not benefit the organization.

Margaret Heffernan gave a Ted Talk in 2015: she tied the Muir super-chicken research to employee behavior in a business setting. Heffernan said when employees collaborate rather than compete they create "social capital." Teams working together for the good of the business develop trust in each other. She claimed that one company that synchronized coffee breaks to allow employees to talk to one another and the companies profits increased, while employee satisfaction went up 10 percent.

The Super-chicken mode of operation has produced adverse results in both sports franchises (comparing Real Madrid and Barcelona soccer teams) (Note: "Research on salary allocation shows one mechanism why this can occur, finding that pay inequality is linked to detrimental issues within teams, such that teams with highly unequal salary structures tend to also elicit more negative affect for their members, which can then lead to greater within-group problems.10 Furthermore, the Nobel Prize-winning economist James Buchanan – concerned with the aforementioned ‘mismatch of incentives’ within hockey teams – concluded that as the number of selfish players increases, so too does the likelihood for the other players to adopt the selfish behaviors.1" [Footnote citations omitted]) and other businesses. Survival of the fittest employee hiring models create adverse performance issues. This is a consequential synergy between individuals and group dynamics. Stack ranking can encourage antisocial behavior, and have deleterious effects upon group outcomes, citing Microsoft, Enron, and Amazon's experience.

== See also ==
- Crab mentality
- Dominance hierarchy
- Pecking order
- Vitality curve
