= Winning (book) =

- Author: Jack Welch and Suzy Welch
- Subject: Business management
- Publisher: HarperCollins
- Publication date: 2005
- Media type: Print
- Pages: 384
- ISBN: 9780060753948
- Dewey Decimal: 658.409
- LC Class: HF5386

Winning is a 2005 book on management and business by Jack Welch, co-authored with his wife Suzy Welch. It was a best-seller, selling over 440,000 copies in the first six months of its release. Welch received an advance for the work of an estimated $4 million, down from the $7.1 million he received for his first book, Jack: Straight from the Gut.

== Praise for the book ==
Fortune Magazine termed it, “Manager of the Century.” The New York Times, said “Now is the time.” Warren Buffett said of the book, “When you talk with Jack about management, his energy and passion fill the room.” Buffet added, "No other management book will ever be needed."
