= Larry Culp =

American business executive

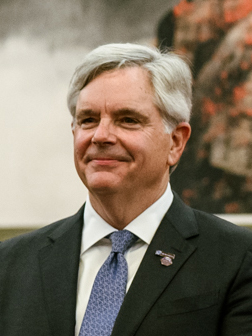
- Culp in 2026
- Born: Henry Lawrence Culp Jr. March 1963 (age 63); Washington, D.C., U.S.
- Education: Washington College (BA); Harvard University (MBA)
- Title: Chairman and CEO of GE Aerospace
- Term: October 2018 – present
- Predecessor: John L. Flannery
- Children: 3

Henry Lawrence "Larry" Culp, Jr. (born March 1963) is an American business executive. He is chairman and CEO of GE Aerospace. He is the first outsider to run GE in the company's 126-year history.

Prior to joining GE, Culp worked at Pall Corporation and Danaher Corporation in Washington, D.C. He joined the Danaher Corporation in 1990 and was CEO from 2001 through 2014. Culp joined the GE board of directors in April 2018.

== Early life and education ==
Culp was born and raised in the Washington, D.C. area, the son of a small welding company owner. He earned a bachelor's degree from Washington College, and an MBA from Harvard Business School.

== Career ==
Culp joined Danaher in 1990 via the subsidiary Veeder-Root, and became President of that company 1993. He was appointed a group executive and corporate officer in 1995, with responsibility for Danaher’s Environmental and Electronic Test and Measurement platforms while also being President of Fluke and Fluke Networks. He was named an Executive Vice President in 1999, Chief Operating Officer in 2001, and President as well as CEO in 2001. Previously, Culp was a senior lecturer at Harvard Business School, where he focused on leadership, strategy and general management in the MBA and executive education programs.

Culp is also a senior advisor at Bain Capital Private Equity and a non-executive director of T. Rowe Price.

Culp's pay package of up to $21 million a year for four years as chairman and CEO of General Electric has attracted attention, especially the element tied to any stock price increase, with about $47 million for a 50% rise and perhaps $300 million for a 150% increase. In 2020, Culp was offered a contract-extension of two years by the board of General Electric that would last until August 2024.

In April 2021, the Financial Times reported that Culp faced push back from two of the largest shareholder advisers on his pay package, which includes a bonus of $47 million. In June 2022, Culp extended his role as CEO of GE Aviation, in addition to GE. Following GE HealthCare's spin-off from GE in January 2023, Culp was appointed as its non-executive chairman. Culp's total compensation for 2024 was $87.4 million.

== Personal life ==
Culp is married, with three children, and lives in the Boston area.

Business positions
| Preceded by John L. Flannery | Chairman and Chief Executive Officer of General Electric; 2018–present | Incumbent |
