= Jeff Immelt =

American businessman (born 1956)

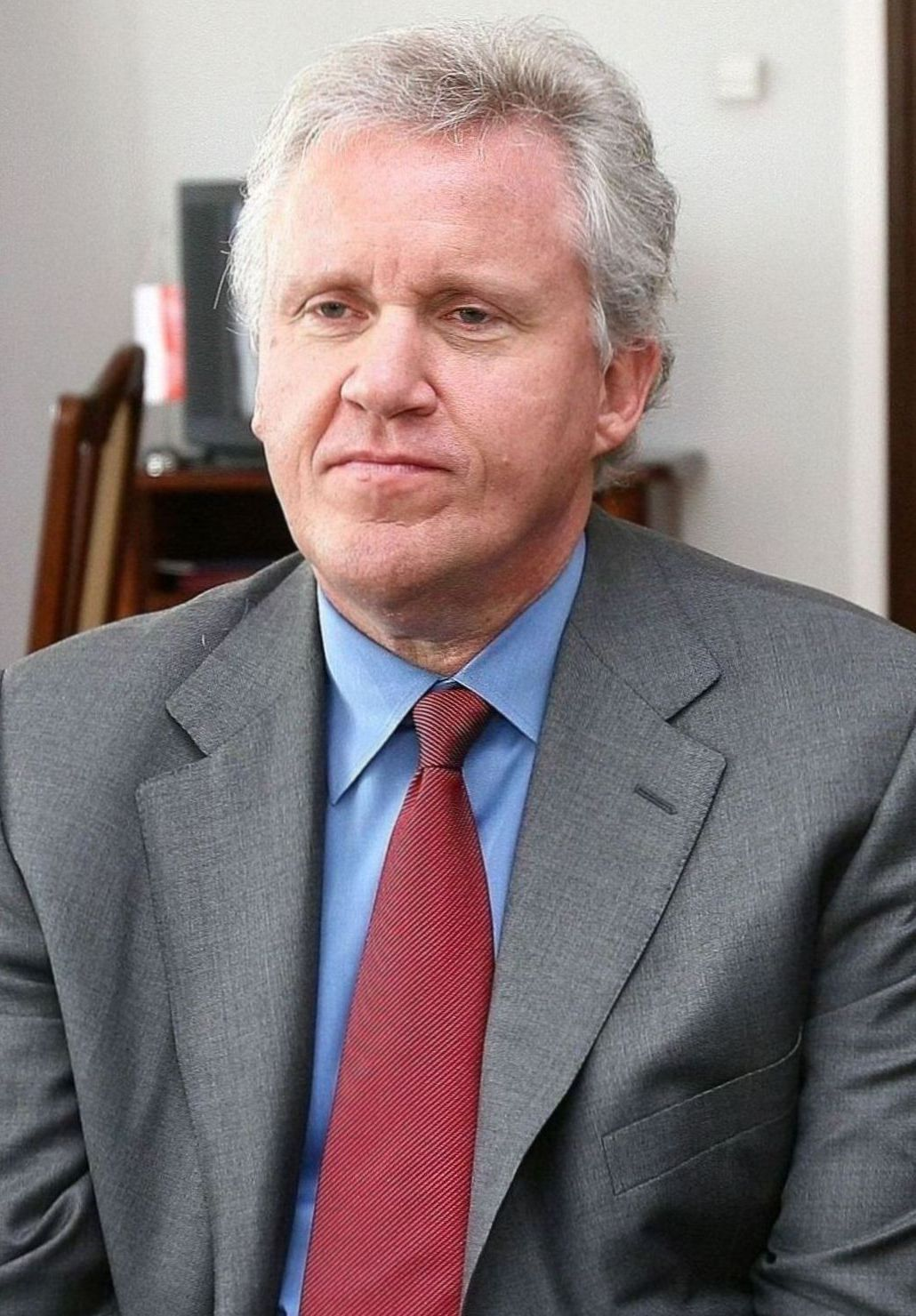
- Immelt in 2009

Chair of the President's Council on Jobs and Competitiveness
- In office 2011–2013
- President: Barack Obama
- Preceded by: Paul Volcker (as Chair of the President's Economic Recovery Advisory Board)
- Succeeded by: Position abolished

Personal details
- Born: Jeffrey Robert Immelt; February 19, 1956 (age 70) Cincinnati, Ohio, U.S.
- Party: Republican
- Spouse: Andrea Immelt
- Children: 1
- Education: Dartmouth College (AB); Harvard University (MBA)
- Occupation: Manufacturing executive

Jeffrey Robert Immelt (born February 19, 1956) is an American manufacturing executive working as a venture partner at New Enterprise Associates. He previously was the CEO of General Electric from 2001 to 2017, and the CEO of GE's Medical Systems division from 1997 to 2000. Immelt's tenure saw GE's largest divestments in the company's history, as the company sold almost two-thirds of its subsidiaries and assets.

== Early life and education ==
Immelt was born on February 19, 1956, in Cincinnati, the son of Donna Rosemary (née Wallace), a school teacher, and Joseph Francis Immelt, who managed the General Electric Aircraft Engines Division.

Immelt attended Finneytown Secondary Campus. There he captained the football and basketball teams. In college he played football and was an offensive tackle. He earned an A.B. in applied mathematics and economics cum laude from Dartmouth College in 1978. He was president of his fraternity, Phi Delta Alpha.

During his years at Dartmouth he worked summers on a Ford assembly line in Cincinnati; after graduating he worked for Procter & Gamble, where he shared a cubicle with Steve Ballmer, who went on to become CEO of Microsoft. He obtained an MBA from Harvard Business School in 1982 and described business school as "one of the most intense times of your life." He was later offered to work for Morgan Stanley, which he declined. Instead, he wanted to work for General Electric like his father.

== General Electric ==
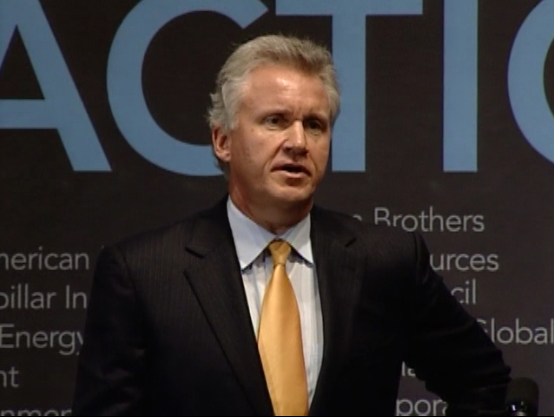
Immelt at the U.S. Climate Action Partnership in January 2007

Immelt joined General Electric in 1982, working in GE's plastics, appliances, and healthcare businesses. He became a GE corporate officer in 1989, joined the GE Capital board in 1997 and took the reins of the corporate leadership of GE Healthcare before assuming his position as CEO in 2001.

=== Tenure as CEO ===
Four days after Immelt became CEO, the September 11 attacks took place which cost GE's insurance division $600 million, killed two employees and directly affected the company's Aircraft Engines sector. After becoming CEO, Immelt offered an expanded set of financial reports in addition to GE's traditional format.

Immelt participated actively in mergers and acquisitions, purchasing Amersham PLC for $9.5 billion in 2004 and Alstom's power business for approximately €12.4 billion in 2015. Immelt sold GE's plastics business for $11.6 billion in 2007, NBC Universal for $8 billion in 2013, and GE's appliances business for $3.3 billion in 2014. In 2015, GE announced it would sell its real estate holdings for $26.5 billion and most of GE Capital's assets.

During Immelt's tenure as CEO, the company's financial performance suffered considerably, as shares of GE dropped 30 percent, while the S&P 500 rose by 134% over the same period of time, which had led to suspicions of his managerial competencies to be called into question when running the day-to-day operations of the corporation. GE restated its earnings in 2005 and agreed to pay the SEC $50 million to settle allegations of accounting fraud in 2009.

GE received aid from the Federal Reserve while not paying federal income taxes became a political issue in the 2016 presidential campaign, although GE did pay taxes in other jurisdictions. At the end of 2012, over $100 billion had been kept offshore to avoid a special federal repatriation tax. In 2015, GE announced a repatriation program for part of its cash balances. In 2016, GE moved its headquarters from Connecticut to Massachusetts, citing Connecticut's tax increases.

Immelt had an empty private jet following his own private jet, in case there were delays with his primary jet.

==== Employment ====
At the end of 2001 when Immelt replaced Jack Welch, GE employed 219,000 worldwide and 125,000 in the US, as reported in its SEC Form 10K for 2001. GE's SEC Form 10K for 2014 states that worldwide employment is 305,000, and US employment is 136,000. These employment levels have varied significantly under Immelt.

General Electric year end employment has varied from 273,000 in 2010 to 305,000 in 2014, a net increase of 37,000. Employment had dropped from 315,000 in 2002 to 307,000 in 2013.

=== Executive compensation and retirement ===
Immelt's executive compensation has fluctuated significantly throughout his managerial career. As CEO of General Electric in 2007, Immelt received a total compensation of $14,209,267. In 2008, he received a total compensation of $5,717,469. In 2009, Immelt received a total compensation of $5,487,155. In 2010, Immelt's compensation nearly tripled to $15.2 million. Immelt had a total five year compensation of $53.82 million through 2011, an income which ranked sixth among executives employed by US-based conglomerates. Some components of his total compensation package over the years have been newsworthy. In some years he was granted stock options at $0, and in other years he was paid no bonus. In 2014 his compensation totalled $18.8 million, a decrease from his 2013 compensation of $25.8 million. That 2013 compensation had risen 20% over his 2012 compensation of $20.6 million.

On June 12, 2017, GE announced that Immelt would retire as CEO and would be replaced by John L. Flannery. Immelt stepped down in October 2017.

== Later career ==
=== Uber ===
Immelt was initially a top candidate to become CEO of Uber, replacing founder Travis Kalanick. He was initially Kalanick's favorite for the post, in part because he was still open to Kalanick still having a significant role. However, Immelt's presentation before the board was poorly received; one director called it "a bad joke," and even Kalanick soured on him. Immelt withdrew from consideration after a director privately told him he had no chance at getting the job.

=== athenahealth ===
On February 7, 2018, Immelt became the executive chairman of the board at athenahealth, a private American health care company that provides network-enabled services for point-of-care mobile apps. Immelt joined the board of directors of Radiology Partners two weeks later. On June 6, 2018, Immelt was named executive chairman of athenahealth. Athenahealth was later acquired by Veritas Capital in 2019.

=== Tuya Smart ===
Immelt became a board member of Tuya Smart in September 2019. Immelt attended the Consumer Electronics Show in 2020 on behalf of Tuya Smart.

=== Built Robotics ===
On June 30, 2020, Immelt was announced as an advisor to Built Robotics, a company develops vehicular automation hardware and software. He joined Eric Sellman, Vice President of Civil at Mortenson, in the role.

== Philanthropy ==
=== Charitable activities ===
Immelt is also an active philanthropist. He is on the board of two non-profit organizations. He was a Charter Trustee of his alma mater, Dartmouth, from 2008 to 2016. He has also served Dartmouth on its Alumni Council and as a class officer.

Immelt has spoken about the benefits of football to his career. He announced a series of initiatives with NFL Commissioner Goodell including a GE investment of $40 million to develop diagnostic equipment for use in head trauma injuries, and GE's participation in a separate $20 million effort to develop safer helmets and other equipment.

The GE Foundation has been praised for its charitable contributions under Immelt's leadership.

Immelt has returned to his hometown High School, Finneytown, to contribute to the Finneytown Schools Education Foundation. The Foundation established the Jeff Immelt Award for leadership in football.

=== Public service ===
Immelt was chairman of The Business Council from 2005 to 2006.

Immelt was as a member of the board of the Federal Reserve Bank of New York from 2006 to 2011.

As one of America's top CEOs, Immelt has been a leading proponent of diversity in the work place, saying "If you're serious about ... making the world work better, the only discriminating factor should be excellence. In other words, GE is committed to diversity ...[because] ... it's the only way to do business right ... [GE is] committed to employing a diverse workforce with the most innovative minds in the world."

Immelt was appointed to the President's Economic Recovery Advisory Board in 2009 and appointed chairman in 2011. The council met four times, ending on January 17, 2012.

== Honors ==
Jeff Immelt has earned significant honors throughout his career, beginning with his graduation from Dartmouth cum laude and earning the Earl Hamilton Varsity Award, as a college football player, for friendship and character. Later in 2002, he received the Robert Fletcher Award from Dartmouth's Thayer School of Engineering.

=== Career honors ===
Barron's has named Immelt one of the "World's Best CEOs" three times; other outlets have criticized his performance. He is a member of The American Academy of Arts & Sciences. The Financial Times named him "Man of the Year" in 2003. Immelt was named to Time magazine's 100 most influential people in the world in 2009.

In 2009, Immelt won the Oslo Business for Peace Award, an award chosen by winners of the Nobel Prizes in Economics and Peace and given to managerial executives in the private sector who have demonstrated transformative and positive change through ethical business practices.

Immelt was awarded the 2014 American Football Coaches Association Tuss McLaughry Award, given to a distinguished American (or Americans) for the highest distinction in service to others. In accepting the award, he said "I am a product of football and I owe a great debt of gratitude to that system. What I learned playing football enters my life every day."

In April 2015, Immelt won the 20th edition of the Leonardo International Prize "as a foreigner who reinforced his country's cultural and economic ties with Italy."

On 24 December 2015, Immelt was ranked by the British online business blog and magazine Richtopia at number 50 in the list of 500 Most Influential CEOs.

In 2017, Immelt was honored with an Edison Achievement Award for his commitment to innovation throughout his executive managerial career.

== Personal life ==
Immelt is married to his wife Andrea and they have one daughter, Sarah. The two met as colleagues in General Electric. They lived in New Canaan, Connecticut, until 2015. They then purchased a home in Boston.

Business positions
Preceded by Jack Welch	Chairman and Chief Executive Officer of General Electric; 2001–2017	Succeeded by John L. Flannery
Political offices
Preceded by Paul Volcker as Chair of the President's Economic Recovery Advisory Board	Chair of the President's Council on Jobs and Competitiveness; 2011–2013	Position abolished
