= Chancellor University =

Private university in Cleveland, Ohio

Coordinates: 41°24′16″N 81°39′52″W

- Motto: "Your Opportunity University"
- Type: Private for-profit university
- Active: 1848–2013
- President: Robert C Daugherty
- Students: 770
- Undergraduates: 537
- Postgraduates: 233
- Location: Seven Hills, Ohio, United States
- Campus: Suburban
- Colors: Chancellor tan and Chancellor blue

Chancellor University was a private for-profit university in Cleveland, Ohio. The school was founded in 1848 as Folsom's Mercantile College to teach basic bookkeeping and business skills. It underwent several changes of name and ownership during its history. The college closed on August 25, 2013, at the conclusion of the summer semester.

== History ==
The university was opened by R.S. Bacon as a business college in 1848 on West 3rd Street in Cleveland, Ohio. Shortly thereafter it merged with Folsom's Mercantile College, founded by Ezekiel G. Folsom. Two of Folsom College's earliest students created the Bryant & Stratton Colleges which later acquired Folsom's school in a possibly forced merger. After the merger with the Bryant & Stratton system, the Cleveland school used the Bryant & Stratton name until 1867, when it took the name Union Business School to celebrate the Union's Civil War victory. The university in Cleveland was renamed Spencerian Business College in 1876 for one of its most illustrious administrators, Platt R. Spencer, educator and originator of Spencerian penmanship. The earliest curriculum was limited to the development of practical skills, such as penmanship, bookkeeping, and telegraphy. The most notable alumni of Chancellor University are oil magnate, John D. Rockefeller, rubber and tire trailblazer, Harvey Firestone, and accounting and professional services pioneer, Theodore Ernst cofounder of Ernst & Young.

In 1896, Frank L. Dyke, a former Spencerian professor, founded Dyke School of Commerce, dedicated to preparing young women for business careers. Dyke School of Commerce and Spencerian Business College operated separately for many years until the exigencies of World War II prompted President Jay R. Gates to merge the two schools in 1942. For a time the combined institution was known as Dyke and Spencerian College.

From 1958 to 1994, the school was known as Dyke College. After World War II, as college degrees became common in the business world, the college modified its academic programs to stress the attainment of the broader-based Bachelor of Science, Associate in Science, and Associate in Arts degrees. In 1965, the university was reincorporated as a not-for-profit institution.

The College changed its name to David N. Myers College in 1995, to reflect a $2 million charitable contribution from the prominent Cleveland alumnus and philanthropist. It was later renamed Myers University in the summer of 2001 to reflect expanded offerings including an MBA program. David N. Meyers University was closed in 2007.

In an effort to reorganize, on September 12, 2008, Myers University was renamed Chancellor University, as a for-profit institution with most of its courses offered online. On July 8, 2013, the school announced it would close. The school transferred its several hundred students to Alliant International University, a California-based, private, not-for-profit school.

== Academics ==
Chancellor University was a small university that offered a wide array of business programs, although it was not exclusively a business school. The university offered degrees at the associate, baccalaureate and master's levels.

The Master of Business Administration program at the university was renamed the Jack Welch Management Institute in 2009, after Jack Welch, the former CEO of General Electric, invested $2 million to purchase a 12% share of the company running the university, Chancellor University Systems. In 2011, the program was acquired by Strayer University for about $7 million.

== Accreditation ==
The university was accredited by the North Central Association Higher Learning Commission and the International Assembly for Collegiate Business Education (IACBE). In November 2008, the Higher Learning Commission of the North Central Association of Colleges and Schools placed the school on probation, citing problems with its reputation, student turnover and resource allocation. On February 25, 2010, the Higher Learning Commission ordered the institution to show cause as to why its accreditation should not be rescinded. On February 24, 2011, the Higher Learning Commission Board of Trustees determined that the institution had addressed the concerns of the commission and demonstrated that it met the criteria for accreditation. The board removed the show cause order and continued the accreditation of the university. However, the Higher Learning Commission issued a new "show cause" order on June 28, 2012. The "show cause" order was lifted by the Higher Learning Commission on October 11, 2012, and Chancellor University remained accredited with HLC.

On October 3, 2012, the Higher Learning Commission (HLC) accepted the withdrawal of Chancellor University from the commission effective October 3, 2013. The college closed after its summer semester ended on August 25, 2013.

== Campus ==
Chancellor University's main campus was located at 6000 Lombardo in the Genesis Building in Seven Hills, Ohio.
