= Open: An Autobiography =

Autobiography of professional tennis player

- The front cover of Open
- Author: Andre Agassi
- Language: English
- Genre: Autobiography
- Publisher: HarperCollins
- Publication date: November 9, 2009
- Publication place: United States
- Pages: 404
- ISBN: 9780307388407
- OCLC: 1058108646

Open: An Autobiography is a memoir written by former professional tennis player Andre Agassi with J. R. Moehringer, published on November 9, 2009.

In the book, the eight-time Grand Slam champion and former world No. 1 details his challenging childhood under the supervision of a demanding father and prolonged struggles with the physical and psychological tolls of professional tennis.

== Reception ==
Despite controversy surrounding Agassi's admission to using methamphetamine in 1997, the book reached No. 1 on the New York Times Best Seller list and was met with critical acclaim. Open "is not just a first-rate sports memoir but a genuine bildungsroman, darkly funny yet also anguished and soulful", Sam Tanenhaus wrote in the New York Times.

The book was an inspiration for the 2024 film Challengers.

== Summary ==
The memoir explores Agassi's journey from a financially disadvantaged upbringing to becoming a successful tennis player. It details his relationship with his father, who was strict and demanding, and his often passive mother, as well as his intense training regimen, which he initially resented. The book describes his personal struggles; the effects of relationships, particularly with actress Brooke Shields and fellow tennis player Steffi Graf; and the transformative experience of fatherhood.

== See also ==
- List of Grand Slam Men's Singles champions
- List of ATP number 1 ranked singles tennis players
