= Jack Welch Management Institute =

Online business school

- Motto: "Learn on Monday. Apply on Tuesday."
- Type: For-profit online business school
- Established: 2009; 17 years ago
- Parent institution: Strategic Education, Inc
- Affiliations: Strayer University
- CEO: Dean Sippel
- Students: ~1900 (2022)
- Location: Herndon, VA, USA
- Campus: Online
- Website: jackwelch.strayer.edu

The Jack Welch Management Institute (JWMI) at Strayer University is a for-profit online educational institution based in the United States, owned by Strategic Education, Inc. It was founded in 2009 by Jack Welch, former CEO of General Electric and his wife, Suzy Welch, author and public speaker. JWMI offers an online executive Master of Business Administration degree, graduate certificates, and executive certificates for working adults. The company is headquartered outside of Washington D.C. at Strayer University's corporate office - 2303 Dulles Station Blvd, Herndon, VA 20171.

== History ==
The Jack Welch Management Institute was sponsored by Chancellor University in 2009, when Welch invested $2 million to purchase a 12% share of the company running the university, Chancellor University Systems. The partnership investment was made possible due to the relationship between Jack Welch and entrepreneur Michael Clifford and allowed the school to emerge from bankruptcy. Chancellor named the MBA program The Jack Welch Management Institute.

Welch said that he wanted to create a high-quality MBA program that would integrate his philosophy of leadership and human resources into a 12-course program. Welch infused his personal principles into the curriculum.

The institute launched in June 2009, and classes began in January 2010. Initial pricing for the product in 2010 was $40,000 for an undergraduate degree and $26,000 for an MBA.

=== Acquisition by Strayer Education, Inc ===
In April 2011, Welch approached Robert Silberman, CEO and Chairman of Strayer Education, Inc., to discuss moving the institute to Strayer University. Welch paid nearly $2 million to buy back his namesake from Chancellor, stating that "Chancellor wasn't a good vehicle." Strayer Education, Inc purchased the Jack Welch Management Institute from Chancellor University in December 2011 for $7 million. Welch invested $2.8 million to Strayer Education as a representation of his economic interest in the program.

== Academic programs ==
The institute offers an accredited Master of Business Administration, graduate certificates, and executive certificates covering various business-related topics through online classes. The online MBA can be completed in 18-months. The graduate certificates can be completed in 9 months and the executive certificates are 6-week programs.

In March 2013, the institute launched a series of online, self-guided, self-paced management training programs under the Welch Way brand.

Welch developed the MBA curriculum, drawing from his management experience as CEO of GE and his experience teaching managers and executives at GE's Leadership Development Center. In addition to helping shape the program's curriculum, he held the title of distinguished professor at the institute. He regularly addressed students via video stream and held video conferences with them at the end of each term.

Welch expected the relatively low tuition and flexible schedule for the institute's MBA program to make it attractive to those currently employed but wishing to earn an MBA. He stated that he planned to grow the institute into the number one online business school in the world by 2016.

== Accreditations ==
- Accreditation Council for Business Schools and Programs (ACBSP) accreditation
- Middle States Commission on Higher Education (MSCHE) regional accreditation

== Rankings ==
=== Quacquarelli Symonds ===
- 2023, QS Online MBA Rankings: The Americas ranked number 32nd in the United States.

=== Poets & Quants ===
- 2024, Best Online MBA program ranked number 8.
- 2023, Best Online MBA program ranked number 6.
- 2022, Best Online MBA program ranked number 10.
- 2021, Best Online MBA program ranked number 20.
- 2020, Best Online MBA program ranked number 23.
- 2019, Best Online MBA program ranked number 11.

=== Princeton Review ===
- 2023, Top 50 Online MBA Program ranked number 7.
- 2022, Top 50 Online MBA Program ranked number 10.
- 2021, Top 50 Online MBA Program ranked number 15.
- 2020, Top 25 Online MBA Program ranked number 16.
- 2019, Top 25 Online MBA Program ranked number 18.
- 2018, Top 25 Online MBA Program ranked number 20.
- 2017, Top 25 Online MBA Program ranked number 22.

=== CEO Magazine ===
- 2024, Online MBA program ranked number 21 for global online rankings and number 4 for the top global online MBA program in North America.
- 2023, Online MBA program ranked number 19 for global online rankings and number 4 for the top global online MBA program in North America.
- 2022, Online MBA program ranked number 18 for global online rankings and number 3 for the top global online MBA program in North America.
- 2021, Online MBA program ranked number 19 for global online rankings and number 2 for the top global online MBA program in North America.
- 2020, Online MBA program ranked number 11 for global online rankings and number 2 for the top global online MBA program in North America.
- 2019, Online MBA program ranked number 10 for global online rankings and tied number 1 for the top global online MBA program in North America.
- 2018, Online MBA program ranked number 20 for global online rankings and number 5 for the top global online MBA program in North America.
- 2017, Online MBA program ranked number 12 for global online rankings and number 7 for the top global online MBA program in North America.
- 2016, Online MBA program tied for number 12 for global online rankings and tied number 5 for the top global online MBA program in North America.

=== Other Rankings ===
- 2015, Most influential education brand on LinkedIn.
