= J. R. Moehringer =

American journalist and ghostwriter (born 1964)

- Born: John Joseph Moehringer; December 7, 1964 (age 61); New York City, US
- Education: Yale University
- Occupations: Journalist, ghostwriter
- Children: 2

John Joseph Moehringer (born December 7, 1964), known by his pen name JR Moehringer, is an American journalist, memoirist, and biographical ghostwriter. In 2000, he won the Pulitzer Prize for newspaper feature writing.

He collaborated on the 2021 film adaptation of his memoir, The Tender Bar (2005).

== Early life and education ==
Moehringer was born to Dorothy and "Johnny Michaels" (John Moehringer), a WOR-FM radio DJ, in New York City and raised by a single mother in Manhasset, New York and Scottsdale, Arizona. He graduated from Saguaro High School in Scottsdale in 1982 and "graduated by a hair's breadth" from Yale University in 1986. His mother died in August 2019.

== Career ==
He began his journalism career as a news assistant at The New York Times. In 1990, he moved to Breckenridge, Colorado, where he worked at the Rocky Mountain News. In 1994 he became a reporter for the Orange County bureau of the Los Angeles Times.

In 1997, the Los Angeles Times sent him to Atlanta, Georgia, to report on the South as an on-the-scene reporter. His journalism work later took him to Denver, Colorado.

While at the Los Angeles Times he was a finalist for the Pulitzer Prize in Feature Writing in 1998 for his article "Resurrecting the Champ," and received the Pulitzer Prize in Feature Writing in 2000 for his article "Crossing Over."

He lives in the San Francisco Bay Area with his wife, Shannon Welch, former executive editor at HarperOne and VP and editorial director at Penguin Random House since 2021. They have two children.

Moehringer's memoir, The Tender Bar, was published in 2005. It recounts his childhood through his early twenties. It tells of his coming-of-age experiences at a local bar called Publicans (previously known as Dickens, later Edison's), which served as a sanctuary from his chaotic family life. A movie version of the memoir, The Tender Bar, directed by George Clooney and starring Ben Affleck, Tye Sheridan and Daniel Ranieri, was released on Amazon Prime on January 7, 2022. After retired tennis star Andre Agassi read The Tender Bar, he asked Moehringer to collaborate with him on his memoir. The resulting book, Open: An Autobiography, was published in 2009.

Moehringer wrote an article for the Los Angeles Times Magazine about a homeless man who claimed he was former boxer Bob Satterfield. In 2007, it was adapted as the basis of the film Resurrecting the Champ, directed by Rod Lurie and starring Samuel L. Jackson, Josh Hartnett, and Alan Alda.

Moehringer's novel Sutton, based on the life of bank robber Willie Sutton, was published in 2012.

Moehringer ghostwrote Phil Knight's memoir, Shoe Dog, published in 2016, and Prince Harry, Duke of Sussex's 2023 memoir, Spare. Moehringer says that he was stalked and harassed by the press and paparazzi after his name was leaked to the press ahead of the release of Spare.

Moehringer wrote, alongside Ari Emanuel, Roll the Calls, a 2026 memoir based on Emanuel's rise up the corporate ladder (with Knopf Doubleday as the publisher).

== Awards ==
- 1997 Livingston Award for Young Journalists
- 2000 Pulitzer Prize for Feature Writing
- 2001 Nieman Fellowship

== Bibliography ==
- Moehringer, J.R. The Tender Bar: A Memoir. New York: Hyperion, 2005. ISBN 1-4013-0064-2, ISBN 978-1401300647.
- Moehringer, J.R. Sutton. New York: Hyperion, 2012. ISBN 978-1-4013-2314-1.
