= John L. Flannery =

American business executive

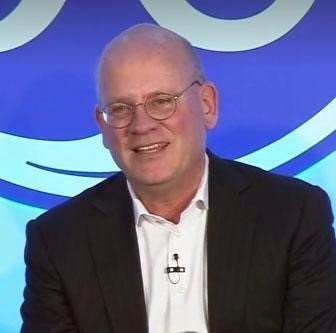
- Born: 1962 (age 63–64); Alexandria, Virginia, US
- Education: Fairfield University (BA); University of Pennsylvania (MBA)
- Occupation: Business executive
- Years active: 1987–2018
- Title: CEO and Chairman, General Electric
- Term: 2017–2018

John L. Flannery (born 1962) is an American business executive. He succeeded Jeff Immelt as the eleventh CEO and tenth chairman of General Electric, and was CEO from August 2017 until October 2018. Prior to ascending to the CEO role, Flannery held leadership roles inside GE for nearly 30 years, heading GE Healthcare, GE India and other business units.

== Early life and education ==
John L. Flannery was born in 1962 in Alexandria, Virginia. The son of a banking executive at FDIC Corporation, he and his two older sisters lived in Alexandria until 1971, when they moved to West Hartford, Connecticut where his father became president of a small bank. He graduated from Northwest Catholic High School in 1979. Flannery received a bachelor's degree in finance from the Fairfield University Dolan School of Business in 1983. Flannery later went to business school at the University of Pennsylvania, where he received an MBA from the Wharton School of Business in 1987.

== Career ==
Flannery began his career at GE in 1987. He spent over 20 years at GE Capital holding various leadership roles in the United States, Latin America, and Asia. He was named a company officer in 2005.

In 2009, he was appointed president and CEO of GE India, and in 2013, head of Business Development for all of GE. Flannery helped oversee changes in the portfolio, including acquisitions and divestitures in financial services and industry.

Before his appointment as CEO of General Electric, Flannery led the turnaround of GE Healthcare, focusing on core imaging, creating digital platforms and solutions, and expanding its Life Sciences and cell therapy systems businesses. He also launched Sustainable Healthcare Solutions, which develops technology for healthcare providers.

Flannery was named CEO and Chairman of GE in August 2017. Flannery became GE's eleventh CEO and the company's tenth chairman. On October 1, 2018, he was unanimously voted out by the board of directors, "effective immediately" and replaced by board member and former longtime Danaher Corp. CEO, H. Lawrence Culp, Jr.

Flannery was named the new advisory director of Charlesbank Capital Partners, LLC in July 2019. He will work on evaluating new investment opportunities as well as growing equity value in the Charlesbank portfolio.

== Personal life ==
Based in Chicago as of June 2017, by August he was based in Boston. Flannery is married, with three children and a dog named after Mookie Betts. He is an ardent Red Sox fan, and his hobbies include reading, golf, and music.

Business positions
Preceded by Jeff Immelt	Chairman and Chief Executive Officer of General Electric; 2017–2018	Succeeded by H. Lawrence Culp Jr.
