= Chief executive officer =

Highest-ranking officer of an organization

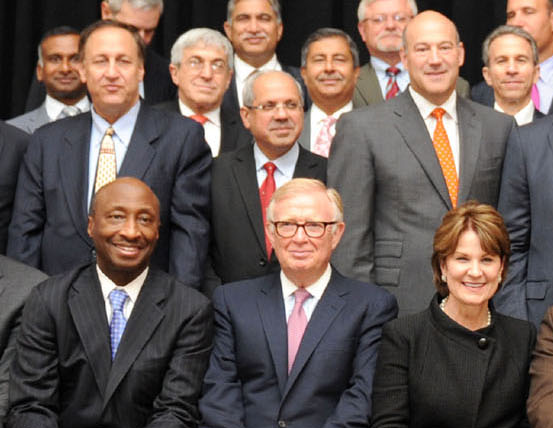
A group of Fortune 500 CEOs in 2015

A chief executive officer (CEO), also known as a chief executive, is the top-ranking corporate officer charged with the management of a company or a nonprofit organization.

CEOs find roles inside various organizations, including public and private corporations, nonprofit organizations, and even some government organizations (notably state-owned enterprises). The governor and CEO of a corporation or company typically report to the board of directors and are charged with maximizing the value of the business, which may include maximizing the profitability, market share, revenue, or another financial metric. In the nonprofit and government sector, CEOs typically aim at achieving outcomes related to the organization's mission, usually provided by legislation. CEOs are also frequently assigned the role of the main manager of the organization and the highest-ranking officer in the C-suite.

== Origins ==
The term "chief executive officer" is attested as early as 1782, when an ordinance of the Congress of the Confederation of the United States used the term to refer to governors and other leaders of the executive branches of each of the Thirteen Colonies. In draft additions to the Oxford English Dictionary published online in 2011, the Dictionary says that the use of "CEO" as an acronym for a chief executive officer originated in Australia, with the first attestation being in 1914. The first American usage cited is from 1972.

== Responsibilities ==
As an executive officer of the company, the CEO reports the status of the business to the board of directors, motivates employees, and drives change within the organization. As a manager, the CEO presides over the organization's day-to-day operations. The CEO is the person who is ultimately accountable for a company's business decisions, including those in operations, marketing, business development, finance, human resources, etc. The CEO of a political party is often entrusted with fundraising, particularly for election campaigns.

== Related positions ==
Depending on the organization, a CEO may have several subordinate executives to help run the day-to-day administration of the company, each of whom has specific functional responsibilities referred to as senior executives, executive officers, or corporate officers. Subordinate executives are given different titles in different organizations, but one common category of subordinate executive, if the CEO is also the president, is the vice president (VP). An organization may have more than one vice president, each tasked with a different area of responsibility (e.g., VP of finance, VP of human resources). Examples of subordinate executive officers who typically report to the CEO include the chief operating officer (COO), chief financial officer (CFO), chief strategy officer (CSO), chief marketing officer (CMO), and chief business officer (CBO). The public relations-focused position of chief reputation officer is sometimes included as one such subordinate executive officer, but, as suggested by Anthony Johndrow, CEO of Reputation Economy Advisors, it can also be seen as "simply another way to add emphasis to the role of a modern-day CEO – where they are both the external face of, and the driving force behind, an organization culture".

=== United Kingdom ===
In the UK, chief executive and chief executive officer are used in local government, where their position in law is described as the "head of paid service", and in business and in the charitable sector. As of 2013, the use of the term director for senior charity staff is deprecated to avoid confusion with the legal duties and responsibilities associated with being a charity director or trustee, which are normally non-executive (unpaid) roles. The term managing director is often used in lieu of chief executive officer.

=== United States ===
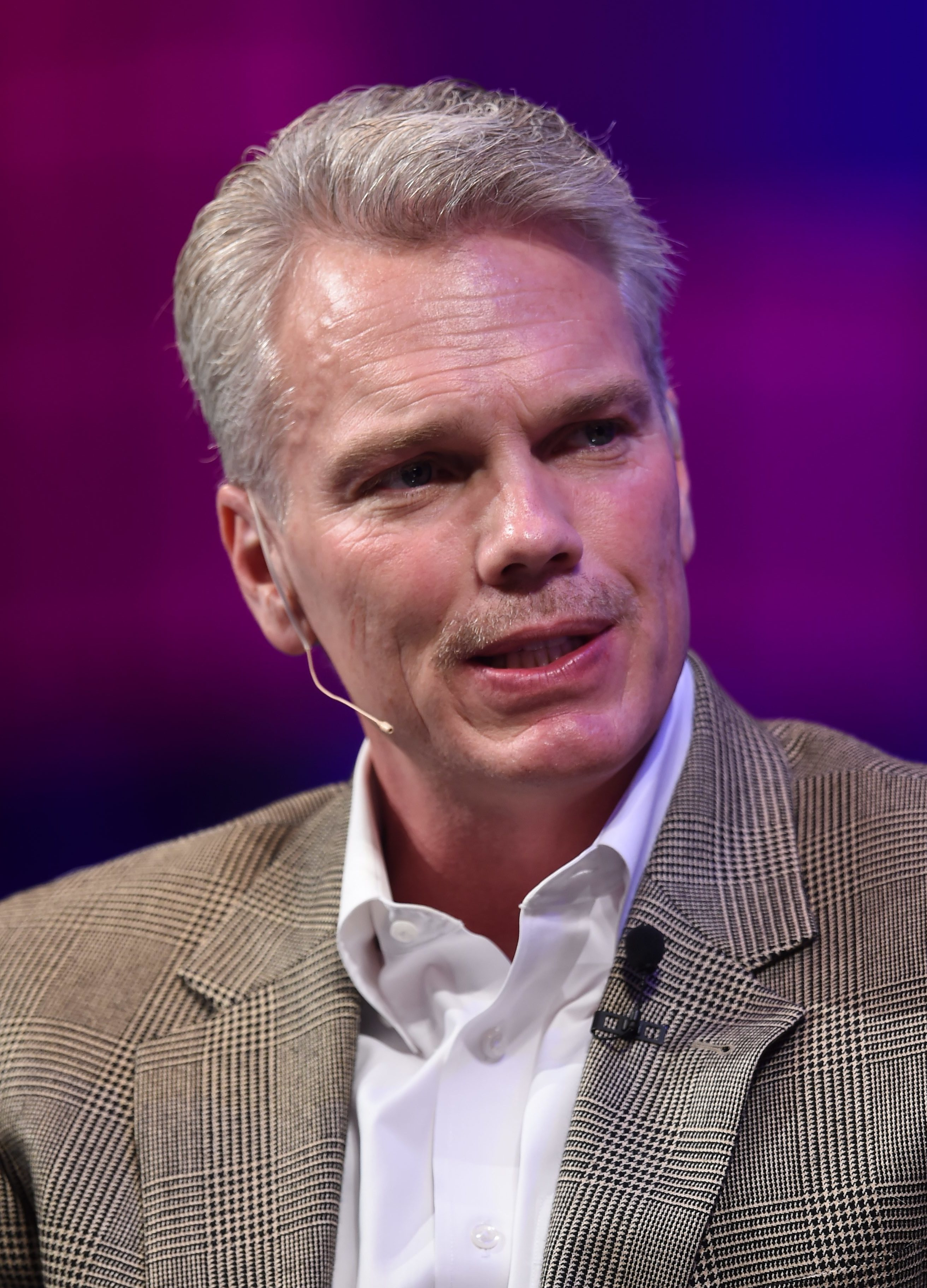
Brad D. Smith, CEO of Intuit from 2008 to 2018

In the US, the term "chief executive officer" is used primarily in business, whereas the term "executive director" is used primarily in the not-for-profit sector. These terms are generally mutually exclusive and refer to distinct legal duties and responsibilities. The CEO is the highest-ranking executive in a company, making corporate decisions, managing operations, allocating resources, and being the main point of communication between the board of directors and the company.

== Criticism ==
=== CEO selection and performance evaluation ===
CEOs and senior executives are governed by the board of directors. The proper selection and evaluation of the CEO and the executive team is critical to the company’s performance. Yet there is no established standard framework to evaluate and govern the CEO performance. Aside from Sarbanes Oxley Act legal standard to govern the financial reporting of public companies and hold the CEO & CFO accountable, there are no industry standards to test the CEO competency and actions or to help align the performance of the executive team with the shareholders' interest and performance expectations. One initiative proposes a standardized questionnaire used in annual CEO reviews and senior executive recruitment. These questionnaires help guide CEO strategy and assure the shareholders that the company and its executive team are on the right track. According to the Executive Institute, the top 10 questions every board must ask its CEO, include the following:

- Are we in the right business/market segment(s)? What are the growth areas to invest in and loss areas to divest?
- What are the emerging PESTEL (Political, Economic, Societal, Technological, Environmental & Legal) risks and opportunities?
- What market data supports our strategy?
- What are our strengths, weaknesses, opportunities and threats (SWOTs)?
- What are we doing to address each one of the SWOTs?
- What are our core competencies? How we can leverage them better?
- What are the operational or execution risks, and how do you manage them?
- What are our key performance indicators (KPIs) and targets that help us measure our performance?
- How do you plan to achieve those targets and in what timeframe?
- How can we build a sustainable competitive advantage?

Every CEO and C-level executive must be able to provide specific answers to the preceding questions, readily and clearly. Additionally, these questions can also be used as a framework for evaluating potential candidates for the succession planning and selection process.

=== Executive compensation ===
Executive compensation has been a source of criticism following a dramatic rise in pay relative to the average worker's wage. For example, the relative pay was 20-to-1 in 1965 in the US, but had risen to 376-to-1 by 2000. The relative pay differs around the world, and, in some smaller countries, is still around 20-to-1. Observers differ as to whether the rise is due to competition for talent or due to lack of control by compensation committees. In recent years, investors have demanded more say over executive pay.

=== Diversity ===
Lack of diversity amongst chief executives has also been a source of criticism. In 2018, 5% of Fortune 500 CEOs were women. In 2023 the number rose to 10.4% of for Women CEO's of Fortune 500 companies. The reasons for this are explained or justified in various ways, and may include biological sex differences, male and female differences in Big Five personality traits and temperament, sex differences in psychology and interests, maternity and career breaks, hypergamy, phallogocentrism, the existence of old boy networks, tradition, and the lack of female role models in that regard. Some countries have passed laws mandating boardroom gender quotas. In 2023 Rockefeller Foundation awarded a grant to Korn Ferry to research strategies and then action a plan to help more women to become CEO's.

== See also ==
- CEO succession
- CEO of public schools
- Glass cliff
- List of books written by CEOs
- List of chief executive officers
