= Vitality curve =

Performance management approach to rank employees

A vitality curve is a performance management practice that calls for individuals to be ranked or rated against their coworkers. It is also called stack ranking, forced ranking, and rank and yank. Pioneered by GE's Jack Welch in the 1980s, it has remained controversial. Numerous companies practice it, but mostly covertly to avoid direct criticism.

== Overview ==
The vitality model of former General Electric chairman and CEO Jack Welch has been described as a "20-70-10" system. The "top 20" percent of the workforce is most productive, and 70% (the "vital 70") work adequately. The other 10% ("bottom 10") are nonproducers and should be fired.

The often cited "80-20 rule", also known as the "Pareto principle" or the "Law of the Vital Few", whereby 80% of crimes are committed by 20% of criminals, or 80% of useful research results are produced by 20% of the academics, is an example of such rankings observable in social behavior. In some cases such "80-20" tendencies do emerge, and a Pareto distribution curve is a fuller representation.

=== Ratings ===
In his 2001 book Jack: Straight from the Gut, Welch says that he asked "each of the GE's businesses to rank all of their top executives". Specifically, top executives were divided into "A", "B", and "C" players. Welch admitted that the judgments were "not always precise".

According to Welch, "A" players had the following characteristics:

- Filled with passion
- Committed to "making things happen"
- Open to ideas from anywhere
- Blessed with much "runway" ahead of them
- Possess charisma, the ability to energize themselves and others
- Can make business productive and enjoyable at the same time
- Exhibit the "four Es" of leadership:
  - Very high Energy levels
  - Can Energize others around common goals
  - The "Edge" to make difficult decisions
  - The ability to consistently Execute

The vital "B" players may not be visionary or the most driven, but are "vital" because they make up the majority of the group. On the other hand, the "C" players are nonproducers. They are likely to "enervate" rather than "energize", according to Serge Hovnanian's model. Procrastination is a common trait of "C" players, as well as failure to deliver on promises.

=== Consequences ===
Welch advises firing "C" players, while encouraging "A" players with rewards such as promotions, bonuses, and stock options. However, if such rewards become a meaningful portion of "A" player's overall compensation, it can lead to perverse incentives, especially if the rewards of being an "A" player are predictable and recurring, such as a normal part of the annual review process. When broad-based stock compensation is the norm, avoiding perverse incentives can be difficult.

== Prevalence ==
It is difficult to gauge how prevalent forced ranking is, particularly because companies have started using more anodyne terms like talent assessment system or performance procedure. Some research, however, points to a downward trend. A 2006 article in Bloomberg Businessweek estimated that one-third of U.S. companies "evaluated employees based on systems that pit them against their colleagues". According to the Institute for Corporate Productivity, 42% of companies surveyed reported using a forced ranking in 2009. That, however, decreased to 14% in 2011.

In 2013, one human resources consultant estimated that 30% of Fortune 500 companies still used some sort of ranking system but often under a different name. A 2013 survey by WorldatWork, however, showed that it was used by about 12% of U.S. companies, whereas another by CEB in the same year found that it was used by 29% of companies.

According to a 2015 CEB study, 6% of Fortune 500 companies had ditched the forced ranking system, though it did not provide an estimate of how many companies still practiced it.

== Criticism ==
=== Morale ===
Stack ranking pits employees against their coworkers in what has been described as a Darwinian "survival of the fittest", leading employees to "feel unmotivated and disengaged" as well as creating "unnecessary internal competition that can be destructive to synergy, creativity and innovation and pull focus from marketplace completion". Furthermore, people who belong to an exceptionally talented team may suffer attrition if they know a certain number of their team will be given lower grades than if they were part of a less talented team.

=== Cost ===
According to CEB, an average manager spends more than 200 hours a year on activities related to performance reviews, including training and filling out and delivering evaluations. Adding in the cost of the performance-management technology itself, CEB estimated that a company of about 10,000 employees spends roughly $35 million a year on reviews. Additionally, jettisoned employees provide the competition with fresh talent.

=== Discrimination ===
Forced ranking systems may lead to biased decision-making and discrimination. Employees at Microsoft, Ford, and Conoco have filed lawsuits against their employers, saying that forced ranking systems are inherently unfair "because they favor some groups of employees over others: white males over blacks and women, younger managers over older ones and foreign citizens over Americans". For example, around 2001, Ford used a forced ranking system with three grades, A, B, and C, with quotas preset to 10%, 80%, and 10%. After a class action lawsuit, which it settled for $10.5 million, it stopped using the system.

=== Lack of empirical evidence ===
Rob Enderle has argued that "No sane person could sustain the argument for forced ranking once it's applied to products instead of people. Apply it to automobiles and make 20 percent or even 10 percent of any run unsatisfactory by policy, regardless of actual quality, and you'd immediately see that you were institutionalizing bad quality. With people, though, folks remain blind to the fact that forced ranking is a walking example of confirmation bias."

Jeffrey Pfeffer and Robert I. Sutton have criticized the practice on the grounds that there is limited empirical evidence of its overall usefulness to organizations.

=== Unrealistic assumptions ===
The model assumes that the players do not change their rating. In practice even the fear of being selected as a "C" player may result in an employee working harder, reducing the number of "C" players.

Some critics believe that the 20-70-10 model fails to reflect actual human behavior. Among randomly selected people assigned to a task, such a model may be accurate. They contend, however, that at each iteration, the average quality of employees will increase, making for more "A" players and fewer "C" players. Eventually, the "C" players comprise less than 10% of the workforce.

The style may make it more difficult for employees to cross rate from one division to another. For example, a "C" employee in a company's customer service division would be at a disadvantage applying for a job in marketing, even though they may have talents consistent with an "A" rating in the other division.

=== Management philosophy ===
This is a competitive model of organization. The criticisms of both the morality and actual effectiveness of such a dog-eat-dog method of social cohesion apply. Challenges to the model include: "C" player selection methods; the effect of office politics and lowered morale on productivity, communication, interoffice relations; and cheating. Rank-based performance evaluations (in education and employment) are said to foster cut-throat and unethical behavior. University of Virginia business professor Bruner wrote: "As Enron internally realized it was entering troubled times, rank-and-yank turned into a more political and crony-based system". Forced ranking systems are said to undermine employee morale by creating a zero-sum game that discourages cooperation and teamwork. They also tend to change norms of reciprocity that characterise the interactions among employees. In terms of Adam Grant's notion of "giver", "taker", and "matcher cultures", forced ranking systems are found to make it less likely for a "giver culture" to be present among employees, as individuals shift to "matcher" or "taker" behaviour.

Rank and yank contrasts with the management philosophies of W. Edwards Deming, whose broad influence in Japan has been credited with Japan's world leadership in many industries, particularly the automotive industry. "Evaluation by performance, merit rating, or annual review of performance" is listed among Deming's Seven Deadly Diseases. It may be said that rank-and-yank puts success or failure of the organization on the shoulders of the individual worker. Deming stresses the need to understand organizational performance as fundamentally a function of the corporate systems and processes created by management in which workers find themselves embedded. He sees so-called merit-based evaluation as misguided and destructive.

=== Specific examples ===
According to Qualtrics CEO Ryan Smith, stack-ranking and similar systems are suitable for ranking sales personnel among whom the management wishes to foster a spirit of competition, but less suitable for engineers, among whom management may want to encourage closer collaboration.

According to a 2006 MIT study cited by Bloomberg Businessweek, forced ranking can be particularly detrimental for a company undergoing layoffs: "As the company shrinks, the rigid distribution of the bell curve forces managers to label a high performer as a mediocre. A high performer, unmotivated by such artificial demotion, behaves like a mediocre."

MIT Research Fellow Michael Schrage has argued that the forced ranking policy has perverse effects even in organizations that are successful: "Organizations intent on rigorous self-improvement and its measurement inevitably confront an evaluation paradox: The more successful they are in developing excellent employees, the more trivial and inconsequential the reasons become for rewarding one over the other. Perversely, truly effective objective employee-evaluation criteria ultimately lead to personnel decisions that are fundamentally rooted in arbitrary and subjective criteria. [...] The coup de grace occurs when the top employees are all told that they must collaborate better with one another even as they compete in this rigged game of managerial musical chairs."

== Companies using the system ==
=== IBM ===
IBM has used a vitality curve program called Personal Business Commitments (PBC) since before 2006. For IBM, the main thrust of the strategy is to reduce workforce and shift personnel to lower-cost geographies by using a pseudo-objective rationale. The PBC process starts with a corporate distribution target, which is applied at the lowest levels of the hierarchy and then iteratively applied through the higher levels. The process involves meetings where managers compete for a limited number of favorable rankings for their employees. An employee's rating is thus dependent not only on the manager's opinion but also on the ability of the manager at "selling" and how much influence the first-line manager has on the second-line manager (for example, if the first-line manager is rated highly, that manager's employees are more likely to be ranked highly).

=== AIG ===
Under the leadership of Bob Benmosche, American International Group (AIG) implemented a five-point system in 2010, with a split of 10%/20%/50%/10%/10%. The top 10% are deemed "1s" and receive the largest bonuses; the next 20% are "2s" and receive somewhat smaller bonuses; the bulk consists of "3s", which get the smallest bonuses. The "4s" receive no bonuses, and the "5s" are fired unless they improve. According to Jeffrey Hurd, AIG's senior vice president of human resources and communications, "Prior to this, everyone was above-average...You never really knew where you stood."

=== Yahoo ===
Yahoo CEO Marissa Mayer instituted its "QPR" (quarterly performance review) system in 2012, using the rankings: Greatly Exceeds (10%) Exceeds (25%), Achieves (the largest pool at 50%), Occasionally Misses (10%) and Misses (5%).

In a new version for the fourth quarter 2013, sources said the percentages are changing, but only at the discretion of leadership within the units: Greatly Exceeds (10%), Exceeds (35%), Achieves (50%), Occasionally Misses (5%) and Misses (0%). This new evaluation system resulted in 600 layoffs in the fourth quarter of 2013.

=== Amazon ===
Excerpt from The New York Times

Amazon holds a yearly Organization Level Review, where managers debate subordinates' rankings, assigning and reassigning names to boxes in a matrix projected on the wall. In recent years, other large companies, including Microsoft, General Electric and Accenture Consulting, have dropped the practice — often called stack ranking, or "rank and yank" — in part because it can force managers to get rid of valuable talent just to meet quotas.

The review meeting starts with a discussion of the lower-level employees, whose performance is debated in front of higher-level managers. As the hours pass, successive rounds of managers leave the room, knowing that those who remain will determine their fates.

Preparing is like getting ready for a court case, many supervisors say: To avoid losing good members of their teams — which could spell doom — they must come armed with paper trails to defend the wrongfully accused and incriminate members of competing groups. Or they adopt a strategy of choosing sacrificial lambs to protect more essential players. "You learn how to diplomatically throw people under the bus", said a marketer who spent six years in the retail division. "It's a horrible feeling." [...]

Many women at Amazon attribute its gender gap — unlike Facebook, Google, or Walmart, it does not currently have a single woman on its top leadership team — to its competition-and-elimination system.[...]

The employees who stream from the Amazon exits are highly desirable because of their work ethic, local recruiters say. In recent years, companies like Facebook have opened large Seattle offices, and they benefit from the Amazon outflow.

Recruiters, though, also say that other businesses are sometimes cautious about bringing in Amazon workers, because they have been trained to be so combative. The derisive local nickname for Amazon employees is "Amholes" — pugnacious and work-obsessed.

=== Other companies ===
Other companies that use the system include Dell, Cisco Systems, Conoco, and Canva.

== Former companies ==
=== Microsoft ===
Since the 2000s, Microsoft has used a stack ranking system similar to the vitality curve. Many Microsoft executives noted that company "superstars did everything they could to avoid working alongside other top-notch developers, out of fear that they would be hurt in the rankings", and that ranking stifled innovation, as employees were more concerned about making sure that their peers or rival projects failed than of proposing new inventions, turning the company into a "collection of non-cooperating fiefdoms, unable to catch on to many technology trends". The stack ranking system was relatively secretive for a long time at Microsoft; non-manager employees were supposed to pretend they did not know about it.

Microsoft was involved in lawsuits regarding its forced ranking system as early as 2001. Detractors argued that the use of the system in small groups was inherently unfair and favored the employees who socialized more heavily over actual technical merit. At the time, Microsoft officially claimed through Deborah Willingham, Microsoft's senior vice president for human resources, that it had no such "stack rank" system.

In 2006, Microsoft began to use a vitality curve, despite intense internal criticism. Posts on "the curve" by Who da'Punk, an anonymous blogger internal to the company, on his blog Mini-Microsoft became a hot topic of commentary by other presumed employees.

According to one source, by 1996 Microsoft had already adopted a stack ranking system which led managers to deliberately retain subpar staff in order to keep their higher performers:

Microsoft managers are generally supposed to allocate reviews according to the following ratios: 25 percent get 3.0 or lower; 40 percent get 3.5; and 35 percent get 4.0 or better. Employees with too many successive 3.0 reviews are given six months to find another position in the company or face termination. A manager who is top-heavy with valuable or talented people doesn't want to be forced to give them 3.0 reviews. So these managers kept a few extra slabs of deadwood around so as to save the higher reviews for the employees they want to keep.

In a memo to all Microsoft employees dated April 21, 2011, chief executive Steve Ballmer announced the company would make the vitality curve model of performance evaluation explicit: "We are making this change so all employees see a clear, simple, and predictable link between their performance, their rating, and their compensation". The new model had five buckets, each of a predefined size (20%, 20%, 40%, 13%, and 7%), which management used to rank their reports. All compensation adjustments were predefined based on the bucket, and employees in the bottom bucket were ineligible to change positions since they would have the understanding that they might soon be yanked.

Following Ballmer's announced departure, on November 12, 2013, Microsoft's HR chief Lisa Brummel announced they were abandoning the practice.

The practice at Microsoft became a topic of significant media attention following Kurt Eichenwald's 2012 Vanity Fair article called "Microsoft’s Lost Decade". According to a subsequent article by Nick Wingfield in The New York Times Bits blog, "While that story overstated the harmful effects of stack ranking in the view of many Microsoft employees, it clearly represented the views of many others...The negative publicity around Microsoft's old employee review system reverberated loudly around the company, according to people who work there...The executive who spoke [to Wingfield] on condition of anonymity recalled Ms. Brummel saying: "I hope I never have to read another article about our review system ever again."

=== General Electric ===
General Electric, by far, was the most famous company to use the form of corporate management. However, since Welch's departure from the company, less emphasis has been placed on eliminating the bottom 10%, with more emphasis placed on team-building. During Welch's leadership, the system was dubbed "rank and yank". The New York Times reported in 2015 that the company dropped the evaluation method.

=== Other companies ===
Companies that previously used the system but have abandoned it include Ford (2001), Adobe Systems (2012), Medtronic, Kelly Services, New York Life, Juniper Networks, Accenture (2016), Goldman Sachs (2016) and Gap Inc.

== See also ==
- Jack Welch
- Enron
- Up or out
- Elo score (metaphorical meaning)
