= Shoe Dog =

2016 Memoir by Nike co-founder Phil Knight

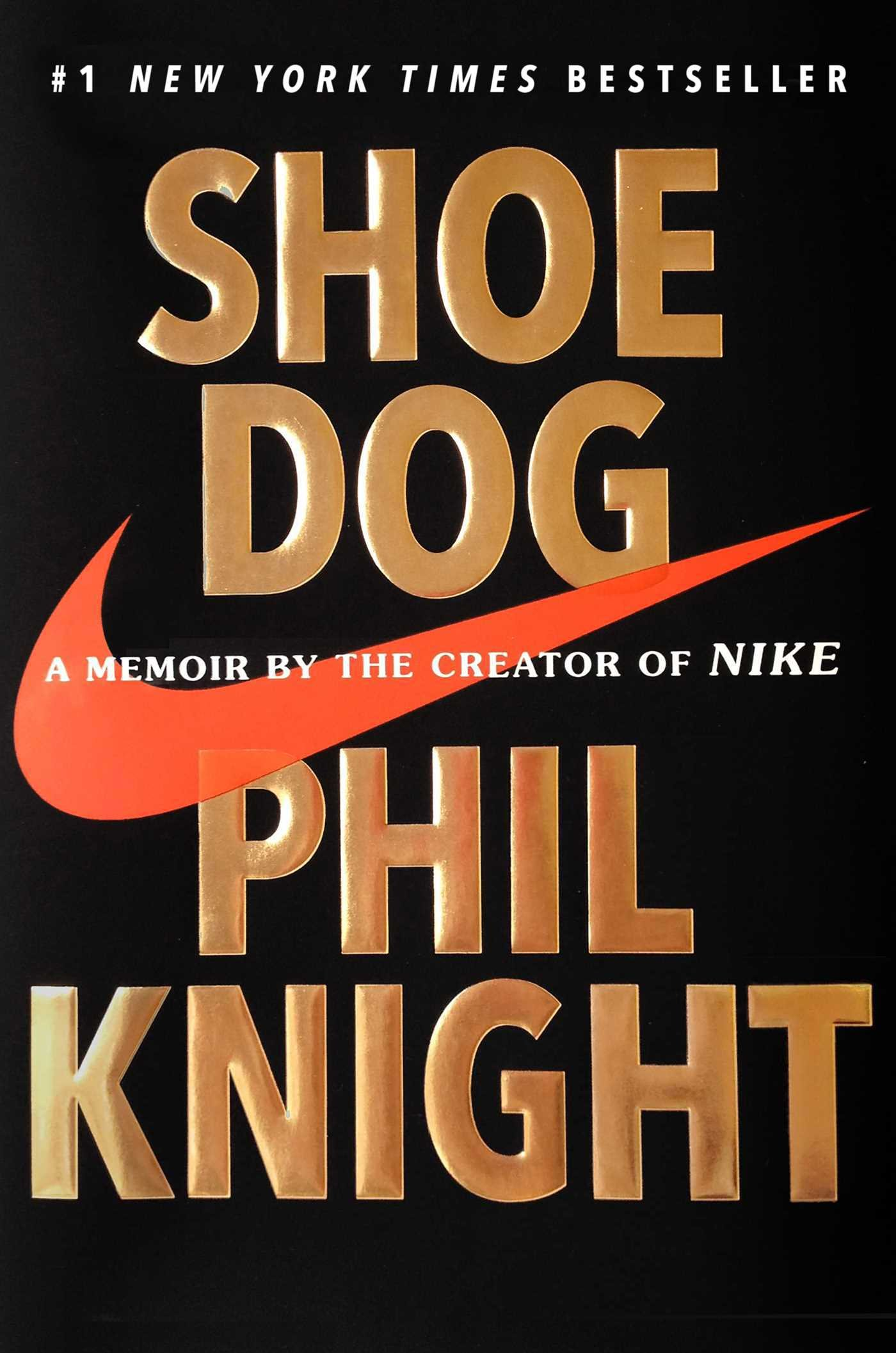
- US cover
- Author: Phil Knight
- Language: English
- Genre: Memoir
- Publisher: Simon & Schuster (UK); Scribner (US)
- Publication date: April 26, 2016; 10 years ago
- Pages: 386
- ISBN: 978-1-4711-4672-5

Shoe Dog is a memoir by Nike co-founder Phil Knight. The memoir chronicles the history of Nike from its founding as Blue Ribbon Sports and its early challenges to its evolution into one of the world's most recognized and profitable companies. It also highlights certain parts of Phil Knight's life. The book was ghostwritten by J. R. Moehringer.

Bill Gates named Shoe Dog one of his five favorite books of 2016 and called it "an amazing tale, a refreshingly honest reminder of what the path to business success really looks like. It's a messy, perilous, and chaotic journey, riddled with mistakes, endless struggles, and sacrifice. Phil Knight opens up in ways few CEOs are willing to do."

In July 2018, Netflix announced a biopic adaptation, written by Ed Wood writers Scott Alexander and Larry Karaszewski and produced by Knight and 5-time Oscar nominee Frank Marshall.

== Response ==
- Released on April 26, 2016, by Simon & Schuster, Shoe Dog reached fifth on The New York Times Best Seller List for business books in July 2018.
- Warren Buffett wrote that "The best book I read last year was Shoe Dog by Nike's Phil Knight... a very wise, intelligent and competitive fellow who is also a gifted storyteller."

== Legacy and Future ==
- On September 26, 2017, Knight released an abridged version of his memoir, titled Shoe Dog: Young Readers Edition, suitable for younger audiences.
- In 2018 it was announced that Netflix had purchased the film rights to Shoe Dog: A Memoir by the Creator of Nike and that development had begun on the project with Knight attached as creative guide and producer (Netflix). Academy Award nominated producer Frank Marshall, a longtime friend of Knight's, will be producing alongside Knight. As of May 2026, a release date has not been announced.
