= CEO of public schools =

Manager of a public school district

A chief executive officer of public schools, or CEO of schools, is an educational professional who is responsible for the administration of a public school district. Similarly to a receiver, CEOs replace traditional superintendents in managing the daily operations of struggling school districts in an attempt to improve failing schools. With the introduction of private market ideas into the school system, CEOs are generally given unilateral power to enact necessary reforms. This concept was first introduced by the Chicago Public School System in 1995.

== Function and purpose ==
The functions of the CEO vary from school district to school district. Whereas the CEO mostly replaces both the roles of the school board and superintendent, other school districts place the CEO below the superintendent and grant power over the day-to-day operations. In Chicago, the CEO has the power to appoint the school board. However, in other school districts with elected school boards, the CEO is often appointed in spite of the board. Using a CEO in a public school system mirrors the typical structure of a charter school which, perhaps, serves as the inspiration for using a CEO of a public school.

== Comparison to superintendents ==
A CEO is different from a superintendent in that the CEO of schools has total control over every decision made by a school district; the CEO decides what rights, if any, are delegated to the board of education. A CEO of Schools often needs no background in education. The goal of implementing a CEO of schools is to remove power from School Boards of ineffective school districts and replace with an individual to bring private market business ideas to the education system. It is a way to address the inequality of public schools and attempt to raise failing schools to a functional level.

== Historical development ==
The first school district in the United States to appoint a CEO was the Chicago Public School district, who appointed Paul Vallas as CEO in 1995. Baltimore implemented reforms to its school system in 1997 which led to the appointment of a CEO. Cleveland soon followed suit by appointing Barbara Byrd-Bennett as CEO under Mayoral Control in 1998.

== Controversy ==
The appointment of CEO has proven controversial in some instances. The attempt to appoint a CEO of the Youngstown, Ohio school system has been met with a lawsuit. The lawsuit was unsuccessful. Proponents argue that, by removing local control and placing it in the hands of a CEO, it creates a more efficient system which can turn around the school system. Opponents argue that it strips local control and accountability from the management of the school systems.

Another controversy has centered around Barbara Byrd-Bennett, the former CEO of Chicago Public Schools and later Cleveland Metropolitan School District. Byrd-Bennett was the subject of a 23-count federal indictment accusing her of executing a scheme to give a $20-million no-bid contract in return for a kick-back. She entered a guilty plea on October 13, 2015.

Barbara Byrd-Bennett Indictment

== Examples of CEOs of schools ==
- The Baltimore City Public School System installed Gregory E. Thornton as CEO for the 2014-2015 school year. Of note, Thornton has taken an approach which has restored funding for the arts and reduced school suspensions.
- The CEO of the Chicago Public Schools is Pedro Martinez. The system implemented by Paul Vallas utilized quantitative metrics by which both students and schools were evaluated; under-performing students were held back and under-performing schools were placed on probation. This resulted in the closure of 82 under-performing schools, replaced by 116 new schools.
- The Cleveland Metropolitan School District installed Eric Gordon as CEO in 2011. Mr. Gordon has implemented a "Humanware" Initiative which seeks to improve "student safety, support, and social and emotional development." Cleveland had the lowest graduation rate of urban school districts in the country as of 2006.
- The CEO of Minneapolis Public Schools, Michael Goar, served below the Superintendent before being promoted to superintendent. As a sign of the struggles of the school district, African American male students only had a literacy rate of 20%.
- School District of Philadelphia appointed a CEO in the year 2000.
- The CEO of Youngstown City School District and Ohio Governor John Kasich signed a bill creating the position of CEO of the Youngstown City School District. The School District sued to overturn the Bill and prevent the appointment of a CEO. The litigation is ongoing and the State of Ohio filed a Motion to Dismiss.
