= Suzy Welch =

American journalist and writer

- Born: Suzanne R. Spring; 1959 (age 66–67); Portland, Oregon, U.S.
- Other names: Suzy Wetlaufer; Suzanne R. Wetlaufer
- Occupations: Co-Founder, Jack Welch Management Institute, Business Advisor, Television Commentator
- Known for: Jack Welch affair author
- Spouse(s): Eric Wetlaufer (1984–2000); Jack Welch (2004–2020; his death)
- Children: 4

Suzy Welch (nee Spring, born 1959) is an American journalist. She co-authored (with her husband Jack Welch) the business books Winning, published in 2005, and The Real Life MBA, published in 2015.

== Early life and education ==
In 1959, Welch was born as Suzanne Spring in Portland, Oregon. Welch's parents are Phyllis and Bernard Spring. She was primarily raised in New York and New England. Her father is an architect and architectural school administrator. Starting in tenth grade Welch attended Phillips Exeter Academy, and Radcliffe College (Harvard, 1981), and Harvard Business School, from which she graduated as a Baker Scholar in 1988, in the top five percent of her class.

== Career ==
Welch started her career as a reporter with the Miami Herald and then with the Associated Press. After business school, she worked for several years at Bain & Company, a management consulting firm based in Boston. She was later named editor-in-chief of the Harvard Business Review. She has written a novel, and authored and edited numerous books and articles dealing with leadership, organizational change, and human resource management.

In early 2002, Welch (then known by her married name Suzy Wetlaufer) was forced to resign from the Harvard Business Review after admitting to an affair with the then-married Jack Welch, the former chief executive officer of General Electric, while preparing an interview with him for the magazine. The affair was brought to the attention of the Review by Jane Welch, Welch's wife at the time. Jack Welch and Jane Welch divorced and he then married Suzy. Suzy had the interview pulled before it appeared in the Business Review.

Together with her husband, Jack Welch, Suzy has co-authored several books including, Winning, its companion volume, Winning: The Answers, and The Real Life MBA: Your No-BS Guide to Winning the Game, Building a Team and Growing Your Career. Jack and Suzy also wrote "The Welch Way", a weekly column on business and career challenges that appeared in BusinessWeek magazine from 2005 to 2009 and was published in 45 newspapers across the world by The New York Times Syndicate. Together, they also founded Jack Welch Management Institute, an online MBA program. Suzy Welch sold her interest in the school after her husband died.

She has written about work–life balance and other cultural issues for publications including O, The Oprah Magazine and The Wall Street Journal. In addition, she has been a commentator on television programs including Good Morning America, The View, Morning Joe, Your World With Neil Cavuto, and Power Lunch. Her career expertise and perceptive commentary have made her a regular contributor on The TODAY Show and Bulls & Bears.

In 2023, Suzy was appointed to the faculty of the NYU Stern School of Business, where she teaches “Becoming You: How to Craft the Authentic Life You Want and Need.”

== Personal life ==
Welch is formerly known as Suzy Wetlaufer. Welch is the mother of four adult children (from her previous marriage). She married Jack Welch, former CEO of General Electric, in 2004, after meeting him in October 2000. They remained married until his death in 2020.
