= Call Me Ted =

2008 book by Ted Turner

- Author: Ted Turner
- Language: English
- Genre: Autobiography
- Publication date: 2008
- Publication place: United States

Call Me Ted is an autobiography written by American businessman Ted Turner, released on November 10, 2008. The book was written over the course of three years with the help of Bill Burke, a former executive for TBS.

== Overview ==
After dropping out of college, Turner began working for his father's billboard company, slowly turning it into an international media empire, including the creation of the first 24-hour news channel CNN. Also discussed are some of Turner's more controversial business moves, such as the disastrous merger of his corporation Time Warner with AOL.

The book delves into Turner's personal life, including the death of his teenage sister, the suicide of his father, and his ten-year marriage to Jane Fonda, an Academy Award winning actress.

== Reception ==
Call Me Ted received fairly positive reviews. Some critics noted that his desire not to dwell in the past raises inherent difficulties when writing an autobiography. The details of his business transactions earned praise.

USA Today said that "Turner's personality infuses every page of Call Me Ted," and named it "One of the best business books of 2008." The Economist said that "Mr. Turner is surprisingly candid... There is a remarkable lack of regret in Mr. Turner's writing, or of defensiveness... Mr. Turner's mantra seems to be to keep moving on." The Daily Beast said, "The new memoir Call Me Ted makes the Mouth of the South seem like a pleasant-even modest!-creature."
