= Jack Welch =

American business executive (1935–2020)

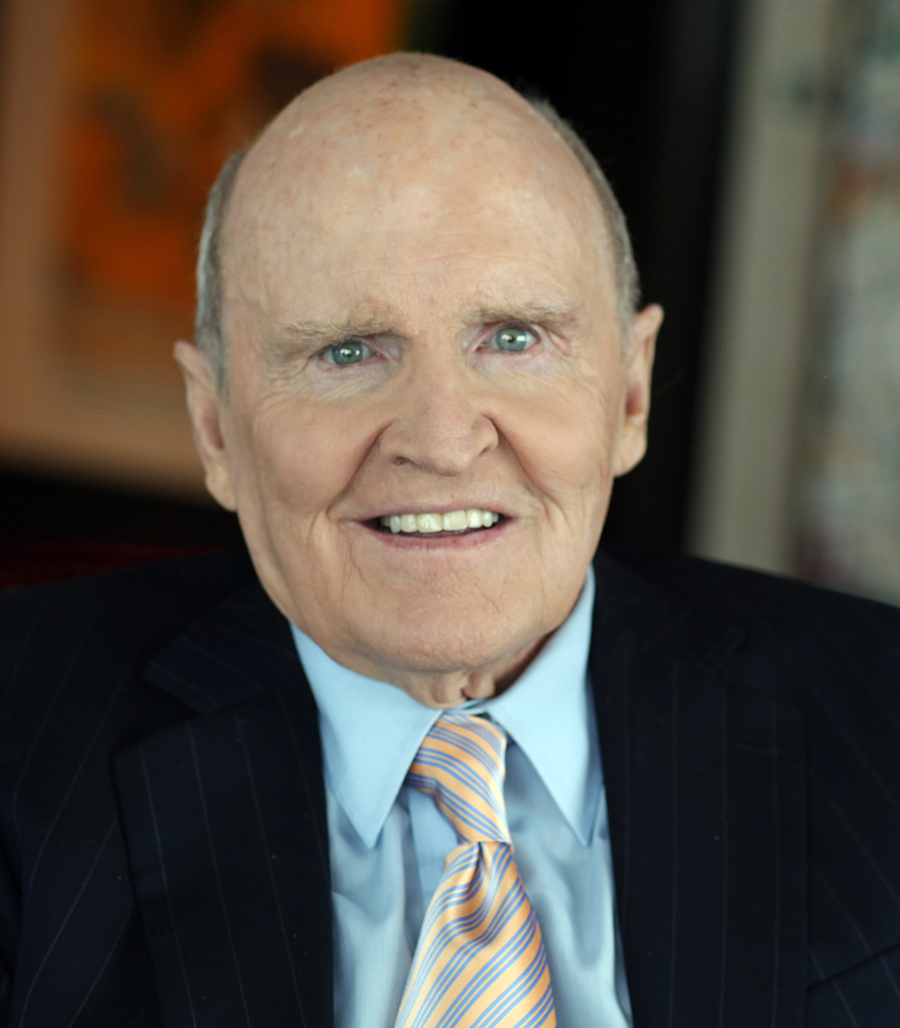
- Welch in 2012
- Born: John Francis Welch Jr. November 19, 1935; Peabody, Massachusetts, U.S.
- Died: March 1, 2020 (aged 84); New York City, New York, U.S.
- Education: University of Massachusetts Amherst (BS); University of Illinois at Urbana–Champaign (MS, PhD)
- Occupations: Business executive; chemical engineer; writer
- Title: Chairman & CEO of General Electric (1981–2001)
- Political party: Republican
- Spouses: Carolyn B. Osburn (m. 1959; div. 1987) Jane Beasley (m. 1989; div. 2003) Suzy Wetlaufer (m. 2004)
- Children: 4

John "Jack" Francis Welch Jr. (November 19, 1935 – March 1, 2020) was an American business executive. He was chairman and CEO of General Electric (GE) between 1981 and 2001. During his 20-year tenure, GE's market value grew from $14 billion to $600 billion, and he has frequently been cited as one of the greatest chief executives of the twentieth century.

Under Welch, GE acquired the RCA Corporation in 1986 and expanded aggressively into financial services through GE Capital, which came to account for 40% of the company's revenue. He also restructured GE around a philosophy that each of its business units must rank first or second in its market, shedding those that did not meet that standard. By the end of his tenure GE was the most valuable company in the world.

In later years, Welch's practices and legacy have drawn scrutiny from historians and journalists, particularly regarding his transformation of GE into a company heavily dependent on financial services. GE Capital collapsed in the wake of the 2008 financial crisis, and GE was eventually broken into three separate companies. Additionally, his emphasis on short-term financial performance over long-term investment has been cited as having had a lasting effect on American corporate culture, including at companies such as Amazon.

When Welch retired from GE, he received a severance payment of $417 million; at that time this was the largest such payment in business history. In 2006, Welch's net worth was estimated at $720 million.

== Early life and education ==
Jack Welch was born on November 19, 1935, in Peabody, Massachusetts, the only child of Grace (née Andrews), a homemaker, and John Francis Welch Sr., a Boston & Maine Railroad conductor. Welch was an Irish American and a Catholic. His paternal and maternal grandparents were both Irish.

Throughout his early life in middle school and high school, Welch found work in the summers as a golf caddie, newspaper delivery boy, shoe salesman, and drill press operator. Welch attended Salem High School, where he participated in baseball, football, and captained the hockey team.

Late in his senior year, Welch was accepted to University of Massachusetts Amherst, where he studied chemical engineering. Welch worked in chemical engineering at Sunoco and PPG Industries during his college summers. In his sophomore year, Welch became a member of the Phi Sigma Kappa fraternity. He graduated in 1957 with a Bachelor of Science degree in chemical engineering, turning down offers from several companies in order to attend graduate school at the University of Illinois Urbana-Champaign. Welch graduated from the University of Illinois in 1960, with a master's and a PhD in chemical engineering.

Welch later received an honorary Doctor of Science from University of Massachusetts Amherst in 1982, and in 2009 an honorary doctorate from University of California, Los Angeles.

== General Electric ==
Welch joined General Electric in 1960. He worked as a junior chemical engineer in Pittsfield, Massachusetts, at a salary of $10,500, which would be equivalent to approximately $112,000 in 2025 dollars. In 1961, Welch planned to quit his job as junior engineer because he was dissatisfied with the raise offered to him and was unhappy with the bureaucracy he observed at GE. Welch was persuaded to remain at GE by Reuben Gutoff, an executive at the company, who promised him that he would help create the small-company atmosphere Welch desired. In 1963, an explosion blew the roof off the factory under Welch's management, and he was almost fired.

By 1968, Welch became the vice president and head of GE's plastics division, which at the time was a $26 million operation for GE. Welch oversaw production as well as the marketing for the GE-developed plastics Lexan and Noryl. Not long afterward, in 1971, Welch also became the vice president of GE's metallurgical and chemical divisions. By 1973, Welch was named group executive, managing chemical, metallurgical, medical systems, appliance components and electronic components businesses. He held that position until 1979, which involved him working with the corporate headquarters, exposing him to many of the "big fish" he would one day be among. In 1977 Welch was named senior vice president and head of Consumer Products and Services Division, a position he held until 1979 when he became the vice chairman of GE.

In 1981, Welch became GE's youngest chairman and CEO, succeeding Reginald H. Jones. By 1982, Welch had dismantled much of the earlier management put together by Jones with aggressive simplification and consolidation. One of his primary leadership directives was that GE had to be No. 1 or No. 2 in the industries it participated in.

=== CEO ===
Through the 1980s, Welch sought to streamline GE. In 1981, he made a speech in New York City called "Growing fast in a slow-growth economy", which is often acknowledged as the "dawn" of the shareholder value movement. Under Welch's leadership, the market value of GE increased from $12 billion in 1981 to $410 billion when he retired, the company making 600 acquisitions while shifting into emerging markets. Welch pioneered a policy of informality at the workplace, allowing all employees to have a small-business experience at a large corporation. Welch worked to eradicate perceived inefficiency by trimming inventories and dismantling the bureaucracy that had almost led him to leave GE in the past. He closed factories, reduced payrolls and cut lackluster units.

Welch valued surprise and made unexpected visits to GE's plants and offices. He popularized so-called "rank and yank" policies used now by other corporate entities. Each year, Welch would fire the bottom 10% of his managers, regardless of absolute performance. He earned a reputation for brutal candor. Welch also rewarded those in the top 20% with bonuses and employee stock options. He also broadened the stock options program at GE, extending availability from top executives to nearly one third of all employees. Welch is also known for abolishing the nine-layer management hierarchy.

During the early 1980s, Welch was dubbed "Neutron Jack" (in reference to the neutron bomb) for eliminating employees while leaving buildings intact. In his autobiography Jack: Straight from the Gut, Welch stated GE had 411,000 employees at the end of 1980, and 299,000 at the end of 1985. Of the 112,000 who left the payroll, 37,000 were in businesses which GE sold off, and 81,000 were reduced in continuing businesses. In return, GE had tremendously increased its market capitalization. Welch reduced basic research, and closed or sold off under-performing businesses.

In 1986, GE acquired the RCA Corporation for $6.28 billion, the largest non-oil company merger in history up to that time. Welch and GE subsequently took up an office in the iconic RCA Building, later renamed the GE Building at 30 Rockefeller Plaza. The RCA acquisition resulted in GE liquidating or selling off virtually all of RCA's divisions and assets to other companies, and maintaining NBC as part of the GE portfolio of businesses. During the 1990s, Welch shifted GE's business from manufacturing to financial services through numerous other acquisitions.

Welch adopted Motorola's Six Sigma quality program in late 1995. In 1980, the year before Welch became CEO, GE recorded revenues of roughly $26.8 billion and in 2000, the year before he left, they were nearly $130 billion. By 1999, he was named "Manager of the Century" by Fortune magazine.

According to BusinessWeek in 1998, Welch's critics questioned whether the short-term performance pressure he placed on employees may have led them to "cut corners", thus contributing to subsequent scandals over defense-contracting, and/or the Kidder, Peabody & Co. bond-trading scheme in the early 1990s.

There was a lengthed succession planning saga prior to his retirement among James McNerney, Robert Nardelli, and Jeff Immelt, with Immelt eventually selected to succeed Welch as chairman and CEO. His successor plan had always been a priority, as noted in his 1991 speech "From now on, [choosing my successor] is the most important decision I'll make. It occupies a considerable amount of thought almost every day."

Welch's "walk-away" package from GE was not valued at the time of his retirement, but GMI Ratings estimates its worth at $420 million.

Welch served as Chairman of The Business Council in 1991 and 1992.

Upon his retirement from GE in 2001, Welch had stated that his effectiveness as its CEO for two decades would be measured by the company's performance for a comparable period under his successors. Welch had grown GE to over $450 billion in market capitalization, of which about 40% was in financial services.

=== Criticism ===
Twenty years later, the company's market capitalization was only $200 billion, a decrease of ~55%, and Welch refused to discuss its decline, other than noting much of the decline had resulted from investments in real estate, and that his immediate, handpicked successor Jeff Immelt had to deal with the after effects of the September 11, 2001 terrorist attack. The New York Times published a critical article in 2017, noting GE's stock price as overvalued under Welch because of the growth of the financial services sector, as well as describing the amalgamated corporation's decline in 16 years under Immelt, who likewise was one of the country's highest-paid managers and eventually sold off two of Welch's largest acquisitions, NBCUniversal and GE Capital.

Under Welch's leadership, GE waged a twenty-year battle with the Environmental Protection Agency and New York State over polychlorinated biphenyls (PCBs) that the company dumped into the Hudson River at its capacitor products division plant in Hudson Falls, New York, an accusation that Jack Welch stated multiple times as vastly overstated.

Welch disputed scientists who classified PCBs as forever chemicals that can cause negative health consequences. The chemicals contaminated the aquifer beneath the plant to the point that the water was unusable for human consumption without treatment. New York State's Department of Environmental Conservation also advised people against eating fish from the river near the site. He went on to call the Obama administration's prioritization of addressing climate change "radical behavior".

The following year, CEO Welch took issue with reclassification of GE in the Fortune 500 as a "diversified financial services company" rather than an "electrical equipment company", and by 2005 many had noted that the price-earnings ratios of the financial services sector were lower than that for GE. In 2014, GE Capital (the company's major financial services branch organized during Welch's tenure) agreed to the largest credit card discrimination settlement in history, concerning many years of deceptive marketing as well as discriminatory credit practices. After Welch's tenure, GE Capital had been labeled as "too big to fail" and had become regulated by the Federal Reserve. The retired Welch publicly praised his former firm's "slim-down" and return to being an industrial company. In 2018 Welch discussed the different financial culture in Kidder, Peabody & Co., whose acquisition he arranged during his tenure at GE, and whose ethos was based on short-term bonus calculations. Shortly before the settlement was announced, GE Capital renamed itself as Synchrony Bank; the spin-off took two years.

Welch's income and assets came under particular scrutiny during his divorce from his second wife, Jane Welch, in 2001, for adultery with the woman who became his third wife. Court filings during the divorce described Welch's GE compensation, which led to a Securities and Exchange Commission investigation of the then-retired Welch's employment contracts with GE.

In 1996, Welch and GE had agreed to a "retention package" worth $2.5 million, and which promised continued access after Welch's retirement to benefits he had received as CEO—including an apartment in New York, baseball tickets and the use of a private jet and chauffeured car. Welch stated that he did not want more money, nor a more traditional stock package, but instead preferred to retain the lifestyle he had enjoyed as GE's CEO. According to a 2008 interview with Welch, he had filed the agreement with the SEC, and addressed the media attention and accusations of being "greedy" by renouncing those benefits.

In 2012, Welch and his third wife, Suzy Welch, quit their business associations with Fortune magazine and Reuters news service after Fortune published an article which criticized Welch's tweet, shortly before the 2012 election, which alleged that the Obama administration manipulated certain economic statistics, as well as another article which elucidated the 100,000 jobs GE lost during his tenure as CEO.

== Later career ==
Following Welch's retirement from General Electric, he became an adviser to private equity firm Clayton, Dubilier & Rice and to the chief executive of IAC, Barry Diller. In addition to his consulting and advisory roles, Welch had been active on the public speaking circuit and co-wrote a popular column for BusinessWeek with his wife, Suzy, for four years until November 2009. The column was syndicated by The New York Times.

In September 2004, the Central Intelligence Agency published a parody of Welch applying his management skills while serving as imagined Deputy Director of Intelligence.

In 2005, he published Winning, a book about management co-written with Suzy Welch, which reached No. 1 on The Wall Street Journal bestseller list, and appeared on New York Times Best Seller list.

On January 25, 2006, Welch gave his name to Sacred Heart University's College of Business, which was known as the "John F. Welch College of Business" until 2016, when it began using the name the "Jack Welch College of Business". Since September 2006, Welch had been teaching a class at the MIT Sloan School of Management to a hand-picked group of 30 MBA students with a demonstrated career interest in leadership.

In December 2016, Welch joined a business forum assembled by then president-elect Donald Trump to provide strategic and policy advice on economic issues.

=== Jack Welch Management Institute ===
In 2009, Welch founded the Jack Welch Management Institute (JWMI), which is a program at Chancellor University that offered an online executive Master of Business Administration. The institute was acquired by Strayer University in 2011. Welch had been very actively involved with the curriculum, faculty and students since the beginning of the institution. JWMI's MBA program was recently named the number one most influential education brand on Linkedin and one of the top business schools to watch in 2016. The program has also been named one of the Top 25 Online MBA Programs four years in a row (2017, 2018, 2019, 2020) by The Princeton Review. Its goal is not to make money, but to build over time focusing on the quality of the program and increasing the number of students enrolled year after year.

At GE, Welch taught and grew leaders. He had taught at MIT Sloan School of Management and taught seminars to CEOs all over the globe. "More than 35 CEOs at today's top companies [were] trained under Jack Welch". JWMI students had direct access to Welch and he hosted quarterly video conferences with his students.

Along with his video conferences, Welch created many video responses to messages on bulletin boards and answered individual emails. His investment in the university was also reflected in his interest in the institute's Net Promoter score (NPS). He administered surveys on satisfaction regularly and scrutinized the results to find scores that needed improvement. In an interview with Wired Academic, Welch explained the overall status of his MBA program, stating that the persistence rate of students continuing on to a second year had grown from 90% to 95%, and that JWMI turns away very few students in the admissions process. He also said that he would like better leadership training for MBA students.

== Personal life ==
Welch had four children with his first wife, Carolyn. They divorced amicably in 1987 after 28 years of marriage. His second wife, Jane Beasley, was a former mergers-and-acquisitions lawyer. She married Welch in April 1989, and they divorced in 2003. While Welch had crafted a prenuptial agreement, Beasley insisted on a ten-year time limit to its applicability, and thus she was able to leave the marriage reportedly with around $180 million.

Welch's third wife, Suzy Wetlaufer (née Spring), co-authored his 2005 book Winning as Suzy Welch. She served briefly as the editor-in-chief of the Harvard Business Review. Welch's wife at the time, Jane Beasley, found out about an affair between Wetlaufer and Welch. Beasley informed the Review and Wetlaufer was forced to resign in early 2002 after admitting to the affair with Welch while preparing an interview with him for the magazine. They married on April 24, 2004.

Starting in January 2012, Welch and Suzy Welch wrote a biweekly column for Reuters and Fortune, which they both left on October 9, 2012, after an article critical of Welch and his GE career was published by Fortune.

== Death ==
Welch died from kidney failure at his home in New York City on March 1, 2020, at age 84. His funeral was held at St. Patrick's Cathedral.

== Politics ==
Welch identified politically as a Republican. He stated that global warming is "the attack on capitalism that socialism couldn't bring", and that it is a form of "mass neurosis". However, Welch additionally said that every business must embrace green products and green ways of doing business, "whether you believe in global warming or not ... because the world wants these products".

Regarding shareholder value, Welch said in a Financial Times interview on the 2008 financial crisis, "On the face of it, shareholder value is the dumbest idea in the world. Shareholder value is a result, not a strategy...your main constituencies are your employees, your customers and your products."

Welch was widely criticized for his views on the employment data in the Bureau of Labor Statistics's September 2012 jobs report. After the release of the report stating that the U.S. unemployment rate had dropped from 8.1% to 7.8%, Welch tweeted, "Unbelievable jobs numbers ... these Chicago guys will do anything ... can't debate so change numbers". Welch stood by his tweet, stating if he could write it again, he would add question marks at the end to make it clear that his intention was to raise a question over the legitimacy of the numbers. A subsequent New York Post article on the employment data suggested manipulation of some of the survey responses by an individual employee in 2010, but that article was widely debunked, including the fact that the employee had not worked at the Bureau since 2011. No proof of the political manipulation of the job numbers from September 2012 has been presented. The Census Bureau later released a statement denying the possibility of systematic manipulation of the data. Still, in an opinion piece in The Wall Street Journal, Welch wrote that the debate led to people looking at unemployment data more carefully and skeptically. Referencing his original tweet, he stated "Thank God I did", in a Squawk Box appearance, and also wrote, "The coming election is too important to be decided on a number. Especially when that number seems so wrong".

== Legacy ==
Welch also often received criticism for a lack of compassion for the middle class and working class. When asked about excessive CEO pay compared to ordinary workers (including backdating stock options, golden parachutes for nonperformance, and extravagant retirement packages), Welch labeled such allegations "outrageous" and vehemently opposed proposed SEC regulations affecting executive compensation. Countering the public uproar, Welch declared that CEO compensation should continue to be dictated by the "free market", without interference from government or other outside parties.

Welch has been described as "perhaps the most celebrated American boss of recent decades". Yet by Wall Street measures, a $100,000 investment in GE shares in the year 2000 (near the end of Welch's tenure) had lost about 80 percent of its value as of the year 2021.

Despite this trend, in a 2015 article in Harvard Business Review, business consultant Ron Ashkenas argues that "Jack Welch's approach to breaking down silos still works", citing examples of engineering companies who have discovered for themselves that "fragmented, geographically dispersed" patterns of organization make it "very difficult ... to coordinate efforts across functions, keep everyone focused on the cost and delivery goals and get people to reach consensus".

Welch has been criticized for practices that have harmed workers and the company: he eliminated thousands of jobs at GE, contributing to a reduction of the U.S. manufacturing base. He eliminated 10% of employees every year, a practice adopted by many other companies. He was a leading proponent of mergers and acquisitions, helping to give rise to an economy that is more concentrated and less dynamic. He pioneered "financialization", changing GE from a manufacturing company into, effectively, an unregulated bank, which harmed GE over the long term.

As of late 2021, General Electric planned to break into three public companies and effectively cease to exist. The companies would separately operate in the aviation, health care and energy markets. As of 2021, GE was headed by H. Lawrence Culp Jr. who was named in 2018 as its fourth CEO since Welch's departure. Several of Welch's acolytes had ultimately unsuccessful careers at other companies: Jim McNerney, Dennis Muilenburg, and David Calhoun ruined Boeing’s reputation because of the Boeing 737 MAX and Boeing 787 Dreamliner scandals. Robert Nardelli caused widespread customer dissatisfaction at Home Depot by using part-time non-experts. After being dismissed by Home Depot, Nardelli presided over the bankruptcy of Chrysler.

=== Wider impact ===
Welch's practices and legacy were criticized as a bad influence on corporate America and ultimately self-destructive for GE and the U.S. economy by author David Gelles in his 2022 book The Man Who Broke Capitalism: How Jack Welch Gutted the Heartland and Crushed the Soul of Corporate America―and How to Undo His Legacy.

== Popular culture ==
On March 11, 2010, Welch cameoed as himself in the NBC sitcom 30 Rock, appearing in the season four episode "Future Husband". In the episode, Welch confronts Alec Baldwin's character, Jack Donaghy, to confirm the sale of NBC Universal to a fictional Philadelphia-based cable company called Kabletown. The sale is a satirical reference to the real-world acquisition of NBCUniversal from General Electric by Comcast in November 2009.

== Works ==
- Welch, Jack and John A. Byrne. Jack: Straight from the Gut. New York: Warner Business Books, 2001. ISBN 0-446-69068-6
- Welch, Jack and Suzy Welch. Winning. HarperCollins, 2005. ISBN 0-06-075394-3
- Welch, Jack and Suzy Welch. Winning: The Answers. Harper, 2006. ISBN 0-00-725264-1

== See also ==
- Shareholder primacy
- Shareholder value, 1981 speech at The Pierre hotel
- Vitality curve

Business positions
Preceded by Reginald H. Jones	Chairman & CEO of General Electric; 1981–2001	Succeeded by Jeff Immelt
