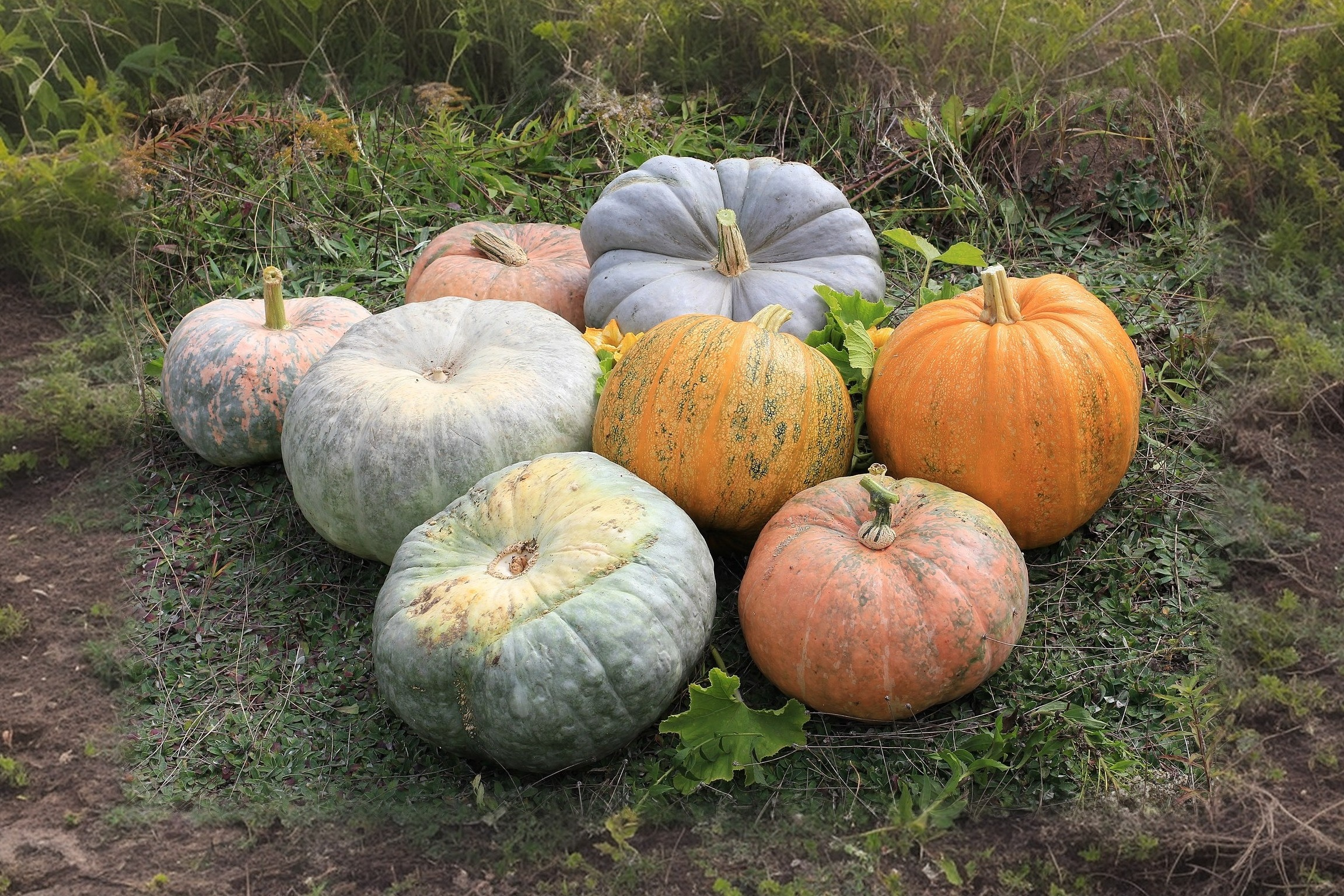
- Cucurbita fruits

Scientific classification
- Kingdom: Plantae
- Clade: Tracheophytes
- Clade: Angiosperms
- Clade: Eudicots
- Clade: Rosids
- Order: Cucurbitales
- Family: Cucurbitaceae
- Subfamily: Cucurbitoideae
- Tribe: Cucurbiteae

Genera
- 13, see text

= Cucurbiteae =

Tribe of flowering plants

The Cucurbiteae are a tribe of the subfamily Cucurbitoideae, which is part of the flowering plant family Cucurbitaceae (gourds). Species are usually monoecious herbaceous annuals or woody lianas.

The tribe consists of 13 genera reported, but a 2011 study based on genetics reported 11. Members of the genus Cucurbita produce economically valuable fruits, namely squashes and pumpkins.

== Genera ==
The genera are:

- Abobra – cranberry gourd
- Calycophysum
- Cayaponia, the largest of these genera
- Cionosicys
- Cucurbita – squashes and pumpkins
- Penelopeia (synonym Anacaona)
- Peponopsis
- Polyclathra
- Schizocarpum
- Selysia
- Sicana – cassabananas
- Tecunumania
