= Indofevillea =

Scientific classification
- Kingdom: Plantae
- Clade: Embryophytes
- Clade: Tracheophytes
- Clade: Angiosperms
- Clade: Eudicots
- Clade: Rosids
- Order: Cucurbitales
- Family: Cucurbitaceae
- Genus: Indofevillea; Chatterjee

Genus of plants

Indofevillea is a genus of flowering plants belonging to the family Cucurbitaceae.

Its native range is Eastern Himalayas, Assam, to Tibet and Myanmar.

The genus name of Indofevillea is in honour of Louis Feuillée (1660–1732), a French member of the Order of the Minims, explorer, astronomer, geographer, and botanist. It was first described and published by Debabarta Chatterjee in 1946.

Known species, according to Kew;

- Indofevillea jiroi H.Schaef., B.M.Barthol. & Boufford
- Indofevillea khasiana Chatterjee
