= Cucurbitella =

Cucurbitella may refer to the following:

- Cucurbitella (plant), a genus of flowering plants
- Cucurbitella (amoeba), a genus of amoebae
