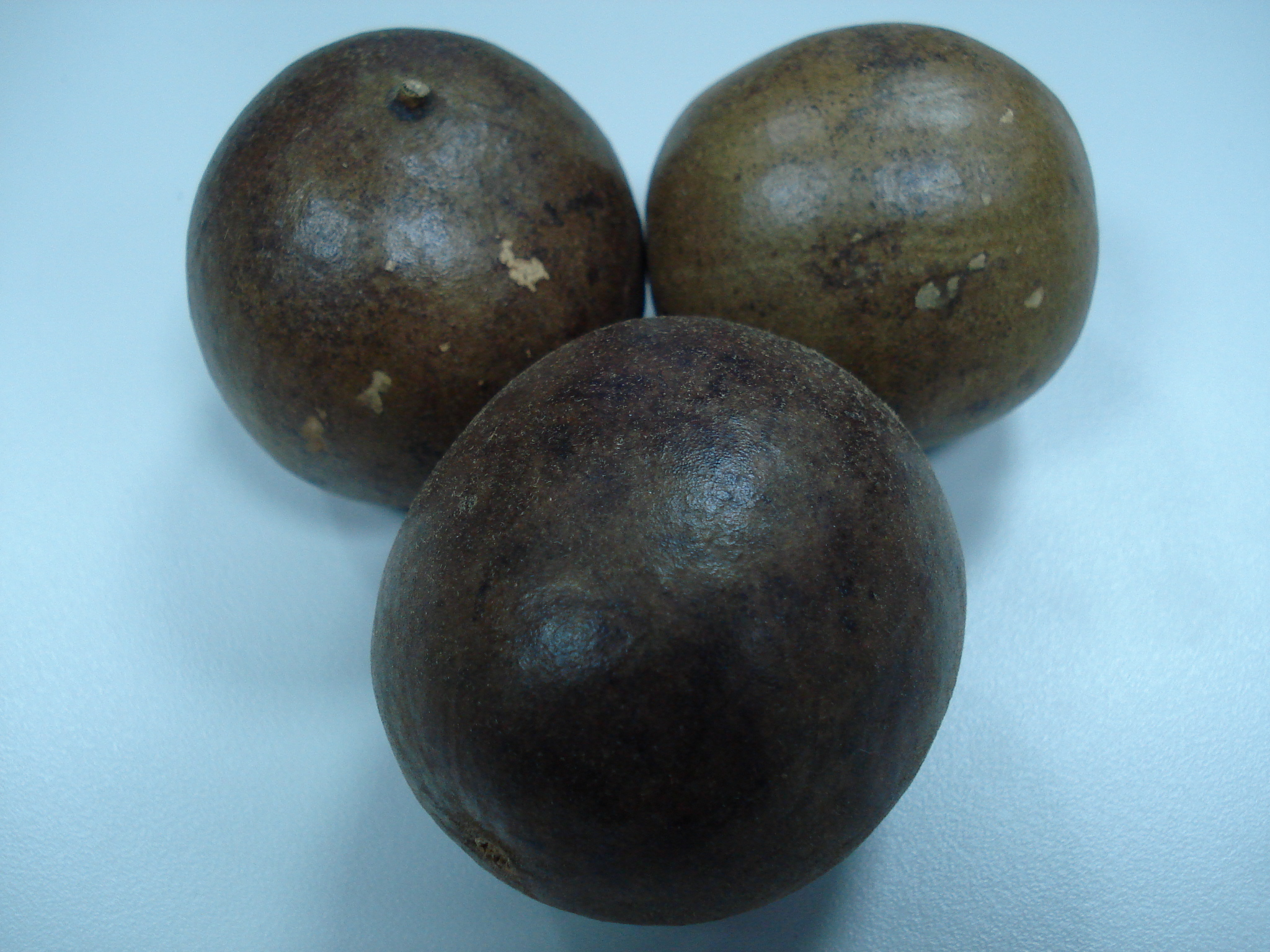
- Siraitia grosvenorii (luohan guo) fruits

Scientific classification
- Kingdom: Plantae
- Clade: Tracheophytes
- Clade: Angiosperms
- Clade: Eudicots
- Clade: Rosids
- Order: Cucurbitales
- Family: Cucurbitaceae
- Subfamily: Cucurbitoideae
- Tribe: Siraitieae; H. Schaef. & S.S. Renner 2011
- Genus: Siraitia; Merr.

Synonyms
- Neoluffa Chakrav.

= Siraitia =

Genus of flowering plants

Siraitia is a genus of plants from the family Cucurbitaceae. The following species have been assigned to it, at various times:

- Siraitia africana, see Microlagenaria africana
- Siraitia borneensis, see Baijiania borneensis, from Borneo.
- Siraitia grosvenorii (luo han guo, monk's fruit), from China and Thailand
- Siraitia siamensis, from Thailand
- Siraitia sikkimensis, from India
- Siraitia silomaradjae, from India
- Siraitia taiwaniana, from Taiwan, see Sinobaijiania taiwaniana
