= Hanburia =

Hanburia may refer to:

- Hanburia (plant), a genus of plants in the family Cucurbitaceae
- Hanburia (trilobite), a genus of trilobites in the order Corynexochida
