= Bolbostemma =

Scientific classification
- Kingdom: Plantae
- Clade: Embryophytes
- Clade: Tracheophytes
- Clade: Angiosperms
- Clade: Eudicots
- Clade: Rosids
- Order: Cucurbitales
- Family: Cucurbitaceae
- Tribe: Actinostemmateae
- Genus: Bolbostemma; Franquet

Genus of flowering plants

Bolbostemma is a genus of flowering plants belonging to the family Cucurbitaceae.

Its native range is Southern Central China.

Species:

- Bolbostemma biglandulosum (Hemsl.) Franquet
- Bolbostemma paniculatum (Maxim.) Franquet
