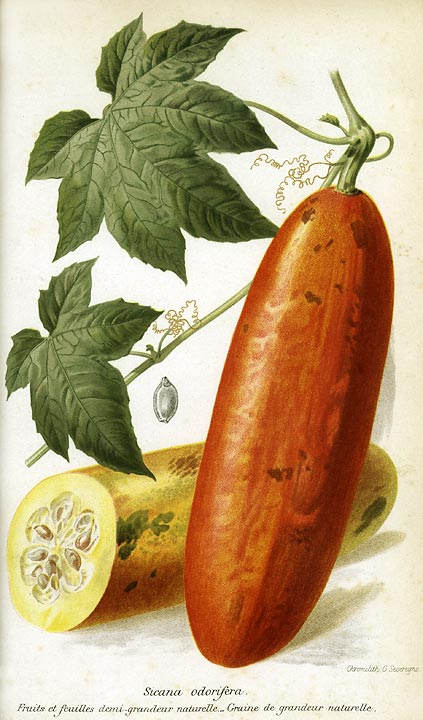

Scientific classification
- Kingdom: Plantae
- Clade: Tracheophytes
- Clade: Angiosperms
- Clade: Eudicots
- Clade: Rosids
- Order: Cucurbitales
- Family: Cucurbitaceae
- Genus: Sicana
- Species: S. odorifera

Binomial name
- Sicana odorifera (Vell.) Naudin

Synonyms
- Cucurbita evodicarpa Hassk.; Cucurbita odorifera Vell.

= Sicana odorifera =

Cassabanana

Species of plant

Sicana odorifera is a fast-growing, tropical herbaceous perennial vine in the gourd family, native to tropical South America and prized for its large, cylindrical fruits that can reach two feet in length. English names include cassabanana or casbanan, sikana, puttigel and musk cucumber.

Grown as an ornamental plant and for its sweet edible fruit, the vigorous, fleshy vine can reach up to 50 feet (or 15 meters) in height, climbing with four-part adhesive tendrils with suction-cup discs to climb surfaces, including trees and buildings. The large, hairy, palmately lobed leaves grow to 30 cm (12 in) in width.

The fruit is long and cylindrical, similar to a giant hot dog or oversized cucumber, reaching 12 to 24 inches (or 60 cm) in length. Despite its name, it is a relative of melons and squash, featuring a tough, waxy rind that turns shades of deep purple, maroon, or orange when mature. It is most famous for its intense, melon-like taste when ripe and requires high temperatures to ripen.

The sweet, aromatic, yellow-to-orange flesh of the mature fruit is eaten raw or made into preserves. The immature fruit can be cooked as a vegetable.

Its fragrance is so potent that it's often used as a natural air freshener or moth repellent in homes and linen closets.

== Cultivation ==
It is propagated by seeds. It is grown widely in the warm parts of Latin America, as well as by the Cajun people of the Southern United States. It needs good drainage to grow well, and does well on an acidic mix of sand (or perlite) and rich compost.
