= Anacaona (disambiguation) =

Anacaona was a Taíno queen.

Anacaona may also refer to:

- Anacaona (band), a Cuban band
- Anacaona (insect), a genus of coneheads in the tribe Copiphorini
- Anacaona (plant), a genus of plants described in 1980 and subsequently synonymised with Penelopeia
