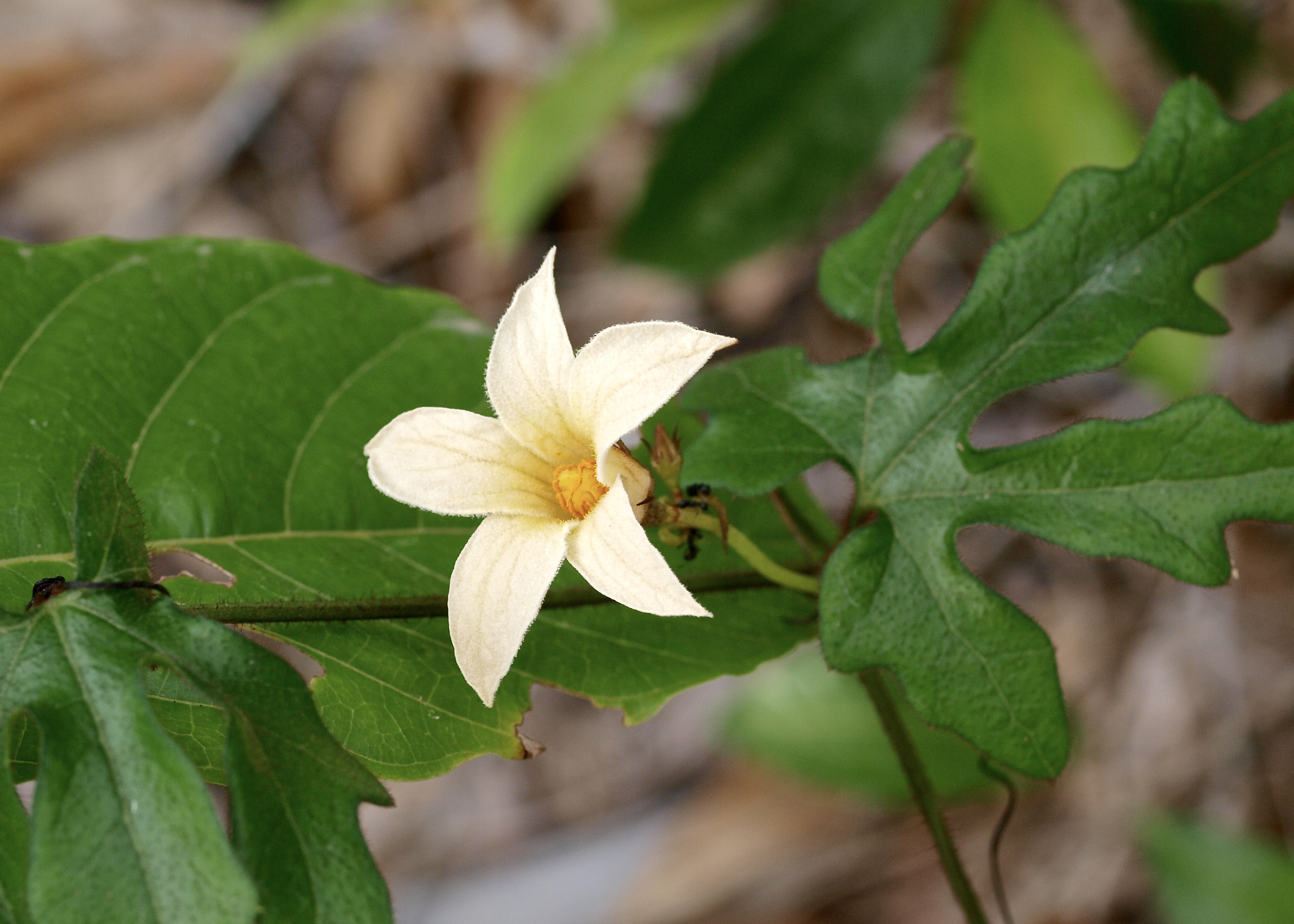
- Ruthalicia eglandulosa from Ivory Coast
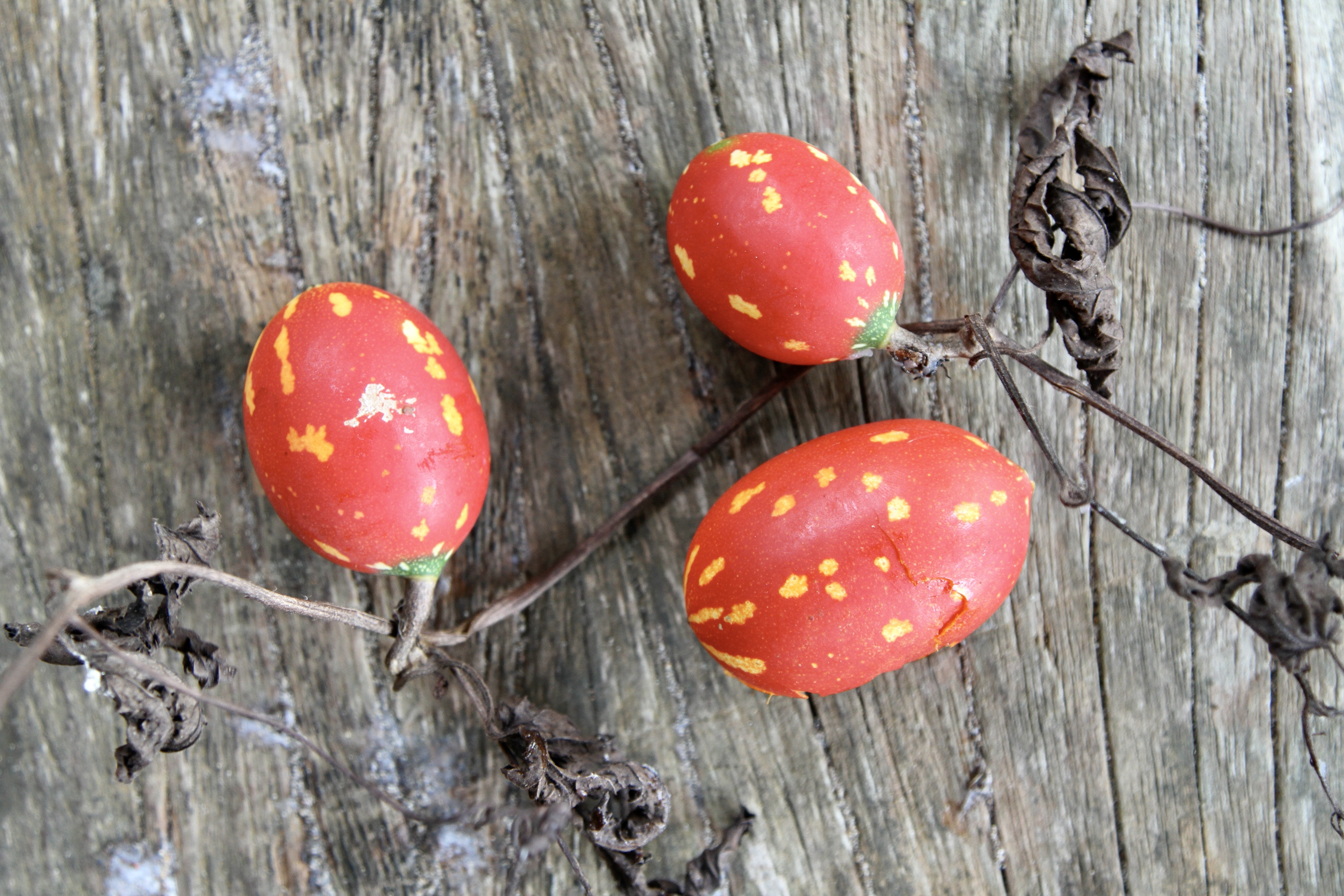
- Ruthalicia eglandulosa fruit from Ivory Coast

Scientific classification
- Kingdom: Plantae
- Clade: Embryophytes
- Clade: Tracheophytes
- Clade: Angiosperms
- Clade: Eudicots
- Clade: Rosids
- Order: Cucurbitales
- Family: Cucurbitaceae
- Genus: Ruthalicia; C.Jeffrey

= Ruthalicia =

Genus of plants

Ruthalicia is a genus of flowering plants belonging to the family Cucurbitaceae.

Its native range is Western and Western Central Tropical Africa.

Species:

- Ruthalicia eglandulosa (Hook.f.) C.Jeffrey
- Ruthalicia longipes (Hook.f.) C.Jeffrey
