= Ampelosicyos =

Scientific classification
- Kingdom: Plantae
- Clade: Embryophytes
- Clade: Tracheophytes
- Clade: Angiosperms
- Clade: Eudicots
- Clade: Rosids
- Order: Cucurbitales
- Family: Cucurbitaceae
- Genus: Ampelosicyos; Thouars

Synonyms
- Delognaea Cogn.; Odosicyos Keraudren; Tricyclandra Keraudren

Genus of flowering plants

Ampelosicyos is a genus of flowering plants belonging to the family Cucurbitaceae.

It is native to Madagascar.

The genus name of Ampelosicyos is in honour of Ampelos, who was the personification of the grapevine and lover of Dionysus in Greek and Roman mythology. It was first described and published in Hist. Vég. Îsles Austral. Afriq. on page 68 in 1808.

== Species known ==
As accepted by Plants of the World Online:

- Ampelosicyos bosseri (Keraudren) H.Schaef. & S.S.Renner
- Ampelosicyos humblotii (Cogn.) Jum. & H.Perrier
- Ampelosicyos leandrii (Keraudren) H.Schaef. & S.S.Renner
- Ampelosicyos major Jum. & H.Perrier
- Ampelosicyos meridionalis Keraudren
- Ampelosicyos scandens Thouars
