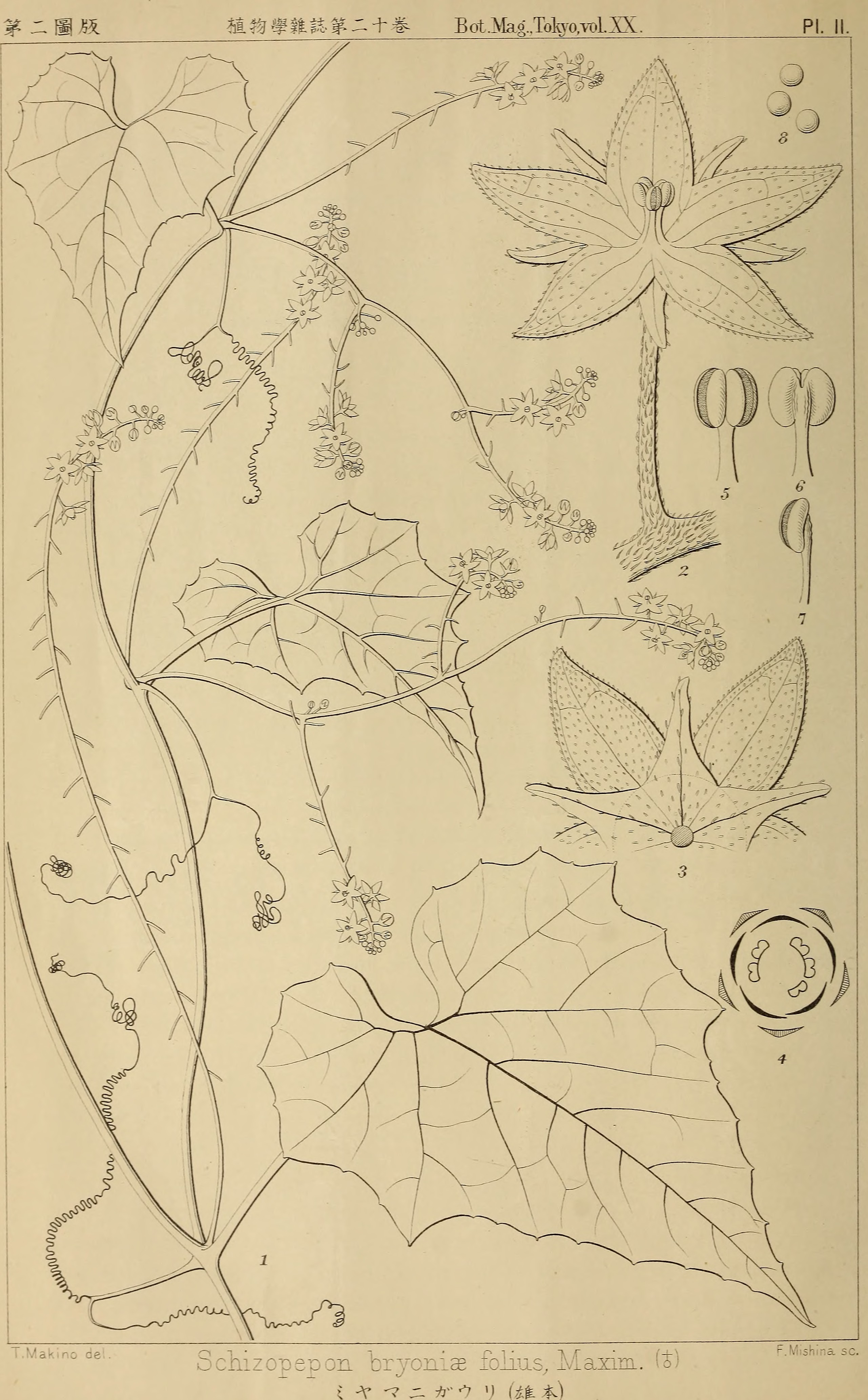
- The botanical magazine = Shokubutsugaku zasshi (1906)

Scientific classification
- Kingdom: Plantae
- Clade: Embryophytes
- Clade: Tracheophytes
- Clade: Angiosperms
- Clade: Eudicots
- Clade: Rosids
- Order: Cucurbitales
- Family: Cucurbitaceae
- Genus: Schizopepon; Maxim.

= Schizopepon =

Genus of plants

Schizopepon is a genus of flowering plants belonging to the family Cucurbitaceae.

Its native range is Eastern Himalaya to Russian Far East and Japan.

Species:

- Schizopepon bicirrhosus (C.B.Clarke) C.Jeffrey
- Schizopepon bomiensis A.M.Lu & Zhi Y.Zhang
- Schizopepon bryoniifolius Maxim.
- Schizopepon dioicus Cogn.
- Schizopepon longipes Gagnep.
- Schizopepon macranthus Hand.-Mazz.
- Schizopepon monoicus A.M.Lu & Zhi Y.Zhang
- Schizopepon xizangensis A.M.Lu & Zhi Y.Zhang
