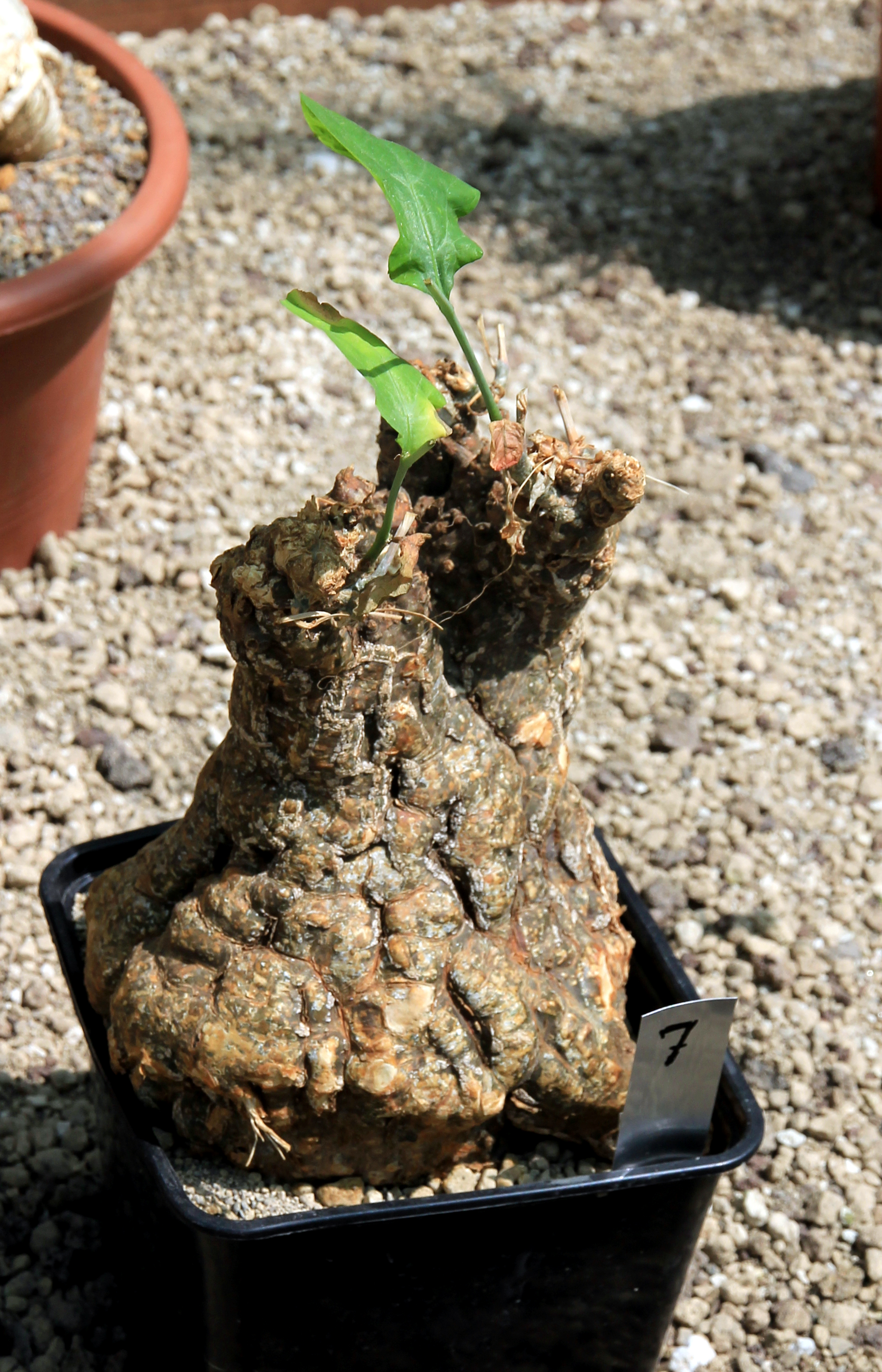
- Cephalopentandra ecirrhosa

Scientific classification
- Kingdom: Plantae
- Clade: Embryophytes
- Clade: Tracheophytes
- Clade: Angiosperms
- Clade: Eudicots
- Clade: Rosids
- Order: Cucurbitales
- Family: Cucurbitaceae
- Genus: Cephalopentandra; Chiov.

= Cephalopentandra =

Genus of flowering plants

Cephalopentandra is a genus of flowering plants belonging to the family Cucurbitaceae.

Its native range is Northeastern Tropical Africa.

Species:

- Cephalopentandra ecirrhosa (Cogn.) C.Jeffrey
