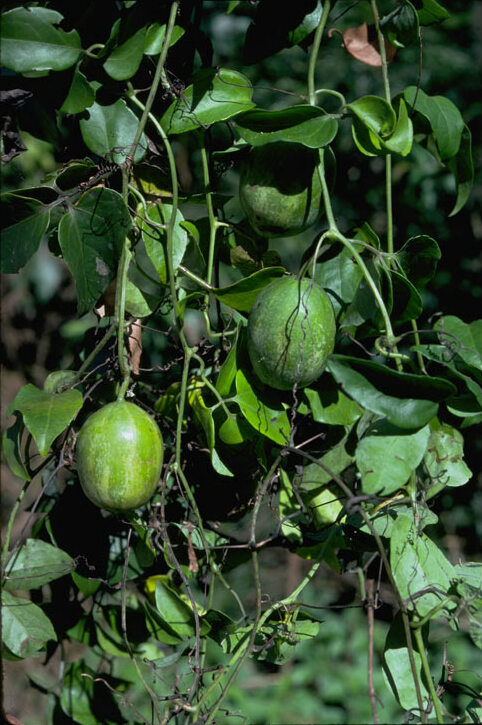

Scientific classification
- Kingdom: Plantae
- Clade: Embryophytes
- Clade: Tracheophytes
- Clade: Spermatophytes
- Clade: Angiosperms
- Clade: Eudicots
- Clade: Rosids
- Order: Cucurbitales
- Family: Cucurbitaceae
- Subfamily: Cucurbitoideae
- Tribe: Sicyoeae
- Genus: Nothoalsomitra; I.Telford
- Species: N. suberosa

Binomial name
- Nothoalsomitra suberosa (F.M.Bailey) I.Telford

Synonyms
- Alsomitra suberosa F.M.Bailey; Neoalsomitra suberosa (F.M.Bailey) Hutch.

= Nothoalsomitra =

Genus of flowering plants

Nothoalsomitra suberosa is a species of subtropical vines in the family Cucurbitaceae, the only member of the monotypic genus Nothoalsomitra. Native to Queensland in Australia.

The species is a vigorous climber with pale corky bark and leaves divided into three triangular leaflets. Flowers have a yellow corolla with five petals. Fruits are a green and ovoid with numerous seeds.

N. suberosa is listed as rare and is restricted to wet sclerophyll forest and sub-tropical rainforest in the D'Aguilar Range, Blackall Range and Conondale ranges north of Brisbane.

This plant was once placed in the related genus Neoalsomitra.

It was first described and published in Fl. Australia Vol.8 on page 388 in 1982.
