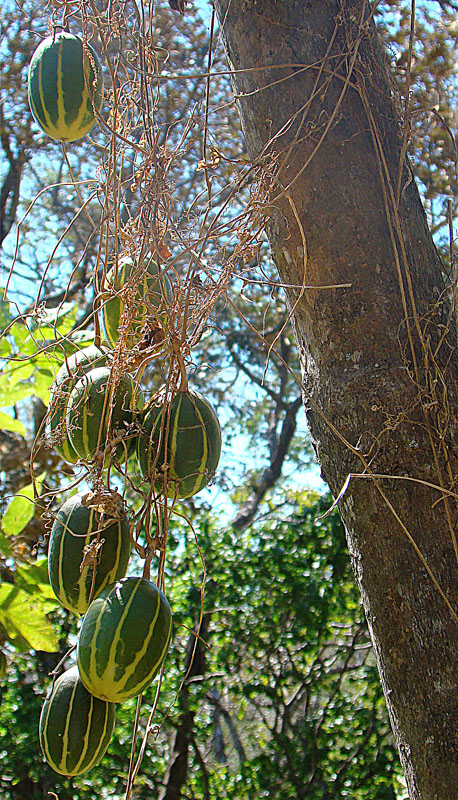
- Polyclathra cucumerina fruit and plant

Scientific classification
- Kingdom: Plantae
- Clade: Tracheophytes
- Clade: Angiosperms
- Clade: Eudicots
- Clade: Rosids
- Order: Cucurbitales
- Family: Cucurbitaceae
- Subfamily: Cucurbitoideae
- Tribe: Cucurbiteae
- Genus: Polyclathra; Bertol.

Species
- See text

= Polyclathra =

Genus of plants

Polyclathra is a genus of the gourd family. It has the synonyms Pentaclathra, Pittiera, and Roseanthus. Its corolla is white.

== Species ==
- Polyclathra albiflora
- Polyclathra cucumerina Bertol.
- Polyclathra grandiflora
- Polyclathra longipedunculata
