= Cyclantheropsis =

Scientific classification
- Kingdom: Plantae
- Clade: Embryophytes
- Clade: Tracheophytes
- Clade: Angiosperms
- Clade: Eudicots
- Clade: Rosids
- Order: Cucurbitales
- Family: Cucurbitaceae
- Genus: Cyclantheropsis; Harms

Genus of flowering plants

Cyclantheropsis is a genus of flowering plants belonging to the family Cucurbitaceae.

Its native range is Tropical Africa, Madagascar.

Species:

- Cyclantheropsis madagascariensis Keraudren
- Cyclantheropsis occidentalis Gilg & Mildbr.
- Cyclantheropsis parviflora (Cogn.) Harms
