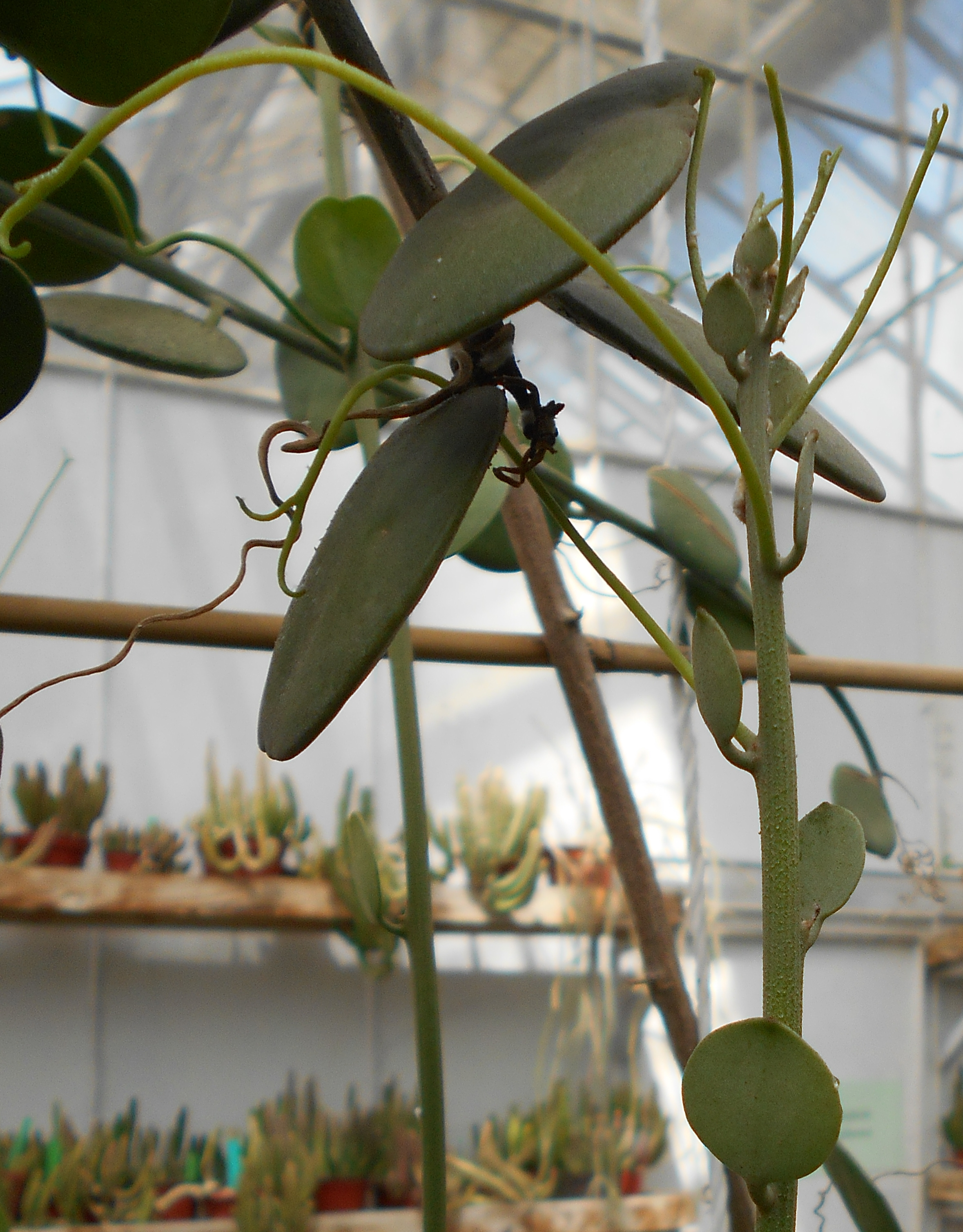
- Silver dollar plant (Xerosicyos danguyi)

Scientific classification
- Kingdom: Plantae
- Clade: Embryophytes
- Clade: Tracheophytes
- Clade: Angiosperms
- Clade: Eudicots
- Clade: Rosids
- Order: Cucurbitales
- Family: Cucurbitaceae
- Tribe: Zanonieae
- Genus: Xerosicyos; Humbert

Species
- Xerosicyos danguyi Humbert; Xerosicyos decaryi Guillaumin & Keraudren; Xerosicyos hirtellus (Humbert) H.Schaef. & S.S.Renner; Xerosicyos perrieri Humbert; Xerosicyos pubescens Keraudren; Xerosicyos tripartitus (Humbert) H.Schaef. & S.S.Renner

Synonyms
- Zygosicyos Humbert

= Xerosicyos =

Genus of flowering plants

Xerosicyos is a flowering plant genus of the family Cucurbitaceae. Its name comes from Greek xeros (meaning "dry") and sicyos ("cucumber"). There are six species, all endemic to Madagascar.

== Species ==
Six species are accepted.

- Xerosicyos danguyi Humbert is a large liana with thick stems and round, gray succulent leaves. It is common in cultivation and often called the "silver dollar" vine.
- Xerosicyos decaryi Guillaumin & Keraudren
- Xerosicyos hirtellus (Humbert) H.Schaef. & S.S.Renner
- Xerosicyos perrieri Humbert is also a liana with thinner stems and smaller, ovate green succulent leaves.
- Xerosicyos pubescens Keraudren is entirely different from the previous species. It forms a large caudex from which deciduous vines emerge. The leaves are lobed and semi-succulent and die back in the dry season and during prolonged periods of drought.
- Xerosicyos tripartitus (Humbert) H.Schaef. & S.S.Renner
