= Sicydium (plant) =

Scientific classification
- Kingdom: Plantae
- Clade: Embryophytes
- Clade: Tracheophytes
- Clade: Angiosperms
- Clade: Eudicots
- Clade: Rosids
- Order: Cucurbitales
- Family: Cucurbitaceae
- Tribe: Triceratieae
- Genus: Sicydium; Schltdl. (1832)

Species
- 9; see text

Synonyms
- Chalema Dieterle (1980); Triceratia A.Rich. (1846)

Genus of flowering plants

Sicydium is a genus of flowering plants in the cucumber family, Cucurbitaceae. It includes nine species native to the tropical Americas, ranging from Mexico to northeastern Argentina.

== Species ==
Nine species are accepted.

- Sicydium araguense Steyerm. & Trujillo
- Sicydium davilae Lira
- Sicydium diffusum Cogn.
- Sicydium gracile Cogn.
- Sicydium nereoi Pozner
- Sicydium schiedeanum Schltdl.
- Sicydium synantherum (Dieterle) H.Schaef. & S.S.Renner
- Sicydium tamnifolium (Kunth) Cogn.
- Sicydium tuerckheimii Donn.Sm.
