= Indomelothria =

Scientific classification
- Kingdom: Plantae
- Clade: Embryophytes
- Clade: Tracheophytes
- Clade: Angiosperms
- Clade: Eudicots
- Clade: Rosids
- Order: Cucurbitales
- Family: Cucurbitaceae
- Genus: Indomelothria; W.J.de Wilde & Duyfjes

Genus of plants

Indomelothria is a genus of flowering plants belonging to the family Cucurbitaceae.

Its native range is Indo-China to Western Malesia.

Species:

- Indomelothria blumei (Ser.) W.J.de Wilde & Duyfjes
- Indomelothria chlorocarpa W.J.de Wilde & Duyfjes
