= Microsechium =

Scientific classification
- Kingdom: Plantae
- Clade: Embryophytes
- Clade: Tracheophytes
- Clade: Angiosperms
- Clade: Eudicots
- Clade: Rosids
- Order: Cucurbitales
- Family: Cucurbitaceae
- Genus: Microsechium; Naudin

Genus of plants

Microsechium is a genus of flowering plants belonging to the family Cucurbitaceae.

Its native range is Mexico to Central America.

Species:

- Microsechium compositum Donn.Sm.
- Microsechium gonzalo-palomae Lira
- Microsechium hintonii Paul G.Wilson
- Microsechium palmatum (Ser.) Cogn.
