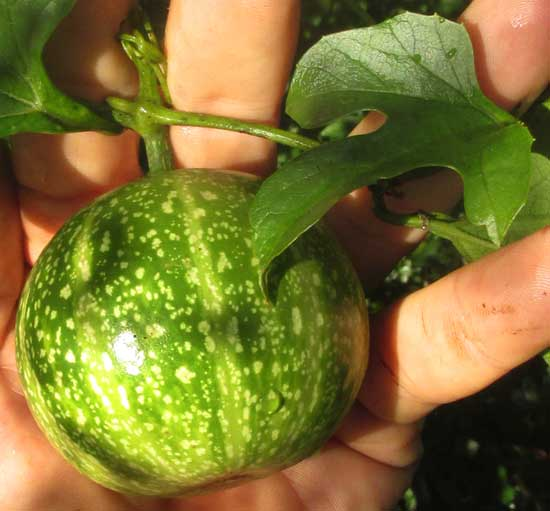
- Cionosicys excisus immature fruit and 3-lobed leaf

Scientific classification
- Kingdom: Plantae
- Clade: Embryophytes
- Clade: Tracheophytes
- Clade: Spermatophytes
- Clade: Angiosperms
- Clade: Eudicots
- Clade: Rosids
- Order: Cucurbitales
- Family: Cucurbitaceae
- Subfamily: Cucurbitoideae
- Tribe: Cucurbiteae
- Genus: Cionosicys; Griseb.

Species
- See text

Synonyms
- Cionosicyos Benth. & Hook. f. 1867; Cionosicyos Griseb. 1864 [1860]

= Cionosicys =

Genus of flowering plants

Cionosicys is a genus of the gourd family.

== Species ==
- Cionosicys excisus (Griseb.) C.Jeffrey
- Cionosicys macranthus (Pittier) C.Jeffrey
- Cionosicys pomiformis Griseb.
