= Lemurosicyos =

Scientific classification
- Kingdom: Plantae
- Clade: Embryophytes
- Clade: Tracheophytes
- Clade: Angiosperms
- Clade: Eudicots
- Clade: Rosids
- Order: Cucurbitales
- Family: Cucurbitaceae
- Genus: Lemurosicyos; Keraudren
- Species: L. variegatus

Binomial name
- Lemurosicyos variegatus (Cogn.) Keraudren

Synonyms
- Luffa variegata Cogn.

Genus of plants

Lemurosicyos is a monotypic genus of flowering plants belonging to the family Cucurbitaceae. The only species is Lemurosicyos variegatus.

Its native range is Madagascar.
