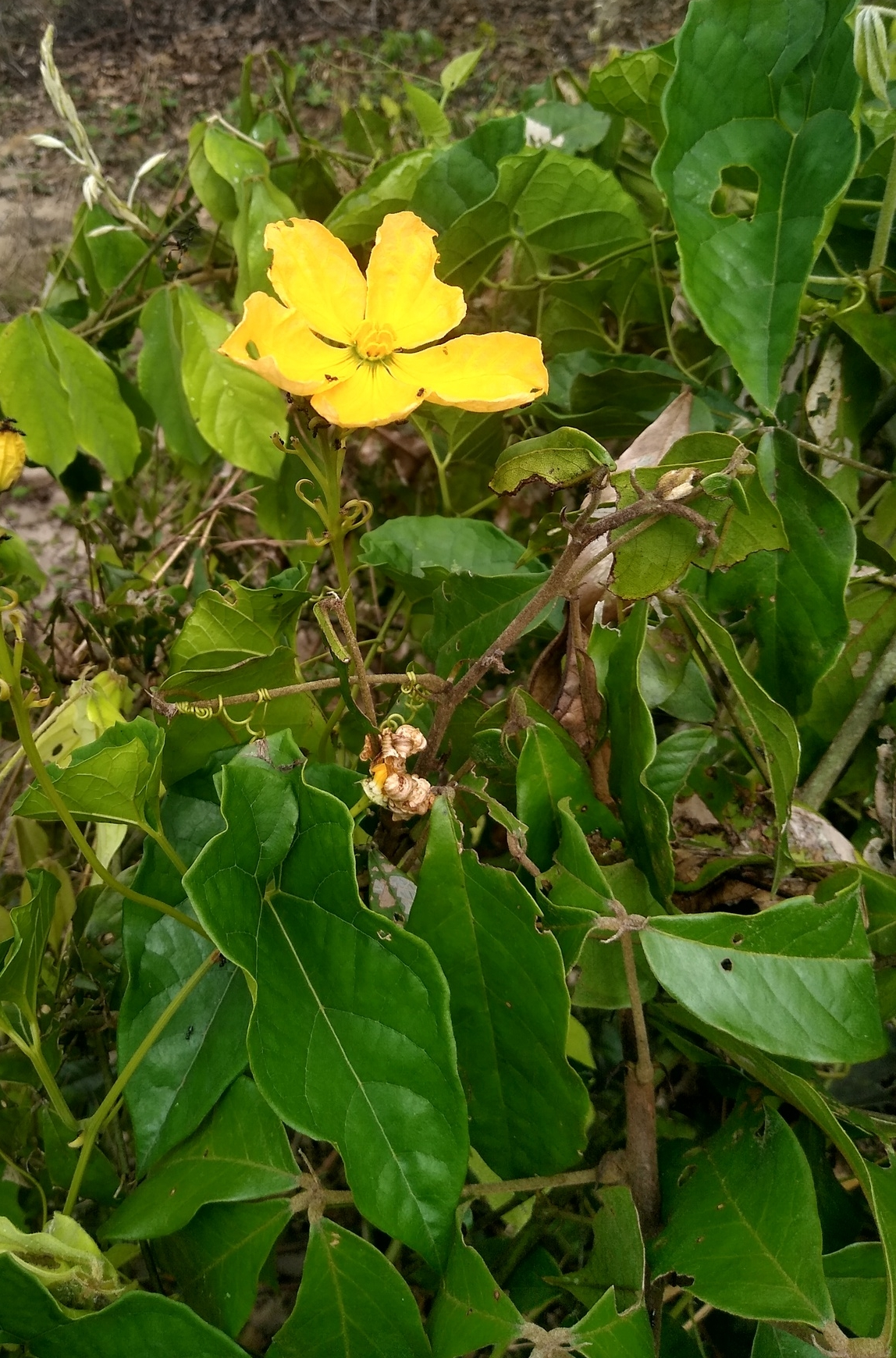
- Cogniauxia podolaena in Gabon.

Scientific classification
- Kingdom: Plantae
- Clade: Embryophytes
- Clade: Tracheophytes
- Clade: Angiosperms
- Clade: Eudicots
- Clade: Rosids
- Order: Cucurbitales
- Family: Cucurbitaceae
- Genus: Cogniauxia; Baill.

= Cogniauxia =

Genus of flowering plants

Cogniauxia is a genus of flowering plants belonging to the family Cucurbitaceae.

Its native range is Western Central Tropical Africa to Angola.

Species:

- Cogniauxia podolaena Baill.
- Cogniauxia trilobata Cogn.
