= Baijiania =

Scientific classification
- Kingdom: Plantae
- Clade: Embryophytes
- Clade: Tracheophytes
- Clade: Angiosperms
- Clade: Eudicots
- Clade: Rosids
- Order: Cucurbitales
- Family: Cucurbitaceae
- Genus: Baijiania; A.M.Lu & J.Q.Li

Genus of flowering plants

Baijiania is a genus of flowering plants belonging to the family Cucurbitaceae. "These plants are woody climbers with dioecious flowers, being up to 6 meters long with small or large spherical tubers. These tubers are often exposed." There are five possible species in this genus, but only one is currently accepted.

Its native range is Borneo.

Species:

- Baijiania borneensis (Merr.) A.M.Lu & J.Q.Li
