= Siolmatra =

Scientific classification
- Kingdom: Plantae
- Clade: Embryophytes
- Clade: Tracheophytes
- Clade: Angiosperms
- Clade: Eudicots
- Clade: Rosids
- Order: Cucurbitales
- Family: Cucurbitaceae
- Genus: Siolmatra; Baill.

Genus of plants

Siolmatra is a genus of flowering plants belonging to the family Cucurbitaceae.

Its native range is Southern Tropical America.

== Species ==
Species:

- Siolmatra brasiliensis (Cogn.) Baill.
- Siolmatra pentaphylla Harms
