= Bambekea =

Scientific classification
- Kingdom: Plantae
- Clade: Embryophytes
- Clade: Tracheophytes
- Clade: Angiosperms
- Clade: Eudicots
- Clade: Rosids
- Order: Cucurbitales
- Family: Cucurbitaceae
- Genus: Bambekea; Cogn.

Genus of flowering plants

Bambekea is a genus of flowering plants belonging to the family Cucurbitaceae. The genus name honours the Belgian physician and naturalist Charles Eugène Marie Van Bambeke.

Its native range is Western and Western Central Tropical Africa.

Species:

- Bambekea racemosa Cogn.
