= Borneosicyos =

Scientific classification
- Kingdom: Plantae
- Clade: Embryophytes
- Clade: Tracheophytes
- Clade: Angiosperms
- Clade: Eudicots
- Clade: Rosids
- Order: Cucurbitales
- Family: Cucurbitaceae
- Genus: Borneosicyos; W.J.de Wilde

Genus of flowering plants

Borneosicyos is a genus of flowering plants belonging to the family Cucurbitaceae.

Its native range is Borneo.

Species:

- Borneosicyos simplex W.J.de Wilde
