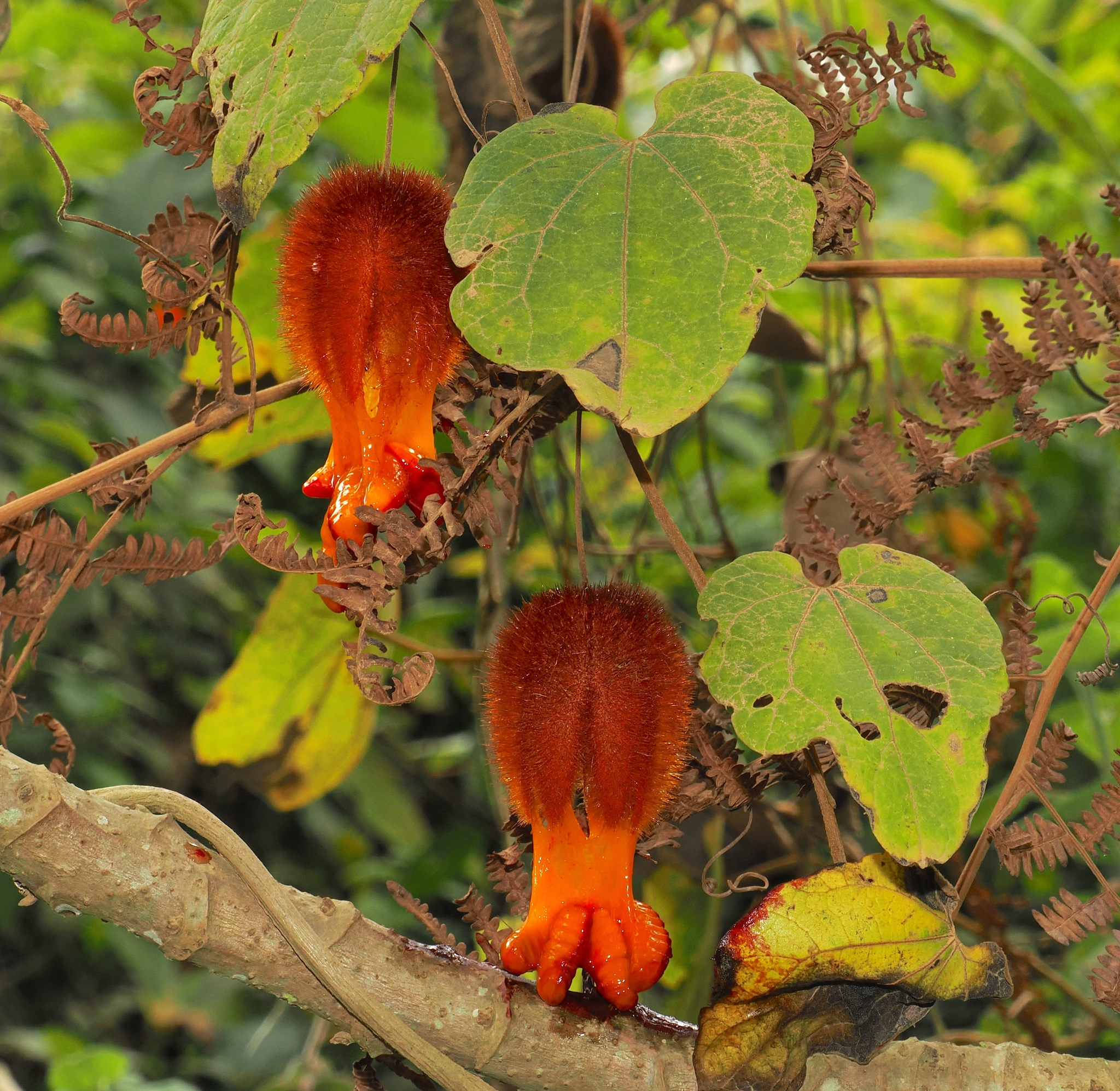
- Raphidiocystis chrysocoma in Tanzania

Scientific classification
- Kingdom: Plantae
- Clade: Embryophytes
- Clade: Tracheophytes
- Clade: Angiosperms
- Clade: Eudicots
- Clade: Rosids
- Order: Cucurbitales
- Family: Cucurbitaceae
- Genus: Raphidiocystis; Hook.f.

= Raphidiocystis =

Genus of plants

Raphidiocystis is a genus of flowering plants belonging to the family Cucurbitaceae.

Its native range is Tropical Africa and Madagascar.

Species:

- Raphidiocystis brachypoda Baker
- Raphidiocystis chrysocoma (Schumach.) C.Jeffrey
- Raphidiocystis jeffreyana R.Fern. & A.Fern.
- Raphidiocystis mannii Hook.f.
- Raphidiocystis phyllocalyx C.Jeffrey & Keraudren
