= Ceratosanthes =

Scientific classification
- Kingdom: Plantae
- Clade: Embryophytes
- Clade: Tracheophytes
- Clade: Angiosperms
- Clade: Eudicots
- Clade: Rosids
- Order: Cucurbitales
- Family: Cucurbitaceae
- Genus: Ceratosanthes; Burm. ex Adans.

Genus of flowering plants

Ceratosanthes is a genus of flowering plants belonging to the family Cucurbitaceae.

Its native range is Tropical America.

Species:

- Ceratosanthes angustiloba Ridl.
- Ceratosanthes cuneata Ridl.
- Ceratosanthes hilariana Cogn.
- Ceratosanthes humilis Cogn.
- Ceratosanthes multiloba Cogn.
- Ceratosanthes palmata (L.) Urb.
- Ceratosanthes parviflora Cogn.
- Ceratosanthes rupicola Ridl.
- Ceratosanthes tomentosa Cogn.
- Ceratosanthes trifoliata Cogn.
- Ceratosanthes warmingii Cogn.
