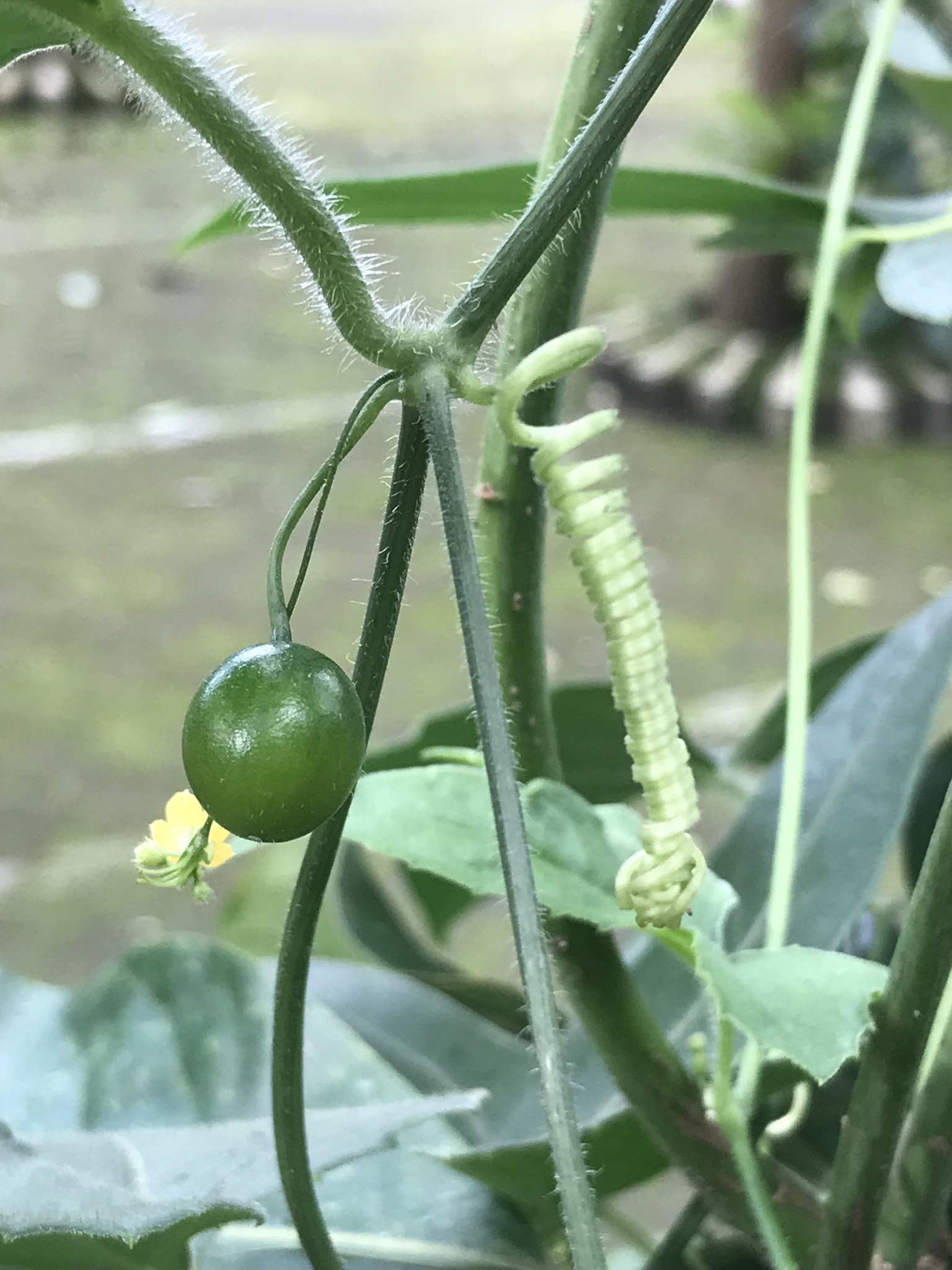
- Scopellaria marginata

Scientific classification
- Kingdom: Plantae
- Clade: Embryophytes
- Clade: Tracheophytes
- Clade: Angiosperms
- Clade: Eudicots
- Clade: Rosids
- Order: Cucurbitales
- Family: Cucurbitaceae
- Genus: Scopellaria; W.J.de Wilde & Duyfjes

= Scopellaria =

Genus of plants

Scopellaria is a genus of flowering plants belonging to the family Cucurbitaceae.

Its native range is southern-central China to western and central Malesia.

== Species ==
The following two species are recognised in the genus Scopellaria:

- Scopellaria diversifolia (Merr.) W.J.de Wilde & Duyfjes
- Scopellaria marginata (Blume) W.J.de Wilde & Duyfjes
