= Trochomeriopsis =

Scientific classification
- Kingdom: Plantae
- Clade: Embryophytes
- Clade: Tracheophytes
- Clade: Angiosperms
- Clade: Eudicots
- Clade: Rosids
- Order: Cucurbitales
- Family: Cucurbitaceae
- Genus: Trochomeriopsis; Cogn.

Genus of flowering plants

Trochomeriopsis is a genus of flowering plants belonging to the family Cucurbitaceae.

Its native range is Madagascar.

Species:

- Trochomeriopsis diversifolia Cogn.
