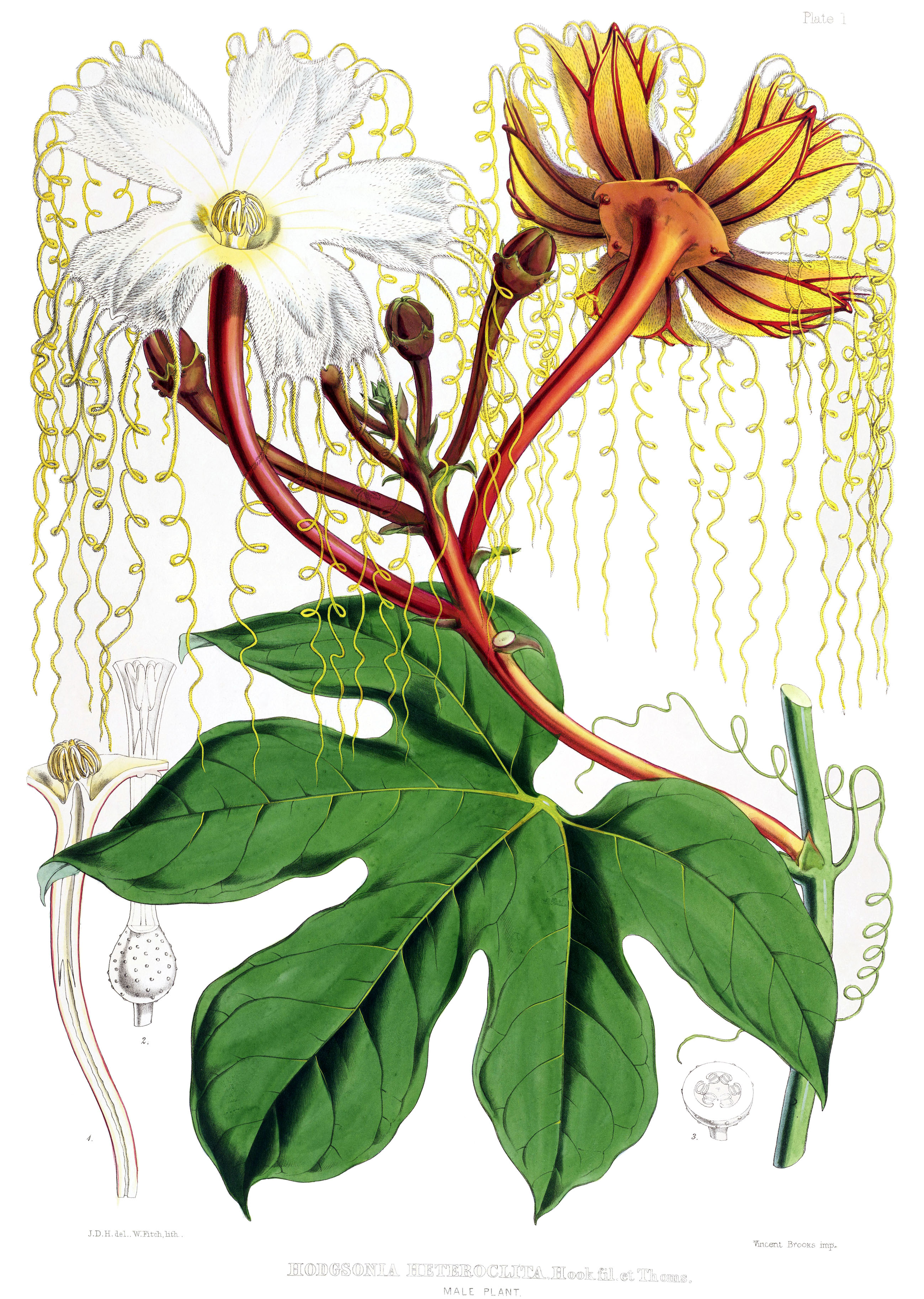
- Hodgsonia heteroclita male plant

Scientific classification
- Kingdom: Plantae
- Clade: Tracheophytes
- Clade: Angiosperms
- Clade: Eudicots
- Clade: Rosids
- Order: Cucurbitales
- Family: Cucurbitaceae; Juss.

Type genus
- Cucurbita L.

Tribes and genera
- See text

= Cucurbitaceae =

Cucurbitaceae Temporal range: Early Paleocene to Recent, 62–0 Ma

Family of plants

The Cucurbitaceae (/kjuːˌkɜːrbɪˈteɪsiːˌiː/ kew-KUR-bih-TAY-see-ee), also called cucurbits or the gourd family, are a plant family consisting of about 965 species in 101 genera. Some commonly cultivated cucurbits include:

- Cucurbita – squash, pumpkin, zucchini (courgette), some gourds.
- Lagenaria – calabash (bottle gourd) and other, ornamental gourds.
- Coccinia – the ivy gourd.
- Citrullus – watermelon (C. lanatus, C. colocynthis), plus several other species.
- Cucumis – cucumber (C. sativus); various melons and vines.
- Momordica – bitter melon.
- Luffa – commonly called 'luffa' or ‘luffa squash'; sometimes spelled loofah. Young fruits may be cooked; when fully ripened, they become fibrous and unpalatable, thus becoming the source of the loofah scrubbing sponge.
- Cyclanthera – caigua.
- Sicyos edulis – chayote.
- Gerrardanthus — the species G. macrorhizus has gained some popularity as an ornamental caudiciform plant.
- Xerosicyos — the silver dollar vine (Xerosicyos danguyi) is popular amongst horticulturists and plant collectors.

The plants in this family are grown around the tropics and in temperate areas of the world, where those with edible fruits were among the earliest cultivated plants in both the Old and New Worlds. The family Cucurbitaceae ranks among the highest of plant families for number and percentage of species used as human food. The name Cucurbitaceae comes to international scientific vocabulary from Neo-Latin, from Cucurbita, the type genus, + -aceae, a standardized suffix for plant family names in modern taxonomy. The genus name comes from the Classical Latin word cucurbita, meaning "gourd".

== Description ==
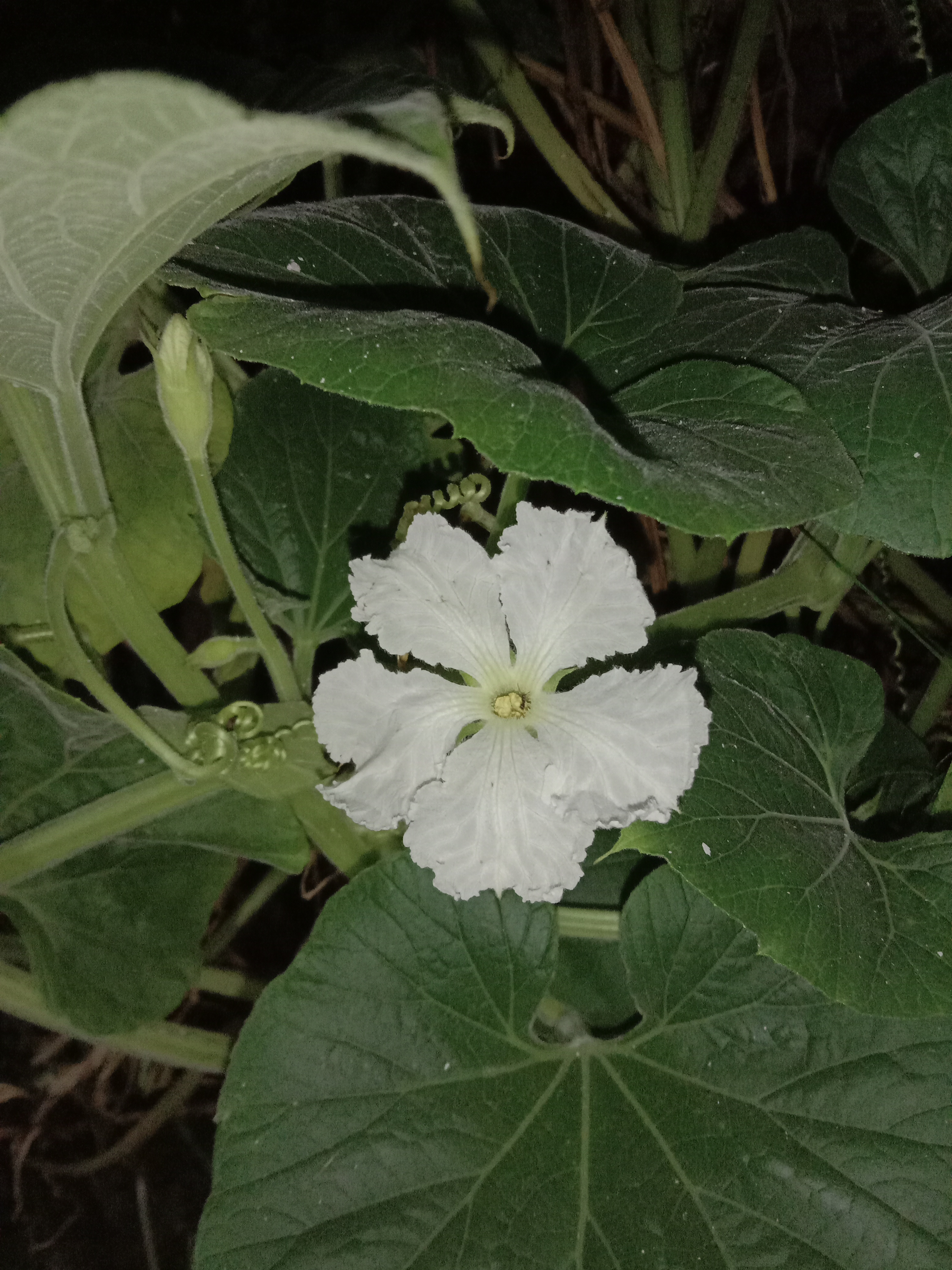
Flower of Lagenaria captured at night

Most of the plants in this family are annual vines, but some are woody lianas, thorny shrubs, or trees (Dendrosicyos). Many species have large, yellow or white flowers. The stems are hairy and pentangular. Tendrils are present at 90° to the leaf petioles at nodes. Leaves are exstipulate, alternate, simple palmately lobed or palmately compound. The flowers are unisexual, with male and female flowers on different plants (dioecious) or on the same plant (monoecious). The female flowers have inferior ovaries. The fruit is often a kind of modified berry called a pepo.

== Fossil history ==
One of the oldest fossil cucurbits so far is †Cucurbitaciphyllum lobatum from the Paleocene epoch, found at Shirley Canal, Montana. It was described for the first time in 1924 by the paleobotanist Frank Hall Knowlton. The fossil leaf is palmate, trilobed with rounded lobal sinuses and an entire or serrate margin. It has a leaf pattern similar to the members of the genera Kedrostis, Melothria and Zehneria.

== Classification ==
The family Cucurbitaceae has been divided into two subfamilies. The first, variously named Fevilleoideae, Nhandiroboideae or Zanonioideae, has been shown not to be monophyletic. The second, Cucurbitoideae, is monophyletic. For this reason, a division only to tribal level has been preferred.

=== Tribal classification ===
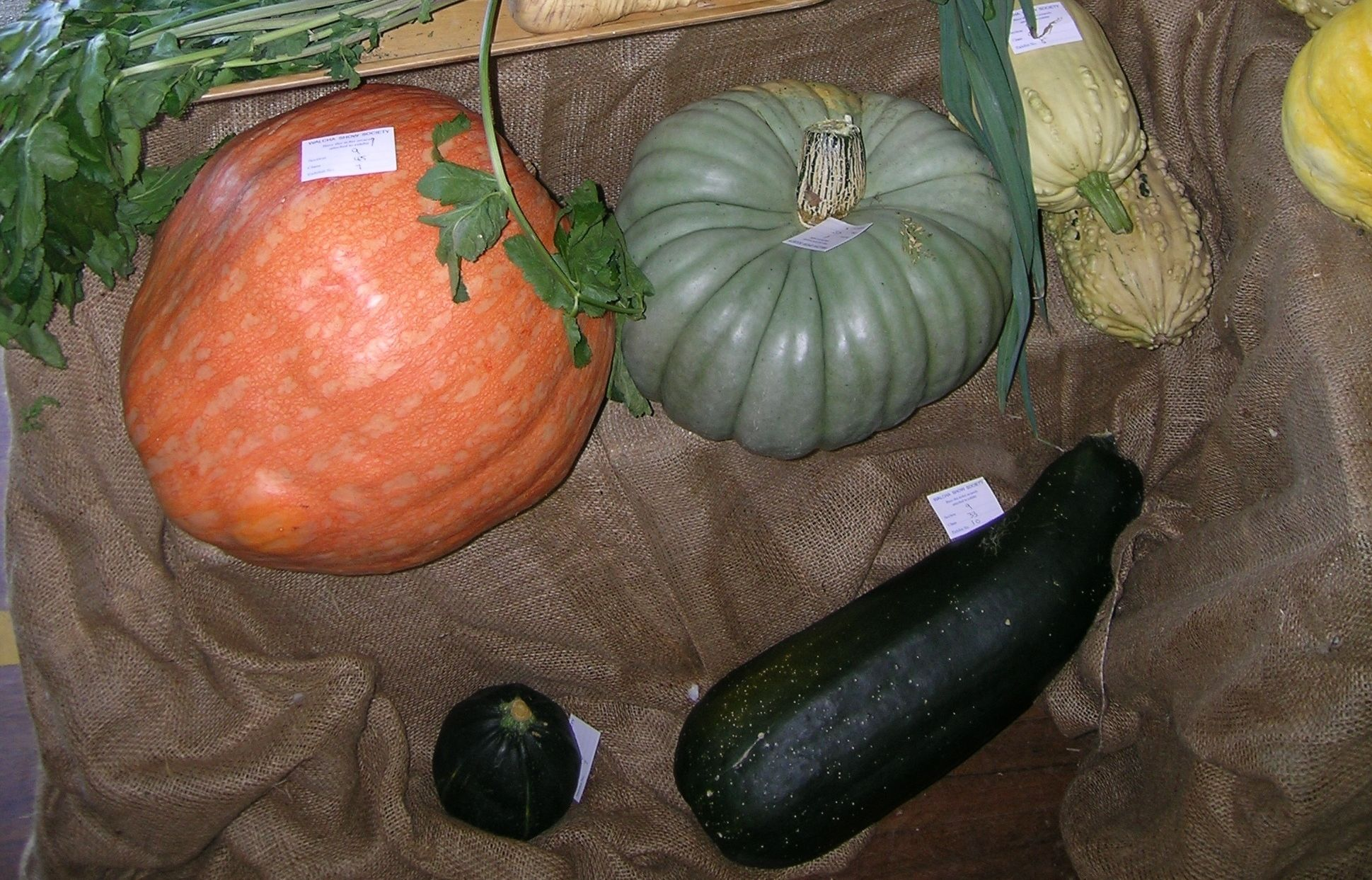
Pumpkins and squashes displayed in a show competition

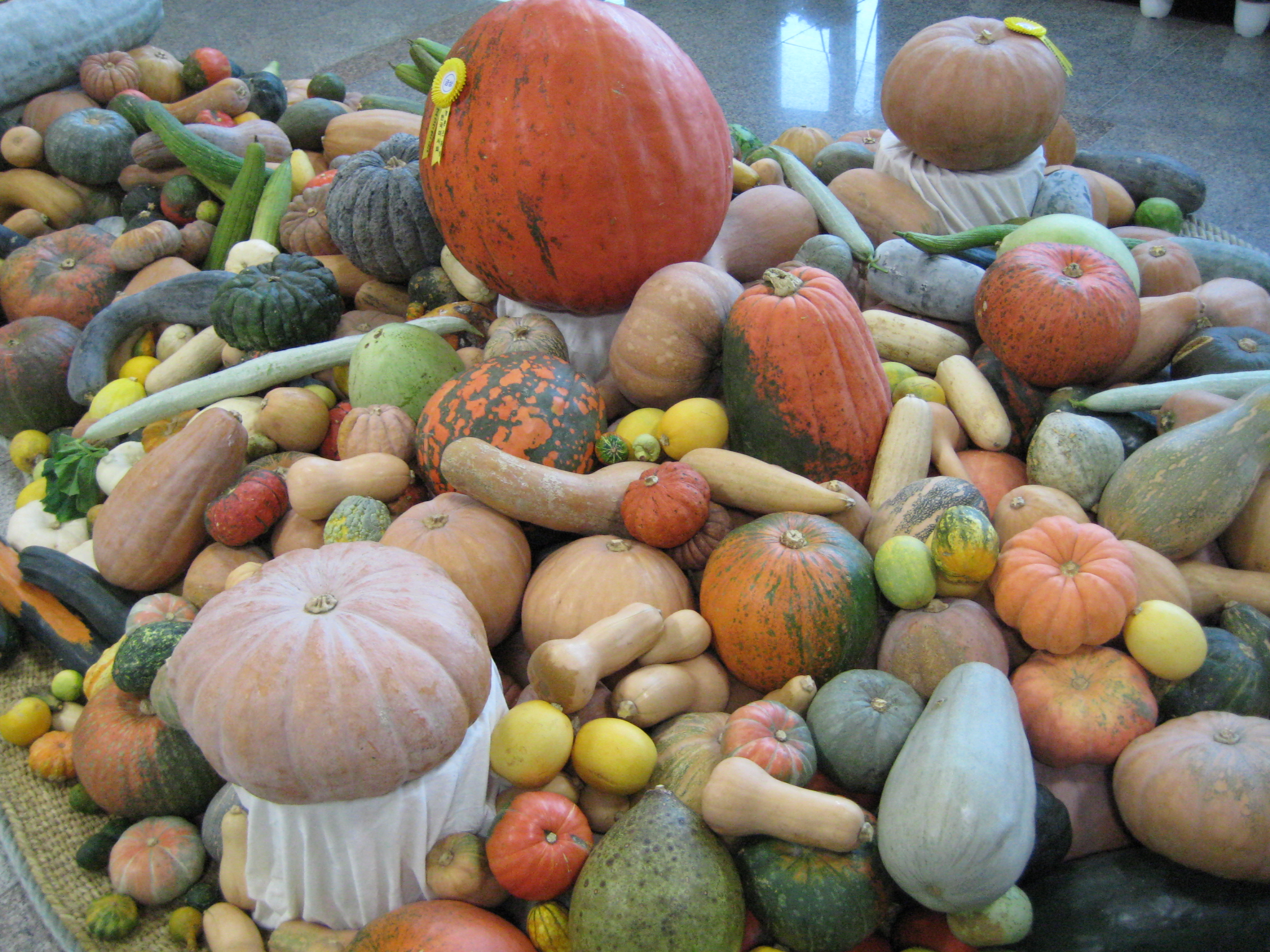
A selection of cucurbits of the South Korean Genebank in Suwon

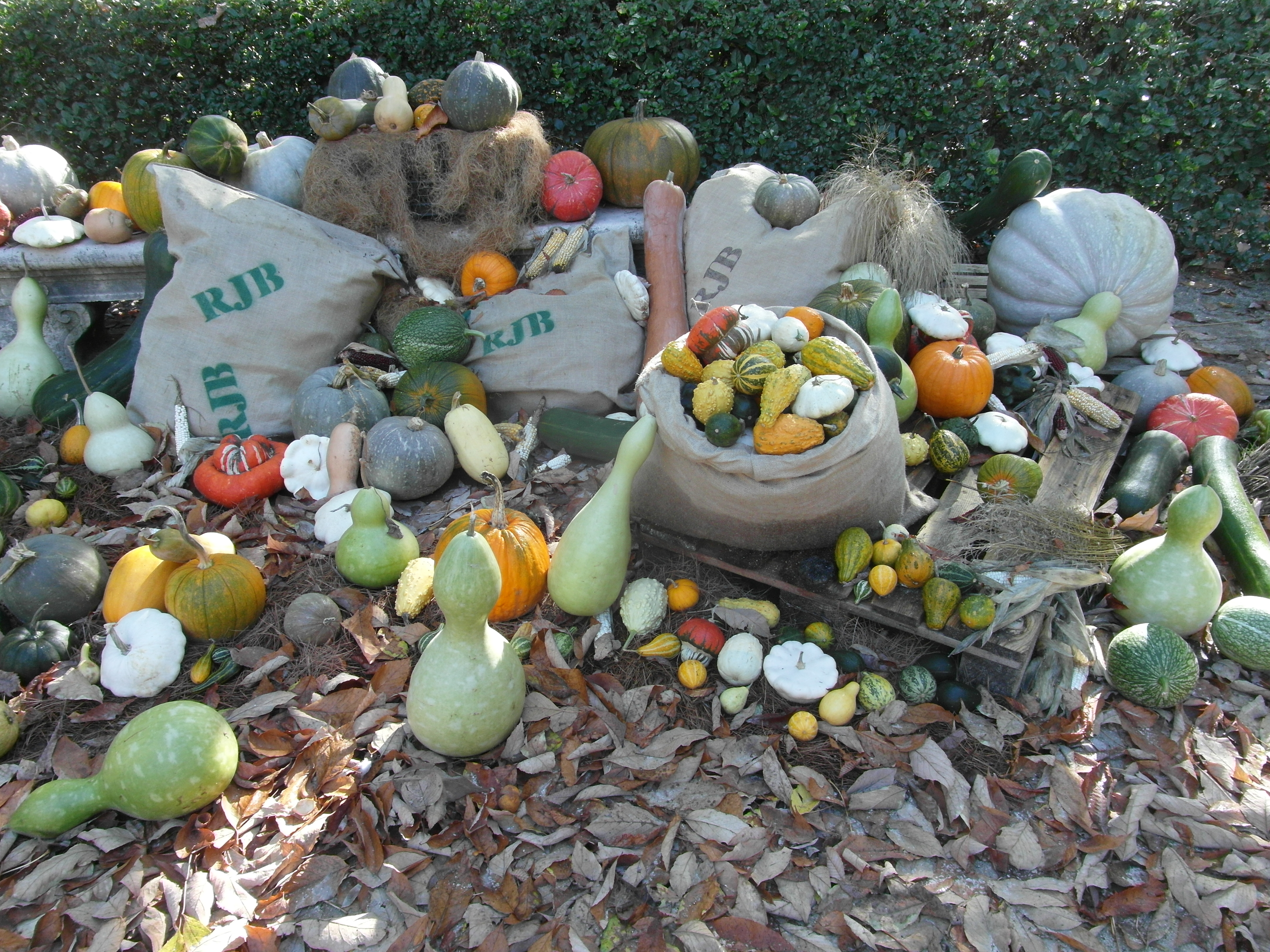
Cucurbits on display at the Real Jardín Botánico de Madrid, with the title "Variedades de calabaza" include gourds and edible species of Cucurbita and Lagenaria.

A 2011 classification of Cucurbitaceae delineated 15 tribes:

- Tribe Gomphogyneae Benth. & Hook.f.
  - Alsomitra (Blume) Spach (1 sp.)
  - Bayabusua (1 sp.)
  - Gomphogyne Griff. (2 spp.)
  - Gynostemma Blume (10 spp.)
  - Hemsleya Cogn. ex F.B.Forbes & Hemsl. (30 spp.)
  - Neoalsomitra Hutch. (12 spp.)
- Tribe Triceratieae A.Rich.
  - Cyclantheropsis Harms (3 spp.)
  - Fevillea L. (8 spp.)
  - Pteropepon (Cogn.) Cogn. (5 spp.)
  - Sicydium Schltdl. (9 spp.)
- Tribe Zanonieae Benth. & Hook.f.
  - Gerrardanthus Harvey in Hook.f. (3–5 spp.)
  - Siolmatra Baill. (1 sp.)
  - Xerosicyos Humbert (5 spp.)
  - Zanonia L. (1 sp.)
- Tribe Actinostemmateae H.Schaef. & S.S.Renner
  - Actinostemma Griff. (3 spp.)
  - Bolbostemma Franquet (2 spp.)
- Tribe Indofevilleeae H.Schaef. & S.S.Renner
  - Indofevillea Chatterjee (2 sp.)
- Tribe Thladiantheae H.Schaef. & S.S.Renner
  - Baijiania A.M.Lu & J.Q.Li (30 spp.)
  - Sinobaijiania C.Jeffrey & W.J.de Wilde (5 spp.)
  - Thladiantha Bunge 1833 (5 spp.)
- Tribe Siraitieae H. Schaef. & S.S. Renner
  - Siraitia Merr. (3–4 spp.)
- Tribe Momordiceae H.Schaef. & S.S.Renner
  - Momordica L. (60 spp.)
- Tribe Joliffieae Schrad.
  - Ampelosicyos Thouars (5 spp.)
  - Cogniauxia Baill. (2 spp.)
  - Telfairia Hook. (3 spp.)
- Tribe Bryonieae Dumort.
  - Austrobryonia H.Schaef. (4 spp.)
  - Bryonia L. (10 spp.)
  - Ecballium A.Rich. (1 sp.)
- Tribe Schizopeponeae C.Jeffrey
  - Herpetospermum Wall. ex Hook.f. (3 spp.)
  - Schizopepon Maxim. (6–8 spp.)
- Tribe Sicyoeae Schrad.
  - Brandegea Cogn. (1 sp.)
  - Cyclanthera Schrad. (40 spp.)
  - Echinocystis Torr. & A.Gray (1 sp.)
  - Echinopepon Naudin (19 spp.)
  - Hanburia Seem. (7 spp.)
  - Hodgsonia Hook.f. & Thomson (2 spp.)
  - Linnaeosicyos H.Schaef. & Kocyan (1 sp.)
  - Luffa Mill. (5–7 spp.)
  - Marah Kellogg (7 spp.)
  - Microsechium Naudin (4 spp.)
  - Nothoalsomitra Hutch. (1 sp.)
  - Parasicyos Dieterle (2 sp.)
  - Sechiopsis Naudin (5 spp.)
  - Sicyocaulis Wiggins (1 sp.)
  - Sicyos L. (64 spp., including Frantzia Pittier and Sechium P.Browne)
  - Sicyosperma A.Gray (1 sp.)
  - Trichosanthes L. (≤100 spp.)
- Tribe Coniandreae Endl.
  - Apodanthera Arn. (16 spp.)
  - Bambekea Cogn. (1 sp.)
  - Ceratosanthes Adans. (4 spp.)
  - Corallocarpus Welw. ex Benth. & Hook.f. (17 spp.)
  - Cucurbitella Walp. (1 sp.)
  - Dendrosicyos Balf.f. (1 sp.)
  - Doyerea Grosourdy (1 sp.)
  - Eureiandra Hook.f. (8 spp.)
  - Gurania (Schltdl.) Cogn. (37 spp.)
  - Halosicyos Mart.Crov (1 sp.)
  - Helmontia Cogn. (2–4 spp.)
  - Ibervillea Greene (8 spp.)
  - Kedrostis Medik. (28 spp.)
  - Psiguria Neck. ex Arn. (6–12 spp.)
  - Seyrigia Keraudren (6 spp.)
  - Trochomeriopsis Cogn. (1 sp.)
  - Wilbrandia Silva Manso (5 spp.)
- Tribe Benincaseae Ser.
  - Acanthosicyos Welw. ex Hook.f. (1 sp.)
  - Benincasa Savi (2 spp., including Praecitrullus Pangalo)
  - Blastania Kotschy & Peyr. (3 spp., including Ctenolepis Hook.f.)
  - Borneosicyos (1–2 spp.)
  - Cephalopentandra Chiov. (1 sp.)
  - Citrullus Schrad. (4 spp.)
  - Coccinia Wight & Arn. (30 spp.)
  - Cucumis L. (65 spp.)
  - Dactyliandra Hook.f. (2 spp.)
  - Diplocyclos (Endl.) T.Post & Kuntze (4 spp.)
  - Indomelothria (2 spp.)
  - Khmeriosicyos (1 sp.)
  - Lagenaria Ser. (6 spp.)
  - Lemurosicyos Keraudren (1 sp.)
  - Melothria L. (12 spp., including M. scabra)
  - Muellerargia Cogn. (2 sp.)
  - Oreosyce Hook.f. (1 sp.)
  - Papuasicyos (8 spp.)
  - Peponium Engl. (20 spp.)
  - Raphidiocystis Hook.f. (5 spp.)
  - Ruthalicia C.Jeffrey (2 spp.)
  - Scopellaria W.J.de Wilde & Duyfjes (2 spp.)
  - Solena Lour. (3 spp.)
  - Trochomeria Hook.f. (8 spp.)
  - Zehneria Endl. (ca. 60 spp.)
- Tribe Cucurbiteae Ser.
  - Abobra Naudin (1 sp.)
  - Calycophysum H.Karst. & Triana (5 spp.)
  - Cayaponia Silva Manso (74 spp.)
  - Cionosicys Griseb. (4–5 spp.)
  - Cucurbita L. (15 spp.)
  - Penelopeia Urb. (2 spp.)
  - Peponopsis Naudin (1 sp.)
  - Polyclathra Bertol. (6 spp.)
  - Schizocarpum Schrad. (11 spp.)
  - Selysia Cogn. (4 spp.)
  - Sicana Naudin (4 spp.)
  - Tecunumania Standl. & Steyerm. (1 sp.)

=== Systematics ===
Modern molecular phylogenetics suggest the following relationships:

Detailed Cladogram showing Cucurbitaceae phylogeny

- Cucurbitaceae
  - - Gomphogyneae
      - Alsomitra
      - - Bayabusua
        - - - Hemsleya
            - Gomphogyne
          - - Gynostemma
            - Neoalsomitra
  - - - Triceratieae
        - Fevillea
        - - Pteropepon
          - - Cyclantheropsis
            - Sicydium
      - Zanonieae
        - Gerrardanthus
        - - - Zanonia
            - Siolmatra
          - Xerosicyos
    - - - Actinostemmateae
          Actinostemma
      - - - Indofevilleeae
            Indofevillea
        - - - Thladiantheae
              - Baijiania
              - Thladiantha
          - - - Siraitieae
                Siraitia
            - - - Momordiceae
                  Momordica
              - - - Joliffieae
                    - Cogniauxia
                    - - Telfairia
                      - Ampelosicyos
                - - - Bryonieae
                      - - Ecballium
                        - Bryonia
                      - Austrobryonia
                  - - - Sicyoeae
                        - - Nothoalsomitra
                          - - Hodgsonia
                            - - - Echinocystis
                                - Marah
                              - - - Echinopepon
                                  - Frantzia
                                - - Cyclanthera
                                  - Hanburia
                                - Sicyos
                        - - Linnaeosicyos
                          - - Luffa
                            - Trichosanthes
                    - - Schizopeponeae
                        - Schizopepon
                        - Herpetospermum
                    - - - Coniandreae
                          - - Bambekea
                            - Eureiandra
                          - - Dendrosicyos
                            - - - Trochomeriopsis
                                - Seyrigia
                              - - Corallocarpus
                                - - Cucurbitella
                                  - - - Doyerea
                                      - - Wilbrandia
                                        - - Psiguria
                                          - - Helmontia
                                            - Gurania
                                    - Melotrianthus
                                    - - Kedrostis
                                      - - - - Ceratosanthes
                                            - Halosicyos
                                          - Apodanthera
                                        - - Tumamoca
                                          - Ibervillea
                      - - Cucurbiteae
                          - - Polyclathra
                            - - Peponopsis
                              - Cucurbita
                          - - - Penelopeia
                              - Calycophysum
                              - Sicana
                            - - Tecunumania
                              - - Schizocarpum
                                - - Cionosicys
                                  - - Abobra
                                    - Cayaponia
                        - Benincaseae
                          - Zehneria
                          - - - - Citrullus
                                - - Peponium
                                  - Lagenaria
                              - - Acanthosicyos
                                - - - Raphidiocystis
                                    - - Cephalopentandra
                                      - - Lemurosicyos
                                        - - Solena
                                          - Borneosicyos
                                  - - Benincasa
                                    - - Ctenolepis
                                      - - Dactyliandra
                                        - Trochomeria
                            - - - Ruthalicia
                                - - Indomelothria
                                  - Melothria
                              - - - - Coccinia
                                    - Diplocyclos
                                  - - Papuasicyos
                                    - Scopellaria
                                - - Muellerargia
                                  - Cucumis

== Pests and diseases ==
Sweet potato whitefly is the vector of a number of cucurbit viruses that cause yellowing symptoms throughout the southern United States.
