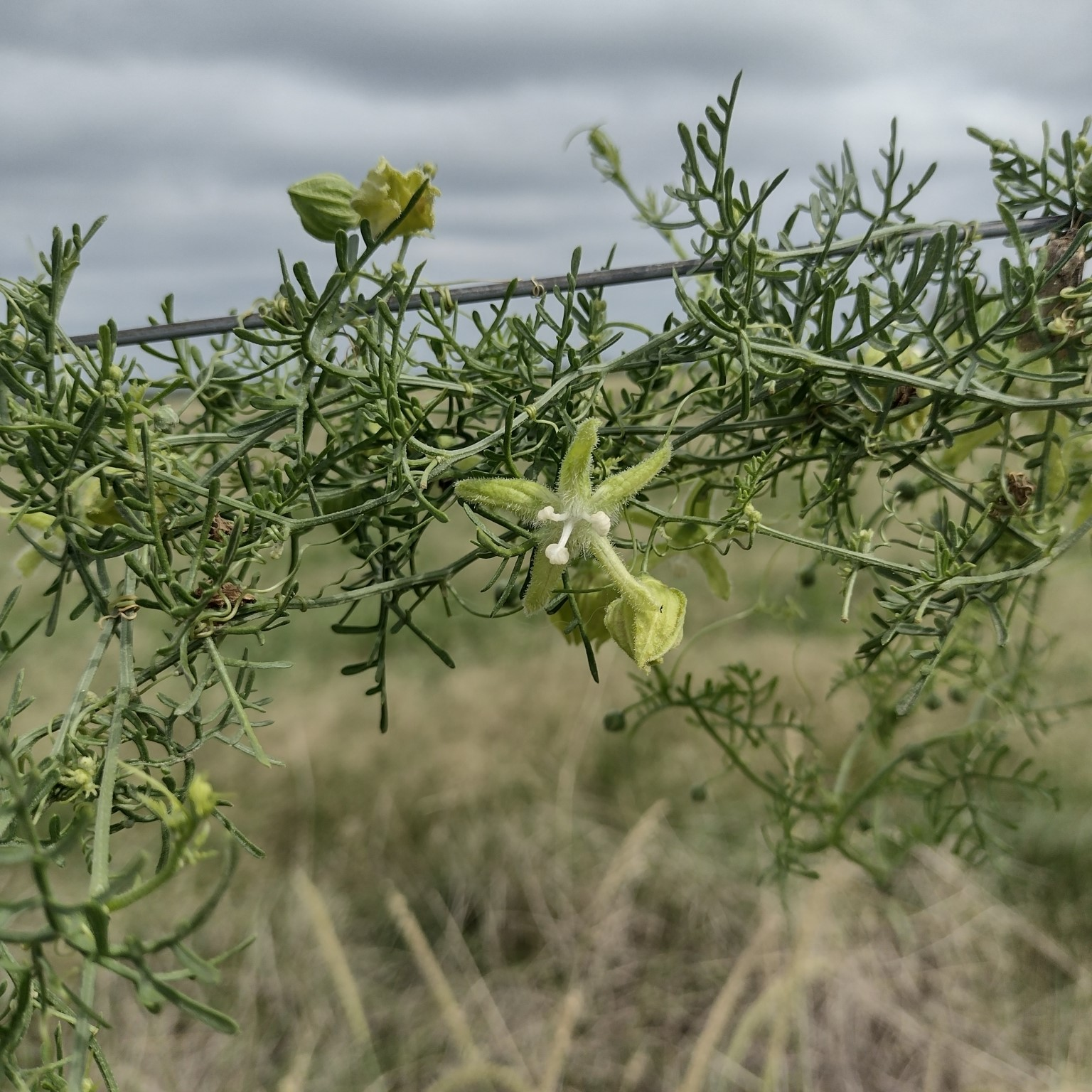

Scientific classification
- Kingdom: Plantae
- Clade: Tracheophytes
- Clade: Angiosperms
- Clade: Eudicots
- Clade: Rosids
- Order: Cucurbitales
- Family: Cucurbitaceae
- Subfamily: Cucurbitoideae
- Tribe: Cucurbiteae
- Genus: Abobra; Naudin
- Species: A. tenuifolia

Binomial name
- Abobra tenuifolia (Gillies) Cogn.

= Abobra =

Genus of flowering plants

Abobra is a monotypic genus of the gourd family containing the one species Abobra tenuifolia (syn. Abobra viridiflora Naudin, Bryonia tenuifolia Hook. & Arn.). It is a diecious, perennial climbing plant reaching up to the height of 4 m (13 ft). It is native to South America (Argentina, Brazil, and Uruguay) and is sometimes cultivated as ornamental plants and also for its edible fruits. The flowers exude a strong fragrance and are of pale green color and blossom between July and August. The seeds ripen between September and October. The fruit is ovoid and has a diameter of 14 mm. Common names include cranberry gourd.
