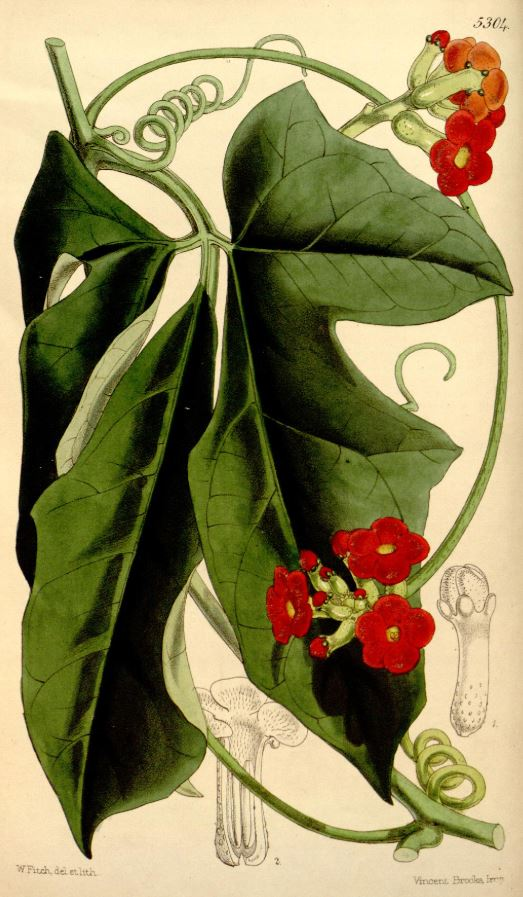
- Psiguria warscewiczi

Scientific classification
- Kingdom: Plantae
- Clade: Embryophytes
- Clade: Tracheophytes
- Clade: Angiosperms
- Clade: Eudicots
- Clade: Rosids
- Order: Cucurbitales
- Family: Cucurbitaceae
- Genus: Psiguria; Arn.

= Psiguria =

Genus of plants

Psiguria is a genus of flowering plants belonging to the family Cucurbitaceae.

Its native range is Mexico to Tropical America.

Species:

- Psiguria pedata (L.) R.A.Howard
- Psiguria racemosa C.Jeffrey
- Psiguria ternata (M.Roem.) C.Jeffrey
- Psiguria triphylla (Miq.) C.Jeffrey
- Psiguria umbrosa (Kunth) C.Jeffrey
- Psiguria warscewiczii (Hook.f.) Wunderlin
