= Parasicyos =

Scientific classification
- Kingdom: Plantae
- Clade: Embryophytes
- Clade: Tracheophytes
- Clade: Angiosperms
- Clade: Eudicots
- Clade: Rosids
- Order: Cucurbitales
- Family: Cucurbitaceae
- Genus: Parasicyos; Dieterle

Genus of plants

Parasicyos is a genus of flowering plants belonging to the family Cucurbitaceae.

Its native range is Eastern and Southern Mexico to El Salvador.

== Species ==
Species:

- Parasicyos dieterleae Lira & R.Torres
- Parasicyos maculatus Dieterle
