= Calycophysum =

Scientific classification
- Kingdom: Plantae
- Clade: Tracheophytes
- Clade: Angiosperms
- Clade: Eudicots
- Clade: Rosids
- Order: Cucurbitales
- Family: Cucurbitaceae
- Subfamily: Cucurbitoideae
- Tribe: Cucurbiteae
- Genus: Calycophysum; H.Karst. & Triana

Species
- See text

Genus of flowering plants

Calycophysum is a genus of the gourd family.

== Species ==
- Calycophysum brevipes Pittier
- Calycophysum cordatum Pittier
- Calycophysum gracile Cogn.
- Calycophysum pedunculatum H.Karst. & Triana
- Calycophysum spectabile (Cogn.) C.Jeffrey & Trujillo
- Calycophysum villosum (Cogn.) Pittier
- Calycophysum weberbaueri Harms
