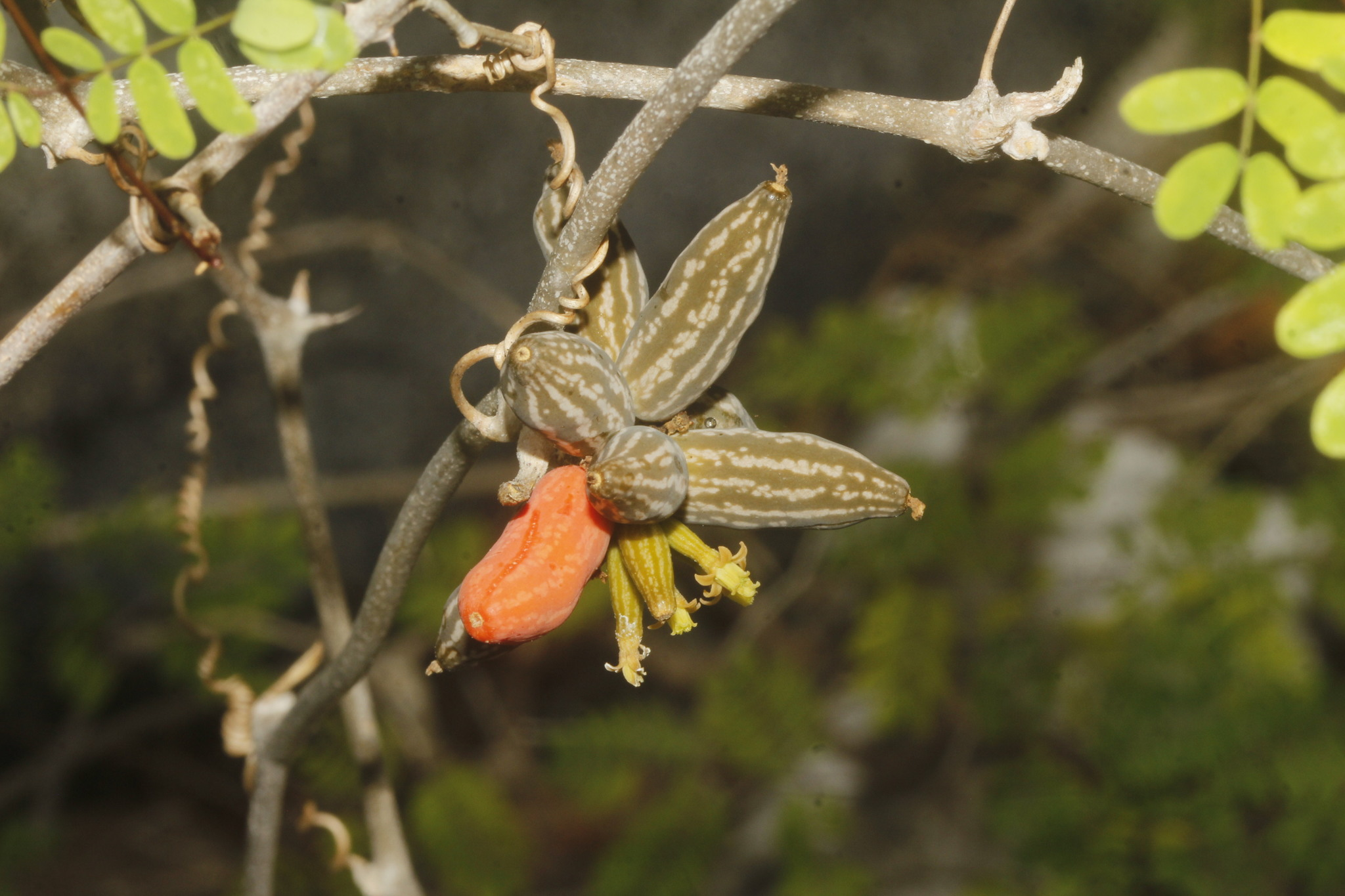
- Doyerea emetocathartica

Scientific classification
- Kingdom: Plantae
- Clade: Embryophytes
- Clade: Tracheophytes
- Clade: Angiosperms
- Clade: Eudicots
- Clade: Rosids
- Order: Cucurbitales
- Family: Cucurbitaceae
- Genus: Doyerea; Grosourdy
- Species: D. emetocathartica

Binomial name
- Doyerea emetocathartica Grosourdy

= Doyerea =

Genus of plants

Doyerea is a monotypic genus of flowering plants belonging to the family Cucurbitaceae. The only species is D. emetocathartica.

Its native range is Mexico to Venezuela, Caribbean.
