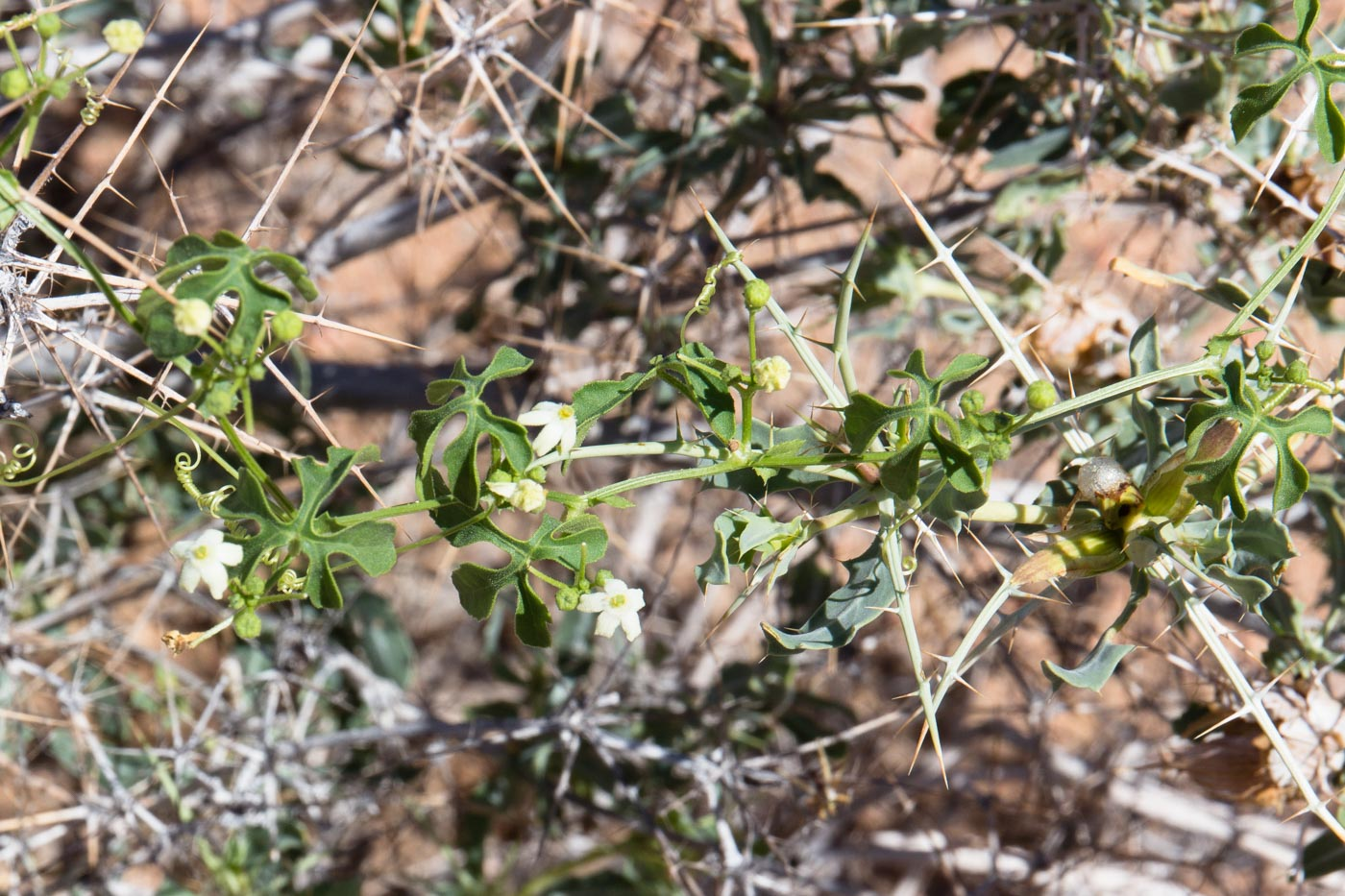
- Dactyliandra.jpg

Scientific classification
- Kingdom: Plantae
- Clade: Embryophytes
- Clade: Tracheophytes
- Clade: Angiosperms
- Clade: Eudicots
- Clade: Rosids
- Order: Cucurbitales
- Family: Cucurbitaceae
- Genus: Dactyliandra (Hook.f.) Hook.f.

= Dactyliandra =

Genus of flowering plants

Dactyliandra is a genus of flowering plants belonging to the family Cucurbitaceae.

Its native range is Angola to Namibia.

Species:

- Dactyliandra welwitschii Hook.f.
