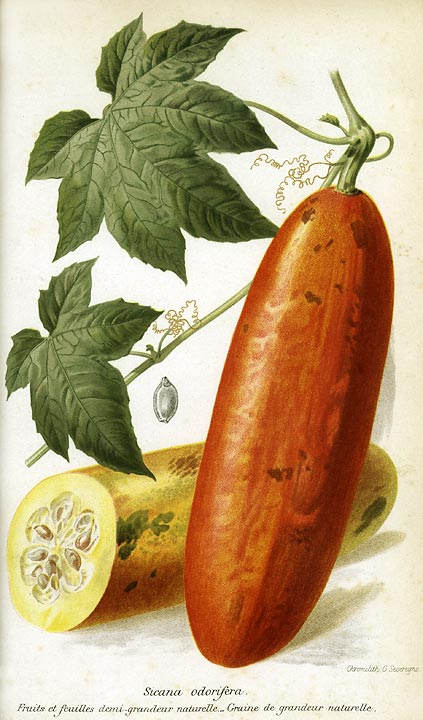
- Sicana odorifera

Scientific classification
- Kingdom: Plantae
- Clade: Tracheophytes
- Clade: Angiosperms
- Clade: Eudicots
- Clade: Rosids
- Order: Cucurbitales
- Family: Cucurbitaceae
- Subfamily: Cucurbitoideae
- Tribe: Cucurbiteae
- Genus: Sicana; Naudin

= Sicana =

Genus of flowering plants

Sicana is a small genus of flowering plants in the family Cucurbitaceae. There are three or four species, found in rainforest and secondary scrub in the Caribbean and Central America.

== Species ==
According to Hanno Schaefer and Susanne Renner, there are four species in the genus. As of March 2016, The Plant List gave only three accepted species:

- Sicana odorifera (Vell.) Naudin
- Sicana sphaerica Hook.
- Sicana trinitensis Cheesman
