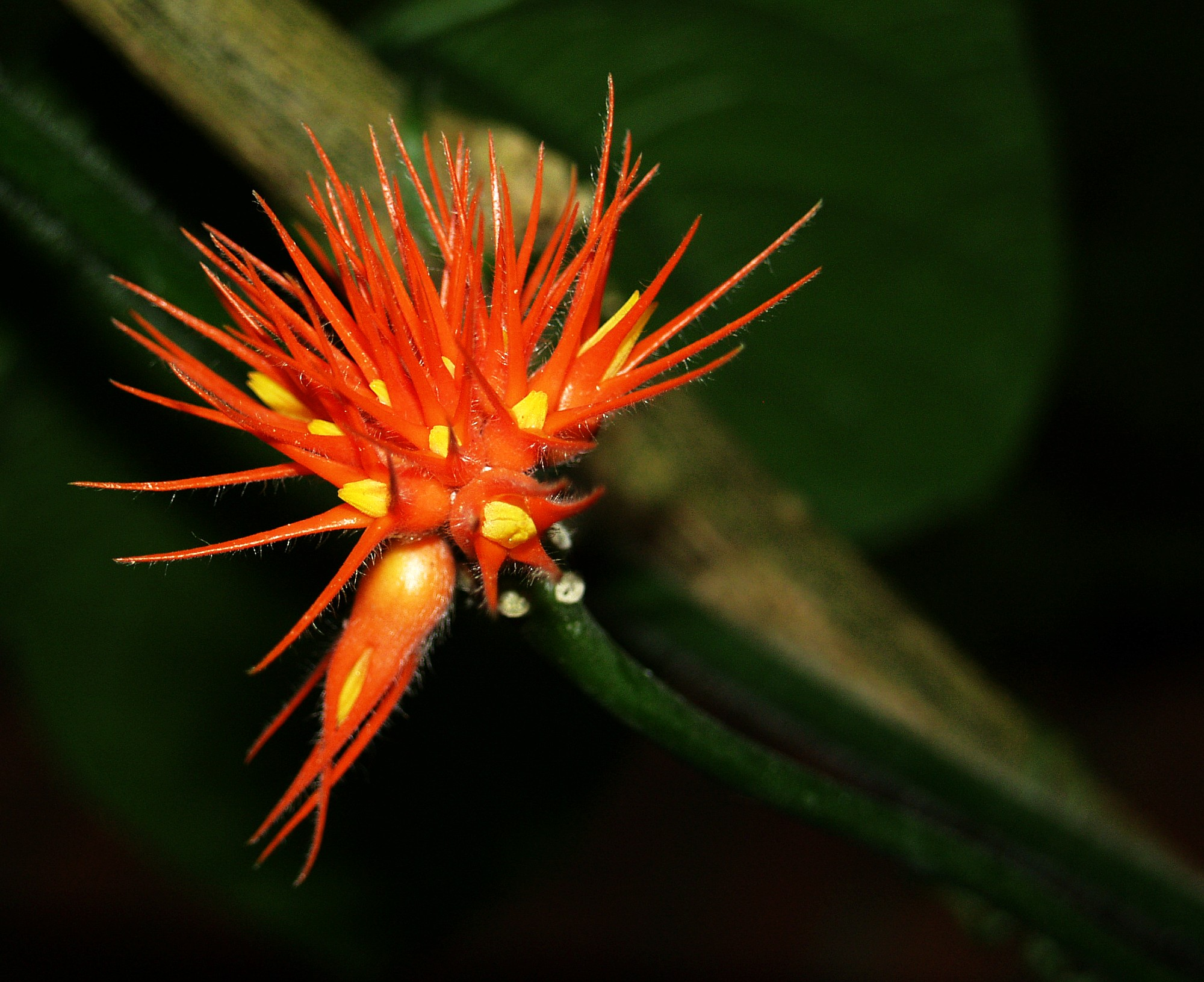

Scientific classification
- Kingdom: Plantae
- Clade: Embryophytes
- Clade: Tracheophytes
- Clade: Angiosperms
- Clade: Eudicots
- Clade: Rosids
- Order: Cucurbitales
- Family: Cucurbitaceae
- Genus: Gurania (Schltdl.) Cogn.

= Gurania =

Genus of plants

Gurania is a genus of flowering plants belonging to the family Cucurbitaceae.

Its native range is Mexico to Southern Tropical America.

== Species ==
Species:

- Gurania acuminata Cogn.
- Gurania bignoniacea (Poepp. & Endl.) C.Jeffrey
- Gurania brevipedunculata Cogn.
- Gurania calathina M.Nee & Gomes-Costa
- Gurania candolleana Cogn.
- Gurania capitata (Poepp. & Endl.) Cogn.
- Gurania cinerea Suess.
- Gurania cogniauxiana Barb.Rodr.
- Gurania crinita Huber
- Gurania eriantha (Poepp. & Endl.) Cogn.
- Gurania gracilis Cogn.
- Gurania guentheri Harms
- Gurania huberi Cogn.
- Gurania huebneri Harms
- Gurania insolita Cogn.
- Gurania jeffreyi M.Nee & Gomes-Costa
- Gurania lignosa Cogn.
- Gurania lobata (L.) Pruski
- Gurania longiflora Cogn.
- Gurania longipetala Cogn.
- Gurania makoyana (Lem.) Cogn.
- Gurania malacophylla Barb.Rodr.
- Gurania neei Gomes-Costa
- Gurania nigrescens C.Jeffrey
- Gurania ovata Cogn.
- Gurania oxyphylla C.Jeffrey
- Gurania paulista Cogn.
- Gurania pedata Sprague
- Gurania pseudospinulosa Cogn.
- Gurania pycnocephala Harms
- Gurania reticulata Cogn.
- Gurania rhizantha (Poepp. & Endl.) C.Jeffrey
- Gurania robusta Suess.
- Gurania rufipila Cogn.
- Gurania sellowiana (Schltdl.) Cogn.
- Gurania simplicifolia (Steyerm.) C.Jeffrey
- Gurania sinuata (Benth.) Cogn.
- Gurania smithii Standl.
- Gurania spruceana Cogn.
- Gurania suberosa Standl.
- Gurania subumbellata (Miq.) Cogn.
- Gurania trialata Cogn.
- Gurania tricuspidata Cogn.
- Gurania tubulosa Cogn.
- Gurania vaupesana Cuatrec.
- Gurania velutina Cogn.
- Gurania villosa Cogn.
- Gurania wawrae Cogn.
