= Bayabusua =

Scientific classification
- Kingdom: Plantae
- Clade: Embryophytes
- Clade: Tracheophytes
- Clade: Angiosperms
- Clade: Eudicots
- Clade: Rosids
- Order: Cucurbitales
- Family: Cucurbitaceae
- Genus: Bayabusua; W.J.de Wilde

Genus of flowering plants

Bayabusua is a genus of flowering plants belonging to the family Cucurbitaceae.

Its native range is Malaysian Peninsula.

Species:

- Bayabusua clarkei (King) W.J.de Wilde
