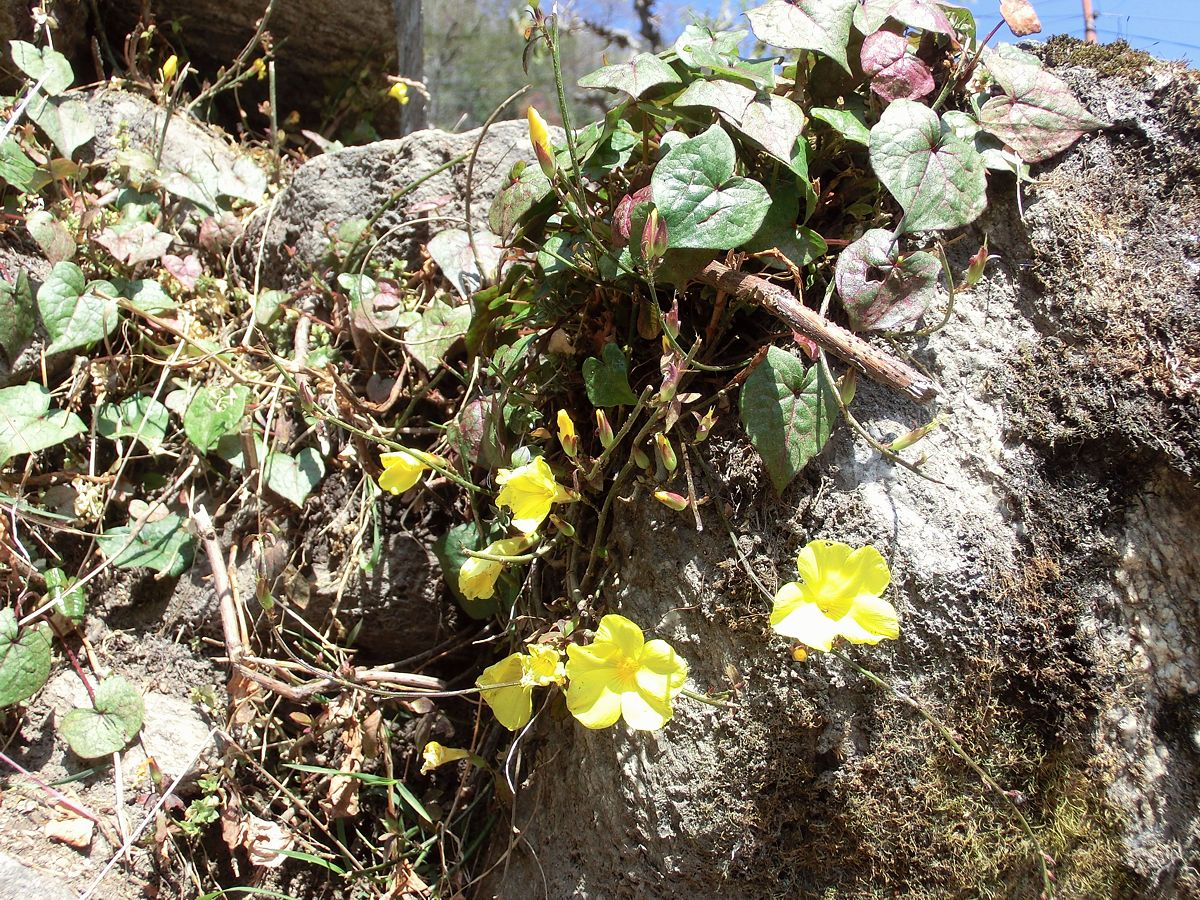
- Herpetospermum pedunculosum. Nepal, Annapurna Conservation Area

Scientific classification
- Kingdom: Plantae
- Clade: Embryophytes
- Clade: Tracheophytes
- Clade: Angiosperms
- Clade: Eudicots
- Clade: Rosids
- Order: Cucurbitales
- Family: Cucurbitaceae
- Genus: Herpetospermum; Wall. ex Benth. & Hook.f.

= Herpetospermum =

Genus of plants

Herpetospermum is a genus of flowering plants belonging to the family Cucurbitaceae.

Its native range is Himalaya to Southern Central China and Northern Myanmar.

Species:

- Herpetospermum darjeelingense (C.B.Clarke) H.Schaef. & S.S.Renner
- Herpetospermum operculatum K.Pradheep, A.Pandey, K.C.Bhatt & E.R.Nayar
- Herpetospermum pedunculosum (Ser.) C.B.Clarke
- Herpetospermum tonglense (C.B.Clarke) H.Schaef. & S.S.Renner
