= Halosicyos =

Scientific classification
- Kingdom: Plantae
- Clade: Embryophytes
- Clade: Tracheophytes
- Clade: Angiosperms
- Clade: Eudicots
- Clade: Rosids
- Order: Cucurbitales
- Family: Cucurbitaceae
- Genus: Halosicyos; Mart.Crov.

Genus of plants

Halosicyos is a genus of flowering plants belonging to the family Cucurbitaceae.

Its native range is Northern Argentina.

== Species ==
Species:

- Halosicyos ragonesei Mart.Crov.
