= Helmontia =

Scientific classification
- Kingdom: Plantae
- Clade: Embryophytes
- Clade: Tracheophytes
- Clade: Angiosperms
- Clade: Eudicots
- Clade: Rosids
- Order: Cucurbitales
- Family: Cucurbitaceae
- Genus: Helmontia; Cogn.

Genus of plants

Helmontia is a genus of flowering plants belonging to the family Cucurbitaceae.

Its native range is from northern South America to northern Brazil. It is found in the countries of Brazil, French Guiana, Guyana, Suriname and Venezuela.

The genus name of Helmontia is in honour of Jan Baptist van Helmont (1580–1644), a chemist, physiologist, and physician from the Spanish Netherlands. It was first described and published in Bull. Soc. Roy. Bot. Belgique Vol.14 on page 239 in 1875.

Known species, according to Kew:

- Helmontia cardiophylla Harms
- Helmontia leptantha (Schltdl.) Cogn.
- Helmontia trujilloi C.Jeffrey
