= Linnaeosicyos =

Scientific classification
- Kingdom: Plantae
- Clade: Embryophytes
- Clade: Tracheophytes
- Clade: Angiosperms
- Clade: Eudicots
- Clade: Rosids
- Order: Cucurbitales
- Family: Cucurbitaceae
- Genus: Linnaeosicyos; H.Schaef. & Kocyan
- Species: L. amara

Binomial name
- Linnaeosicyos amara (L.) H.Schaef. & Kocyan

Synonyms
- Trichosanthes amara L.

Species of flowering plant

Linnaeosicyos is a monotypic genus of flowering plants belonging to the family Cucurbitaceae. The only species is Linnaeosicyos amara (L.) H.Schaef. & Kocyan., which is endemic to the Dominican Republic.

== Taxonomy ==
The genus name of Linnaeosicyos is in honour of Carl Linnaeus (1707–1778). The Latin specific epithet of amara is derived from amarus meaning bitter. Both the genus and species were first described in Syst. Bot. Vol.33 on page 350 in 2008.
