= Muellerargia =

Scientific classification
- Kingdom: Plantae
- Clade: Embryophytes
- Clade: Tracheophytes
- Clade: Angiosperms
- Clade: Eudicots
- Clade: Rosids
- Order: Cucurbitales
- Family: Cucurbitaceae
- Genus: Muellerargia; Cogn.

Genus of flowering plant

Muellerargia is a genus of flowering plants belonging to the family Cucurbitaceae.

Its native range is Madagascar, and southern and eastern Malesia to northern Australia. It is found in Christmas Island, Java, Lesser Sunda Islands, Madagascar, Maluku Islands, New Guinea, Queensland, Sulawesi and Western Australia.

The genus name of Muellerargia is in honour of Johannes Müller Argoviensis (1828–1896), a Swiss botanist who was a specialist in lichens. It was first described and published in A.L.P.P.de Candolle & A.C.P.de Candolle, Monogr. Phan. Vol.3 on page 630 in 1881.

== Species ==
According to Kew:

- Muellerargia jeffreyana Keraudren – Madagascar
- Muellerargia timorensis Cogn. – Java, Bali, Christmas Island, Wallacea, New Guinea, Queensland, Western Australia.
