= Papuasicyos =

Scientific classification
- Kingdom: Plantae
- Clade: Embryophytes
- Clade: Tracheophytes
- Clade: Angiosperms
- Clade: Eudicots
- Clade: Rosids
- Order: Cucurbitales
- Family: Cucurbitaceae
- Genus: Papuasicyos; Duyfjes

Genus of plants

Papuasicyos is a genus of flowering plants belonging to the family Cucurbitaceae.

Its native range is New Guinea.

== Species ==
Species:

- Papuasicyos arfakensis (W.J.de Wilde & Duyfjes) H.Schaef. & S.S.Renner
- Papuasicyos belensis (Merr. & L.M.Perry) H.Schaef. & S.S.Renner
- Papuasicyos carrii (W.J.de Wilde & Duyfjes) H.Schaef. & S.S.Renner
- Papuasicyos hippocrepicus (W.J.de Wilde & Duyfjes) H.Schaef. & S.S.Renner
- Papuasicyos papuanus (Cogn.) Duyfjes
- Papuasicyos parviflorus (W.J.de Wilde & Duyfjes) H.Schaef. & S.S.Renner
- Papuasicyos viridis (W.J.de Wilde & Duyfjes) H.Schaef. & S.S.Renner
