= Pteropepon =

Scientific classification
- Kingdom: Plantae
- Clade: Embryophytes
- Clade: Tracheophytes
- Clade: Angiosperms
- Clade: Eudicots
- Clade: Rosids
- Order: Cucurbitales
- Family: Cucurbitaceae
- Genus: Pteropepon; Cogn.

Genus of plants

Pteropepon is a genus of flowering plants belonging to the family Cucurbitaceae.

Its native range is Western South America to Northwestern Argentina and Brazil.

Species:

- Pteropepon acaranthus (Harms) H.Schaef. & S.S.Renner
- Pteropepon deltoideus (Cogn.) Cogn.
- Pteropepon monospermus (Vell.) Cogn.
- Pteropepon oleiferum Cogollo & Pipoly
- Pteropepon parodii Mart.Crov.
