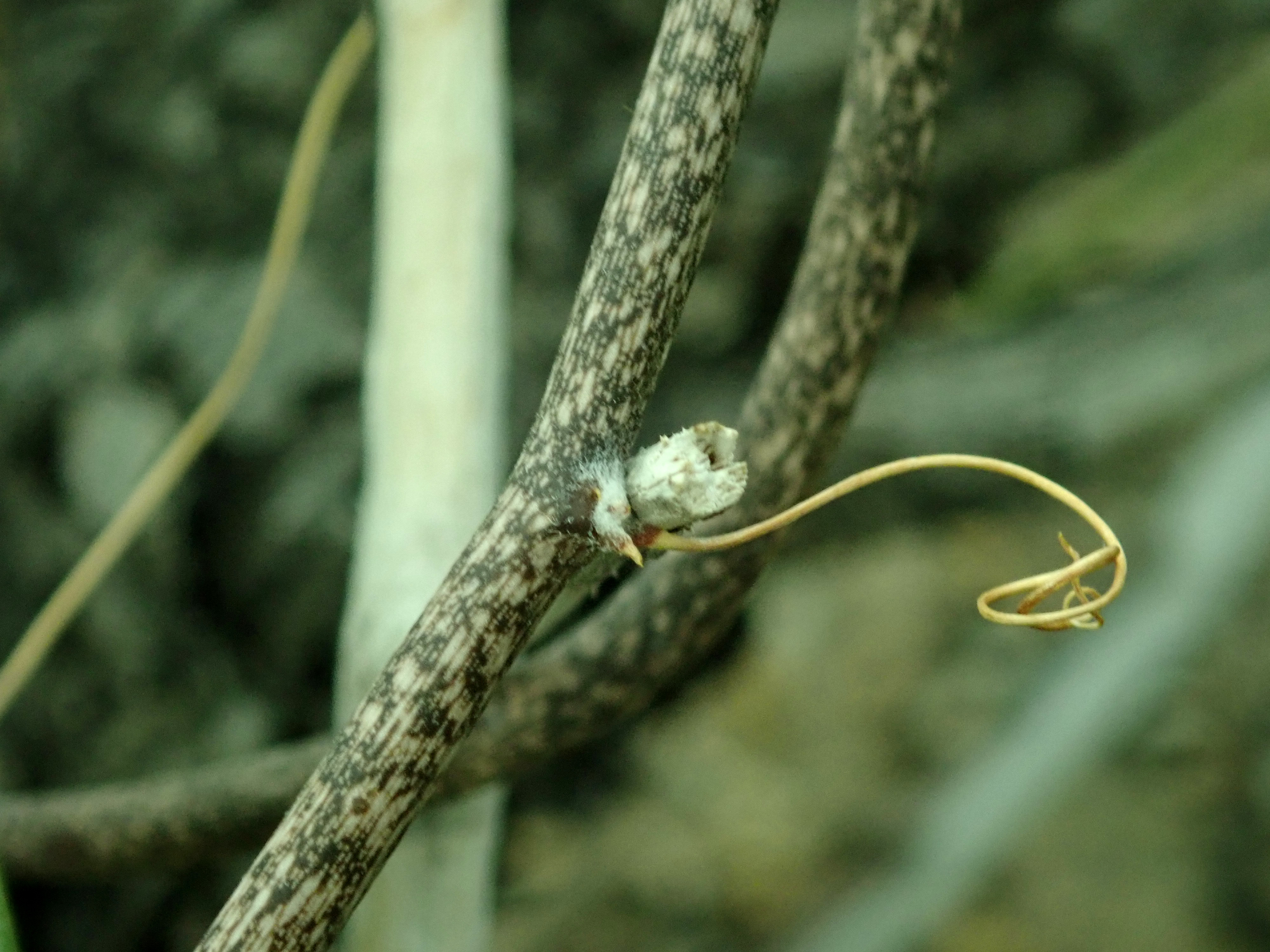
- Seyrigia marnieri

Scientific classification
- Kingdom: Plantae
- Clade: Tracheophytes
- Clade: Angiosperms
- Clade: Eudicots
- Clade: Rosids
- Order: Cucurbitales
- Family: Cucurbitaceae
- Subfamily: Cucurbitoideae
- Tribe: Coniandreae
- Genus: Seyrigia; Keraudren

Species
- Seyrigia bosseri Keraudren; Seyrigia gracilis Keraudren; Seyrigia humbertii Keraudren; Seyrigia marnieri Keraudren; Seyrigia multiflora Keraudren; Seyrigia napifera Rauh

= Seyrigia (plant) =

Genus of flowering plants

Seyrigia is a genus of flowering plants in the family Cucurbitaceae. It includes six species endemic to Madagascar.

== Species ==
Six species are accepted.

- Seyrigia bosseri Keraudren
- Seyrigia gracilis Keraudren
- Seyrigia humbertii Keraudren
- Seyrigia marnieri Keraudren
- Seyrigia multiflora Keraudren
- Seyrigia napifera Rauh
