= Tecunumania =

Scientific classification
- Kingdom: Plantae
- Clade: Embryophytes
- Clade: Tracheophytes
- Clade: Angiosperms
- Clade: Eudicots
- Clade: Rosids
- Order: Cucurbitales
- Family: Cucurbitaceae
- Genus: Tecunumania; Standl. & Steyerm.

Genus of flowering plants

Tecunumania is a genus of flowering plants belonging to the family Cucurbitaceae.

The genus was circumscribed by Paul Carpenter Standley and Julian Alfred Steyermark in Publ. Field Mus. Nat. Hist., Bot. Ser.23 on page 96 in 1944.

The genus name of Tecunumania is in honour of Tecun Uman (1500? – February 20, 1524), who was one of the last rulers of the K'iche' Maya people, in the Highlands of what is now Guatemala.

Its native range stretches from southern Mexico down to Central America. It is found in the countries of Costa Rica, Ecuador, Guatemala and (south-eastern and southwestern) Mexico.

== Species ==
As accepted by Kew;

- Tecunumania quetzalteca Standl. & Steyerm.
- Tecunumania stothertiae Cornejo & H.Schaef.
