= Hanburia (plant) =

Scientific classification
- Kingdom: Plantae
- Clade: Embryophytes
- Clade: Tracheophytes
- Clade: Spermatophytes
- Clade: Angiosperms
- Clade: Eudicots
- Clade: Rosids
- Order: Cucurbitales
- Family: Cucurbitaceae
- Subfamily: Cucurbitoideae
- Tribe: Sicyoeae
- Genus: Hanburia; Seem.

Synonyms
- Elateriopsis Ernst; Nietoa W.Schaffn.

Genus of plants

Hanburia is a genus of plants in the tribe Sicyoeae of the gourd family, Cucurbitaceae. Its native range is from Mexico to Venezuela and Peru. It is found in the countries of Colombia, Costa Rica, Ecuador, Guatemala, Honduras, Mexico, Panamá, Peru and Venezuela.

== Description ==
Mainly perennial climbing and shrubby herbaceous plants. The leaves are alternate (at different levels along a stem) and simple, with lobed, stalked margins, with simple or bi- to trifid (split in 3) tendrils. The flowers are actinomorphic (regular or radially symmetrical) and unisexual (monecium), are grouped in axillary racemes for males, solitary and axillary for females. They consist of a campanulate calyx with 5 lobes, a corolla with 5 petals united at the base. The male flowers have 3 stamens with coherent filaments or connate in a central column. The female flowers have an inferior and trilocular (3 spaced) ovary. The fruits (seed capsules) are ovoid (shaped) and similar to prickly berries.

== Taxonomy ==
The genus name of Hanburia is in honour of Daniel Hanbury (1825–1875), a British botanist and pharmacologist. It was first described and published in Bonplandia (Hannover) Vol.6 on page 293 in 1858.

== Known species ==
According to Kew;

- Hanburia caracasana (Ernst) H.Schaef. & S.S.Renner
- Hanburia grisebachii (Cogn.) H.Schaef. & S.S.Renner
- Hanburia mexicana Seem.
- Hanburia oerstedii (Cogn.) H.Schaef. & S.S.Renner
- Hanburia parviflora Donn.Sm.
- Hanburia spectabilis (Mart.Crov.) H.Schaef. & S.S.Renner
- Hanburia subcyclanthera (C.Jeffrey) H.Schaef. & S.S.Renner

The type species is Hanburia mexicana, from Mexico.
