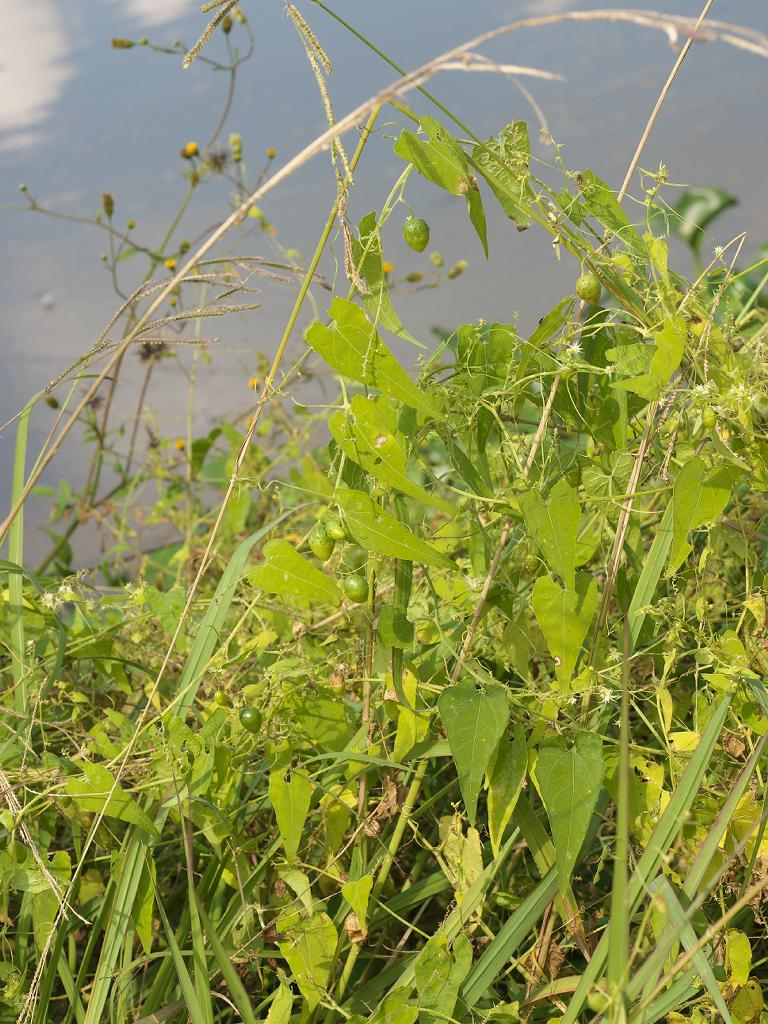
- Actinostemma tenerum

Scientific classification
- Kingdom: Plantae
- Clade: Embryophytes
- Clade: Tracheophytes
- Clade: Angiosperms
- Clade: Eudicots
- Clade: Rosids
- Order: Cucurbitales
- Family: Cucurbitaceae
- Tribe: Actinostemmateae
- Genus: Actinostemma; Griff.

Species
- See text

Synonyms
- Mitrosicyos Maxim.; Pomasterion Miq.

= Actinostemma =

Genus of Cucurbitaceae plants

Actinostemma is a genus of flowering plant in the gourd family Cucurbitaceae. It is native to east Asia. They are slender, weakly twining/climbing annual herbs.

== Species ==
Currently accepted species include:

- Actinostemma lobatum (Maxim.) Maxim. ex Franch. & Sav.
- Actinostemma tenerum Griff.
