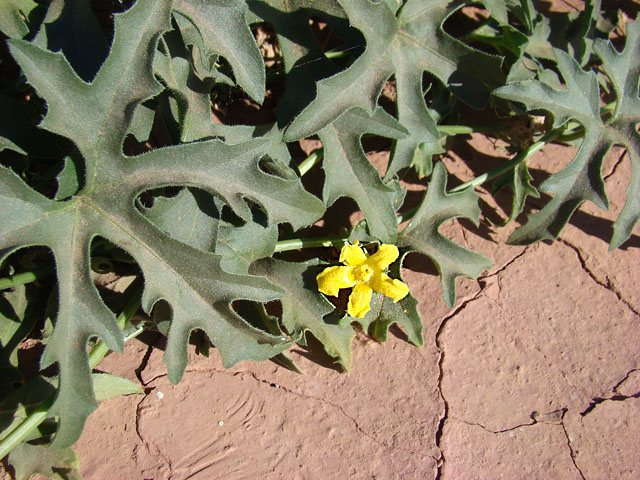

Scientific classification
- Kingdom: Plantae
- Clade: Tracheophytes
- Clade: Angiosperms
- Clade: Eudicots
- Clade: Rosids
- Order: Cucurbitales
- Family: Cucurbitaceae
- Subfamily: Cucurbitoideae
- Tribe: Coniandreae
- Genus: Cucurbitella; Walp. (1845)
- Species: C. asperata

Binomial name
- Cucurbitella asperata (Gillies ex Hook. & Arn.) Walp. (1846)

Synonyms
- Prasopepon Naudin (1866); Schizostigma Arn. (1840); Cucurbita asperata Gillies ex Hook. & Arn. (1833); Cucurbita urkupinana Cárdenas (1945); Cucurbitella cucumifolia (Griseb.) Cogn. (1878); Cucurbitella duriaei (Naudin) Cogn. (1878); Cucurbitella integrifolia Cogn. (1881); Cucurbitella integrifolia var. glabrior Cogn. (1909); Cucurbitella urkupinana (Cárdenas) C.Jeffrey (1978); Prasopepon cucumifolius Griseb. (1874); Prasopepon duriaei Naudin (1866); Schizostigma asperatum (Gillies ex Hook. & Arn.) Arn. (1841)

= Cucurbitella asperata =

Species of flowering plant

Cucurbitella asperata is a species of flowering plant in the cucumber family, Cucurbitaceae. It is the sole species in genus Cucurbitella. It is a climbing tuberous geophyte native to southern tropical South America, ranging from Bolivia to west-central and southern Brazil, Paraguay, Uruguay, and northern Argentina.

The species was first described as Cucurbita asperata in 1833. In 1846 Wilhelm Gerhard Walpers placed it in the genus Cucurbitella, which he had named the prior year.
