= Sinobaijiania =

Scientific classification
- Kingdom: Plantae
- Clade: Embryophytes
- Clade: Tracheophytes
- Clade: Angiosperms
- Clade: Eudicots
- Clade: Rosids
- Order: Cucurbitales
- Family: Cucurbitaceae
- Tribe: Thladiantheae
- Genus: Sinobaijiania; C.Jeffrey & W.J.de Wilde (2006)

Species
- 5; see text

Genus of flowering plants

Sinobaijiania is a genus of flowering plants in the cucumber family, Cucurbitaceae. It includes five species of climbing tuberous geophytes native to southern China, southeastern Tibet, Laos, Thailand, and Taiwan.

== Species ==
Five species are accepted.

- Sinobaijiania decipiens C.Jeffrey & W.J.de Wilde – southeastern Tibet, southern China (southeastern Yunnan, Guangdong, and Hainan)
- Sinobaijiania frondosa W.J.de Wilde & Duyfjes – Thailand
- Sinobaijiania smitinandii W.J.de Wilde & Duyfjes – Thailand
- Sinobaijiania taiwaniana (Hayata) C.Jeffrey & W.J.de Wilde – Taiwan
- Sinobaijiania yunnanensis (A.M.Lu & Zhi Y.Zhang) C.Jeffrey & W.J.de Wilde – southwestern and southern Yunnan and northern Laos
