= Penelopeia =

Scientific classification
- Kingdom: Plantae
- Clade: Embryophytes
- Clade: Tracheophytes
- Clade: Angiosperms
- Clade: Eudicots
- Clade: Rosids
- Order: Cucurbitales
- Family: Cucurbitaceae
- Tribe: Cucurbiteae
- Genus: Penelopeia; Urb. (1921)

Species
- Penelopeia sphaerica (Alain) H.Schaef. & S.S.Renner; Penelopeia suburceolata (Cogn.) Urb.

Synonyms
- Anacaona Alain (1980)

Genus of flowering plants

Penelopeia is a genus of flowering plants in the cucumber family, Cucurbitaceae. It includes two species native to Hispaniola.

- Penelopeia sphaerica (Alain) H.Schaef. & S.S.Renner
- Penelopeia suburceolata (Cogn.) Urb.
