= Peponopsis =

Scientific classification
- Kingdom: Plantae
- Clade: Embryophytes
- Clade: Tracheophytes
- Clade: Angiosperms
- Clade: Eudicots
- Clade: Rosids
- Order: Cucurbitales
- Family: Cucurbitaceae
- Genus: Peponopsis; Naudin
- Species: P. adhaerens

Binomial name
- Peponopsis adhaerens Naudin

Genus of plants

Peponopsis is a monotypic genus of flowering plants belonging to the family Cucurbitaceae. The only species is Peponopsis adhaerens.

Its native range is Mexico.
