= Debabarta Chatterjee =

Indian botanist

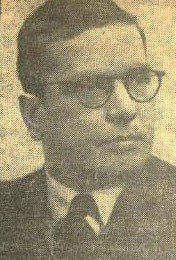
- Born: 2 April 1911; Hugli-Chuchura, India
- Died: 24 September 1960 (aged 49); Shibpur
- Citizenship: India
- Education: Presidency University, Kolkata; University of Edinburgh
- Known for: endemic plants of India
- Awards: Special Centenary Medal of the Société botanique de France; Brühl Memorial Medal of The Asiatic Society, 1950
- Scientific career
- Fields: Botany
- Workplaces: Mandalay University; Cotton University; Royal Botanic Gardens, Kew; Indian Botanic Garden
- Doctoral advisor: William Wright Smith
- Author abbrev. (botany): Chatterjee

Debabarta Chatterjee (1911–1960) was a botanist from India, whose primary scholarly focus was the endemic flora of India.

== Life ==
Chatterjee was born in Hugli-Chuchura, India on 2 April 1911. He received his Master of Science (M.Sc.) from Presidency University, Kolkata (then called Presidency College) in 1937. He conducted his doctoral work at the University of Edinburgh while being mentored by Sir William Wright Smith and received his Ph.D. in 1939. His first professional posting was as a lecturer at Mandalay University (then called Mandalay College) in Burma. Following the invasion of Burma by Japan in 1942 he moved to become a lecturer at Cotton University (then called Cotton College, Guwahati) in Assam, India. In 1946 he became the botanist for India at the Royal Botanic Gardens, Kew. From 1949 to 1955 he served as systematic botanist at the Indian Agricultural Research Institute in Delhi. In 1954 he served as the Vice President of the International Botanical Congress in Paris. In 1955 he became the superintendent of the Acharya Jagadish Chandra Bose Indian Botanic Garden in Shibpur. On 24 September 1960 he was shot and killed by another member of the Botanic Garden's staff.

== Work ==
His Ph.D. thesis was entitled "Endemic Flora of India and Burma" was published by the Journal of the Asiatic Society of Bengal. During his career he published on topics including the systematics of endemic plant species in India and Burma, domestication of rice and cultivation of wheat.

== Awards ==
In recognition of his botanical scholarship he was awarded the Special Centenary Medal of the Société botanique de France and in 1955 the Brühl Memorial Medal of The Asiatic Society (then called the Asiatic Society of Bengal).

== Legacy ==
He is the authority for at least 33 taxa including: IPNI. List of plant names with authority Chatterjee.
