= List of Cucurbitales of South Africa =

Flowering plants in the order Cucurbitales recorded from South Africa

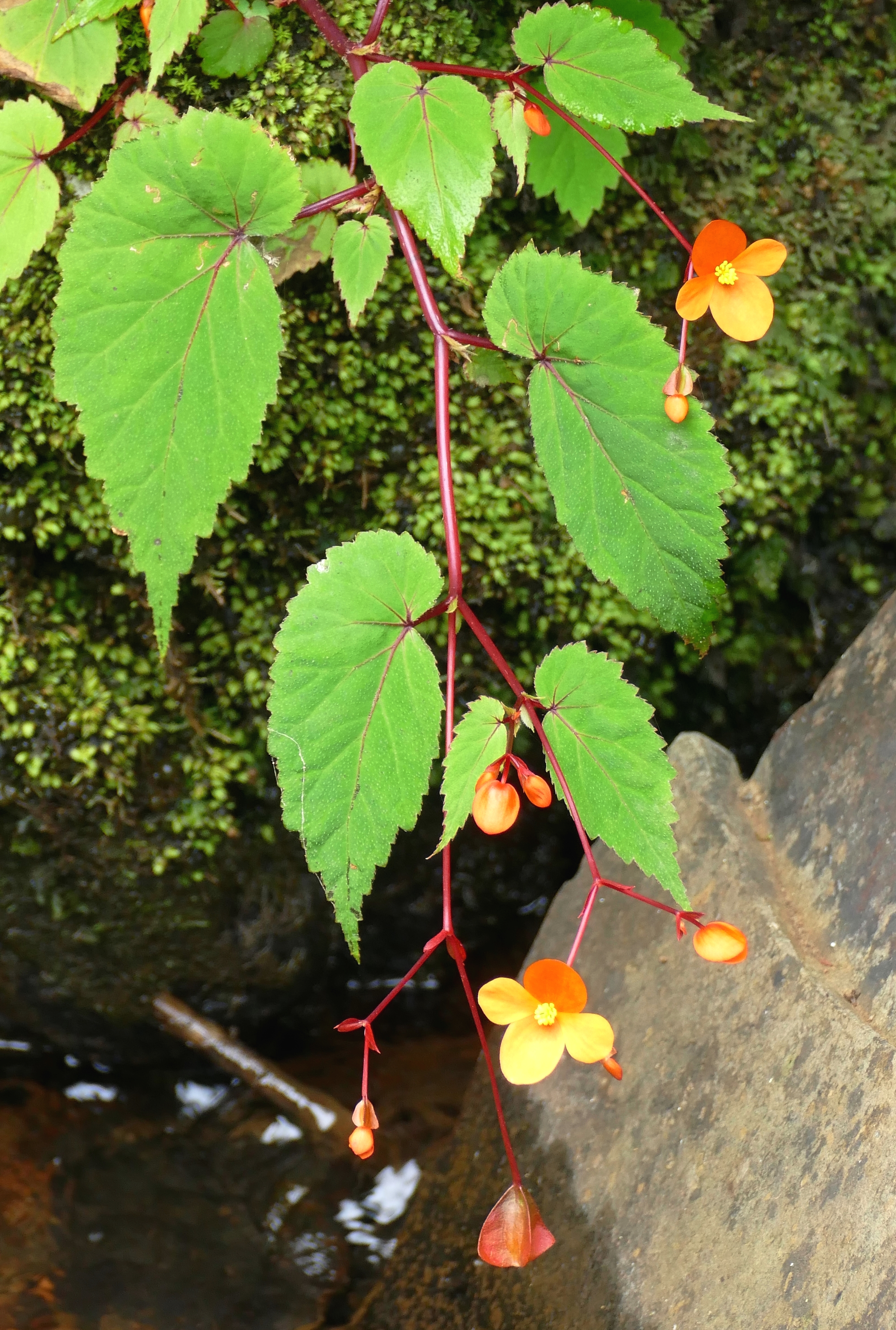
Sutherland's begonia
(Begonia sutherlandii)

The Cucurbitales are an order of flowering plants, included in the rosid group of dicotyledons with a cosmopolitan distribution, particularly diverse in the tropics. The order includes shrubs and trees, together with many herbs and climbers. One major characteristic of the Cucurbitales is the presence of unisexual flowers, mostly pentacyclic, with thick pointed petals (whenever present). The pollination is usually performed by insects, but wind pollination is also present (in Coriariaceae and Datiscaceae).

The order consists of roughly 2600 species in eight families. The largest families are Begoniaceae (begonia family) with around 1500 species and Cucurbitaceae (gourd family) with around 900 species. These two families include the only economically important plants. Specifically, the Cucurbitaceae (gourd family) include some food species, such as squash, pumpkin (both from Cucurbita), watermelon (Citrullus vulgaris), and cucumber and melons (Cucumis). The Begoniaceae are known for their horticultural species, of which there are over 130 with many more varieties.

The anthophytes are a grouping of plant taxa bearing flower-like reproductive structures. They were formerly thought to be a clade comprising plants bearing flower-like structures. The group contained the angiosperms - the extant flowering plants, such as roses and grasses - as well as the Gnetales and the extinct Bennettitales.

23,420 species of vascular plant have been recorded in South Africa, making it the sixth most species-rich country in the world and the most species-rich country on the African continent. Of these, 153 species are considered to be threatened. Nine biomes have been described in South Africa: Fynbos, Succulent Karoo, desert, Nama Karoo, grassland, savanna, Albany thickets, the Indian Ocean coastal belt, and forests.

The 2018 South African National Biodiversity Institute's National Biodiversity Assessment plant checklist lists 35,130 taxa in the phyla Anthocerotophyta (hornworts (6)), Anthophyta (flowering plants (33534)), Bryophyta (mosses (685)), Cycadophyta (cycads (42)), Lycopodiophyta (Lycophytes(45)), Marchantiophyta (liverworts (376)), Pinophyta (conifers (33)), and Pteridophyta (cryptogams (408)).

Two families are represented in the literature. Listed taxa include species, subspecies, varieties, and forms as recorded, some of which have subsequently been allocated to other taxa as synonyms, in which cases the accepted taxon is appended to the listing. Multiple entries under alternative names reflect taxonomic revision over time.

== Begoniaceae ==
Family: Begoniaceae,

=== Begonia ===
Genus Begonia:

- Begonia cucullata Willd. not indigenous, naturalised
- Begonia dregei Otto & A.Dietr. endemic
- Begonia geranioides Hook.f. endemic
- Begonia hirtella Link, not indigenous, naturalised
- Begonia homonyma Steud. endemic
- Begonia sonderiana Irmsch. indigenous
  - Begonia sonderiana Irmsch. var. transgrediens Irmsch. accepted as Begonia sonderiana Irmsch. present
- Begonia sutherlandii Hook.f. indigenous
  - Begonia sutherlandii Hook.f. subsp. sutherlandii, indigenous

== Cucurbitaceae ==
- Family: Cucurbitaceae,

=== Acanthosicyos ===
Genus Acanthosicyos:

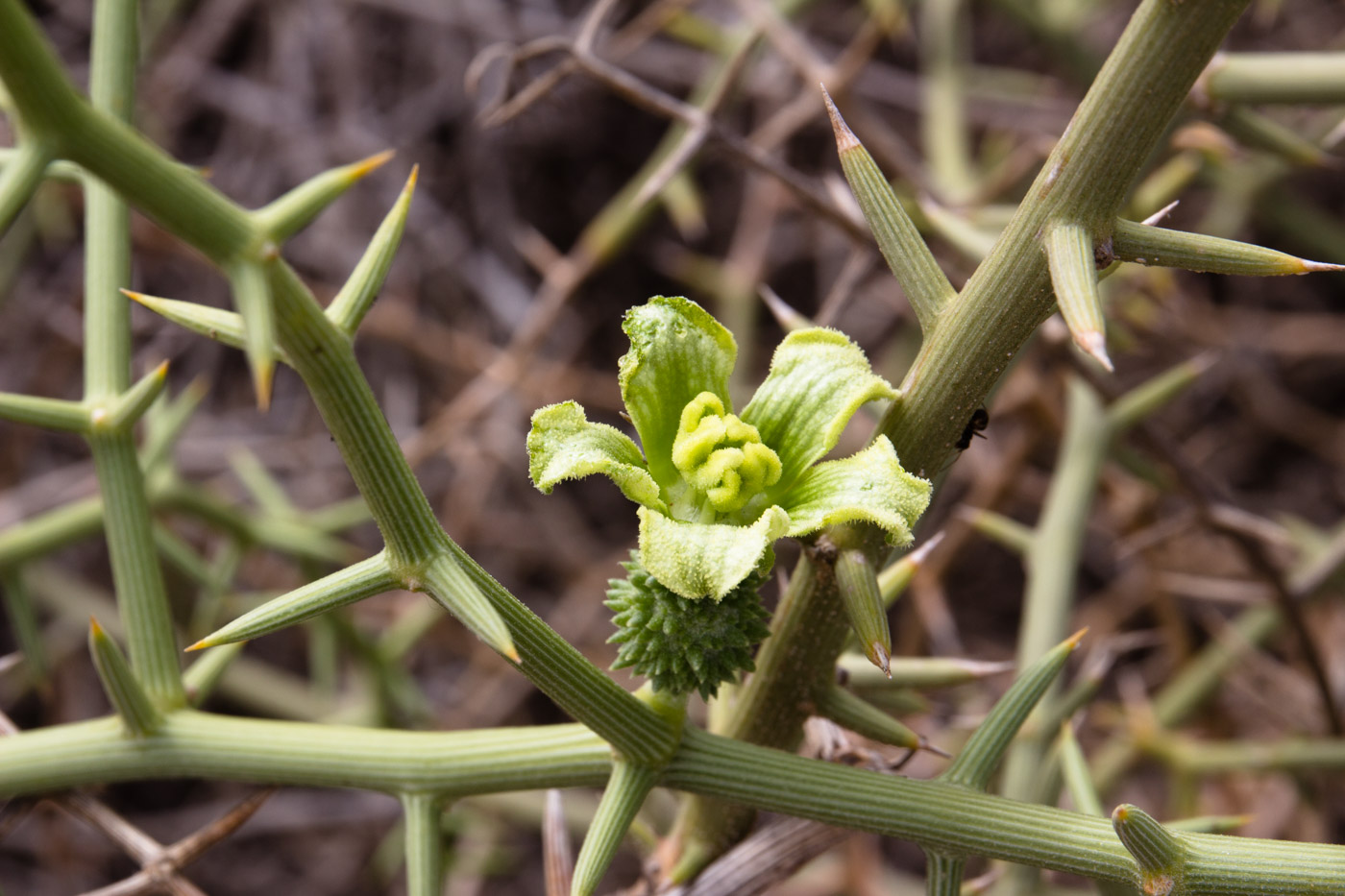

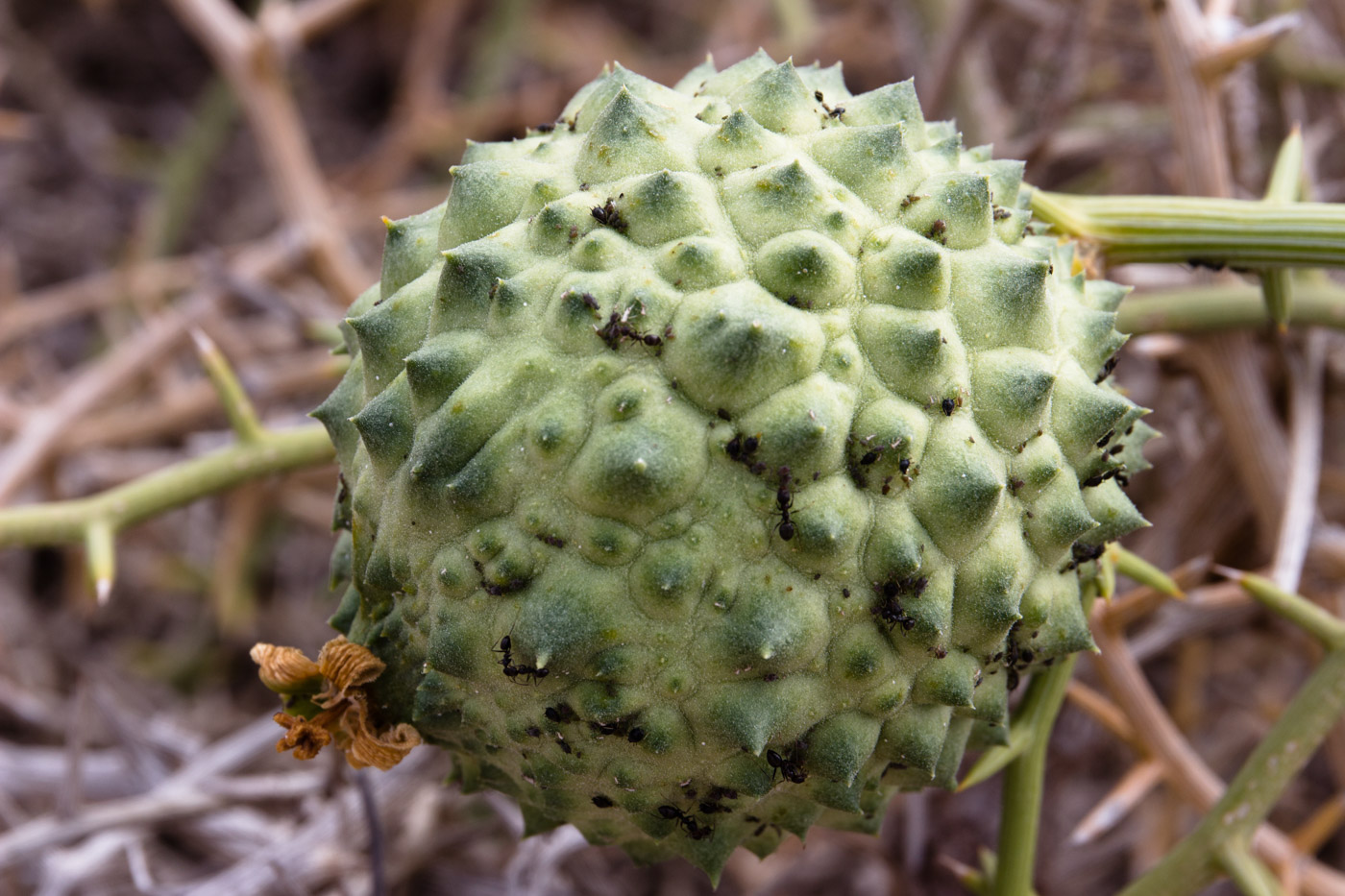
Nara
(Acanthosicyos horridus)

- Acanthosicyos horridus Welw. ex Hook.f. indigenous
- Acanthosicyos naudinianus (Sond.) C.Jeffrey, indigenous

=== Blastania ===
Genus Blastania:

- Blastania cerasiformis (Stocks) A.Meeuse indigenous

=== Citrullus ===
Genus Citrullus:

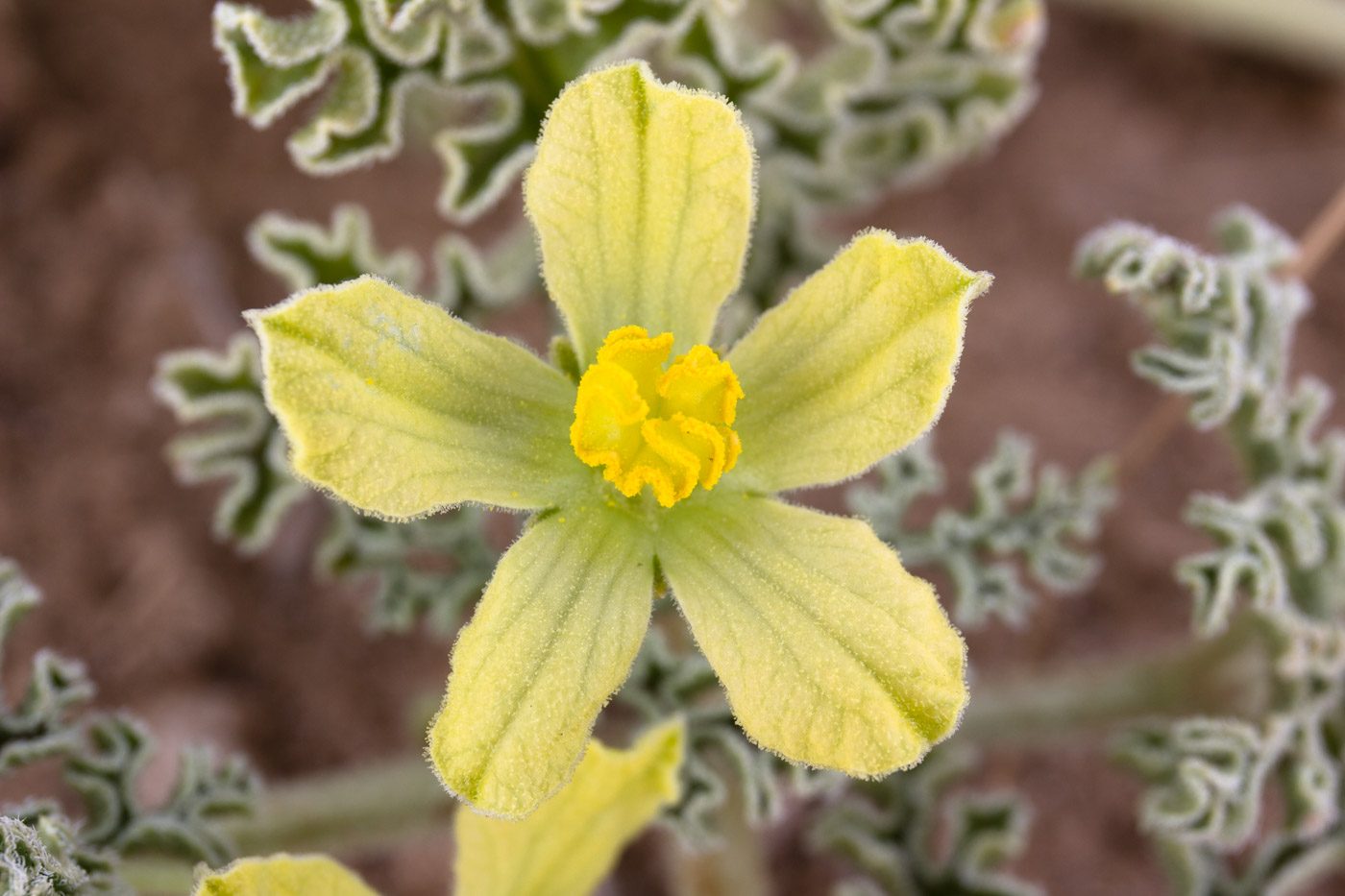

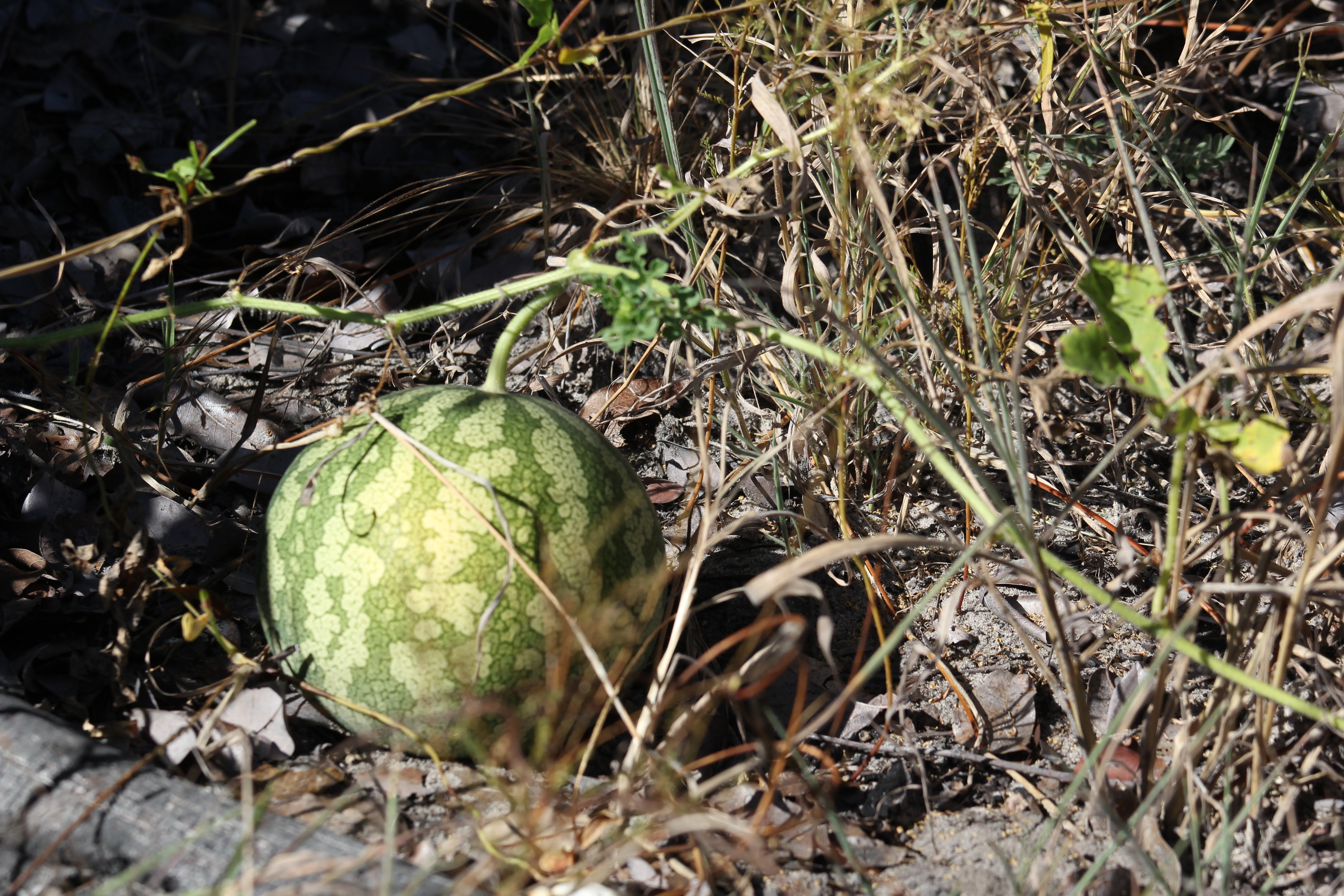
Namib tsamma
(Citrullus ecirrhosus)

- Citrullus ecirrhosus Cogn. indigenous
- Citrullus lanatus (Thunb.) Matsum. & Nakai, indigenous

=== Coccinia ===
Genus Coccinia:

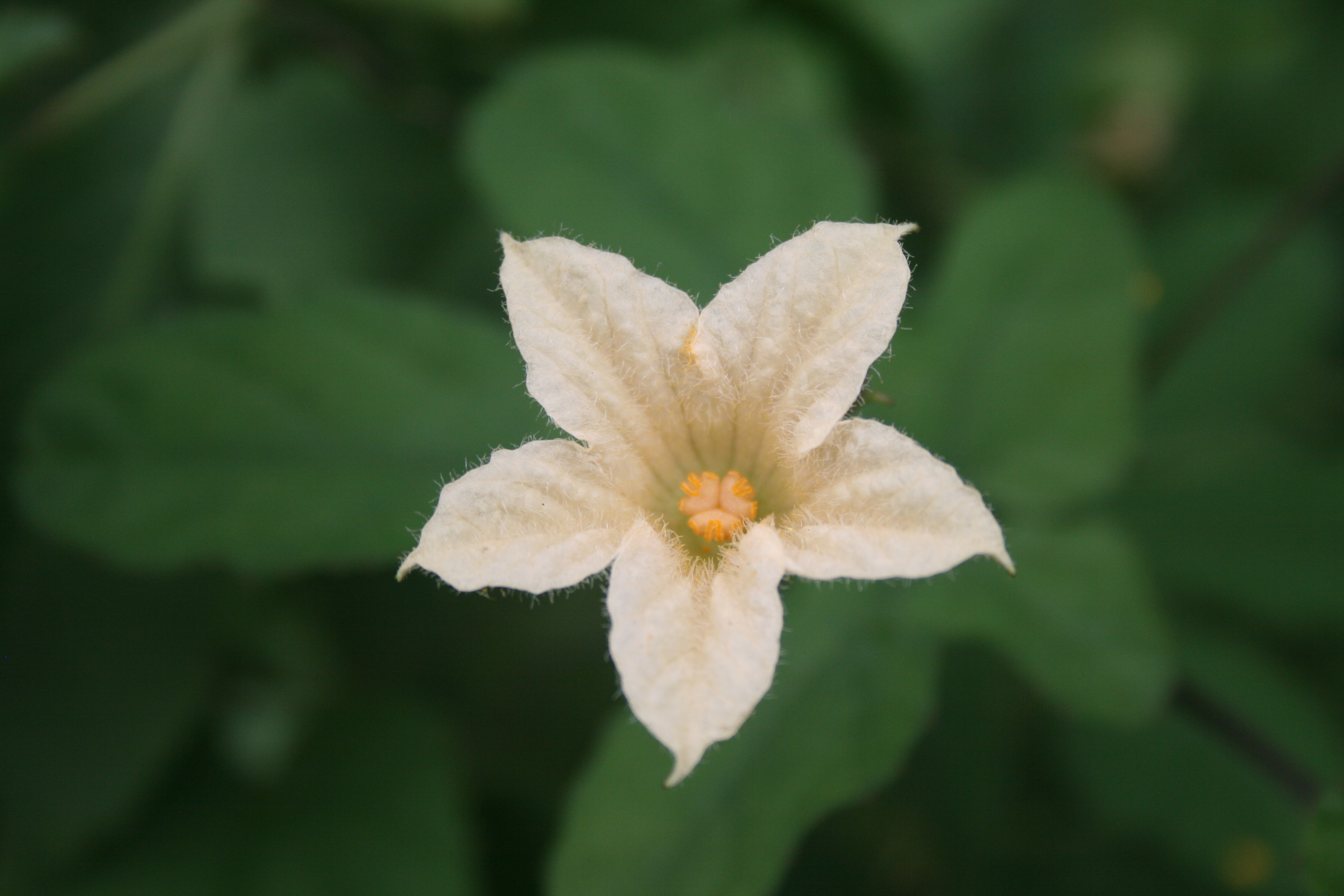

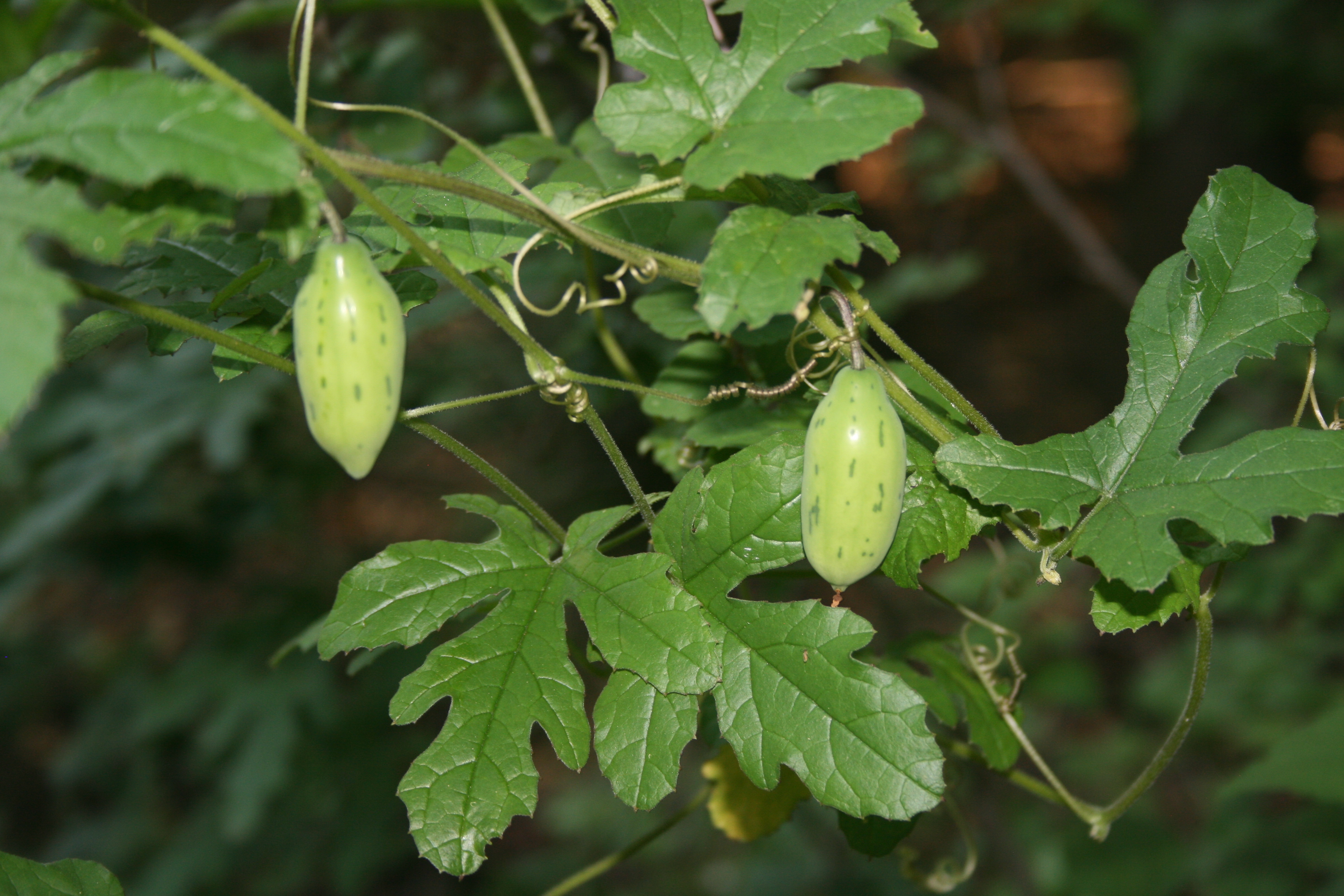
Wild cucumber
(Coccinia mackenii)

- Coccinia adoensis (A.Rich.) Cogn. indigenous
- Coccinia hirtella Cogn. indigenous
- Coccinia mackenii Naudin ex C.Huber, indigenous
- Coccinia palmata (Sond.) Cogn. accepted as Coccinia mackenii Naudin ex C.Huber, present
- Coccinia quinqueloba (Thunb.) Cogn. endemic
- Coccinia rehmannii Cogn. indigenous
- Coccinia sessilifolia (Sond.) Cogn. indigenous
- Coccinia variifolia A.Meeuse, endemic

=== Corallocarpus ===
Genus Corallocarpus:

- Corallocarpus bainesii (Hook.f.) A.Meeuse, indigenous
- Corallocarpus dissectus Cogn. indigenous
- Corallocarpus schinzii Cogn. indigenous
- Corallocarpus triangularis Cogn. indigenous

=== Cucumella ===
Genus Cucumella:

- Cucumella aspera (Cogn.) C.Jeffrey, accepted as Cucumis asper Cogn.
- Cucumella bryoniifolia (Merxm.) C.Jeffrey, accepted as Cucumis bryoniifolius (Merxm.) Ghebret. & Thulin, indigenous
- Cucumella cinerea (Cogn.) C.Jeffrey, accepted as Cucumis cinereus (Cogn.) Ghebret. & Thulin, indigenous
- Cucumella clavipetiolata J.H.Kirkbr. accepted as Cucumis clavipetiolatus (J.H.Kirkbr.) Ghebret. & Thulin

=== Cucumis ===
Genus Cucumis:

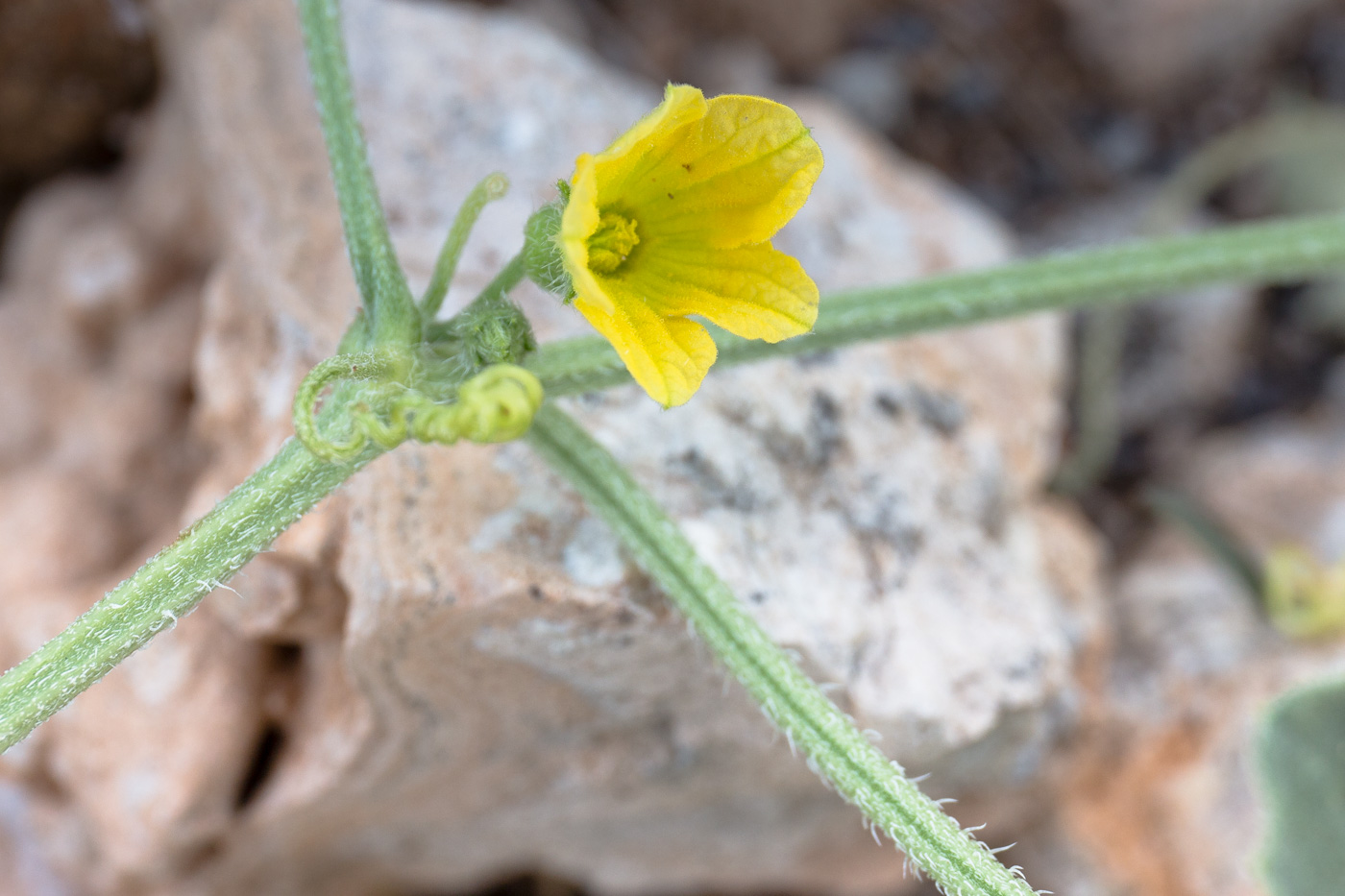

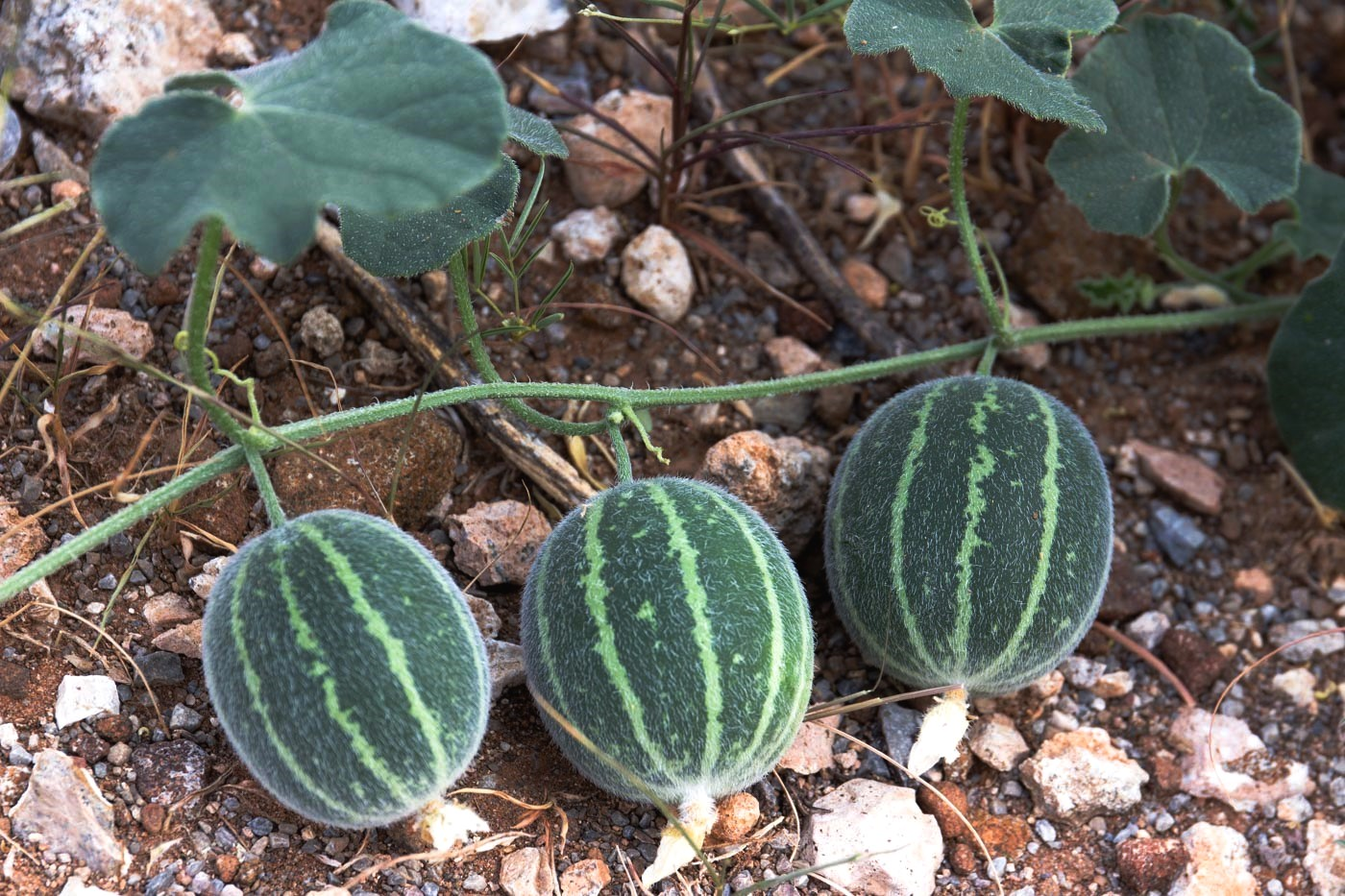
Decorative wild cucumber
(Cucumis sagittatus)

- Cucumis africanus L.f. indigenous
- Cucumis anguria L. indigenous
  - Cucumis anguria L. var. longaculeatus J.H.Kirkbr. indigenous
- Cucumis ficifolius A.Rich., indigenous
- Cucumis heptadactylus Naudin, endemic
- Cucumis hirsutus Sond. indigenous
- Cucumis humifructus Stent, indigenous
- Cucumis kalahariensis A.Meeuse, indigenous
- Cucumis maderaspatanus L. indigenous
- Cucumis meeusei C.Jeffrey, indigenous
- Cucumis melo L. indigenous
  - Cucumis melo L. subsp. agrestis (Naudin) Pangalo, indigenous
  - Cucumis melo L. subsp. melo, indigenous
- Cucumis metuliferus E.Mey. ex Naudin, indigenous
- Cucumis myriocarpus Naudin, indigenous
  - Cucumis myriocarpus Naudin subsp. leptodermis (Schweick.) C.Jeffrey & P.Halliday, indigenous
  - Cucumis myriocarpus Naudin subsp. myriocarpus, indigenous
- Cucumis oreosyce H.Schaef. indigenous
- Cucumis prophetarum L., indigenous
- Cucumis quintanilhae R.Fern. & A.Fern. indigenous
- Cucumis rigidus E.Mey. ex Sond. indigenous
- Cucumis sagittatus Peyr. indigenous
- Cucumis zeyheri Sond. indigenous

=== Diplocyclos ===
Genus Diplocyclos:

- Diplocyclos palmatus (L.) C.Jeffrey, not indigenous, naturalised, invasive

=== Gerrardanthus ===
Genus Gerrardanthus:

- Gerrardanthus macrorhizus Harv. ex Hook.f. indigenous
- Gerrardanthus tomentosus Hook.f. endemic

=== Kedrostis ===
Genus Kedrostis:

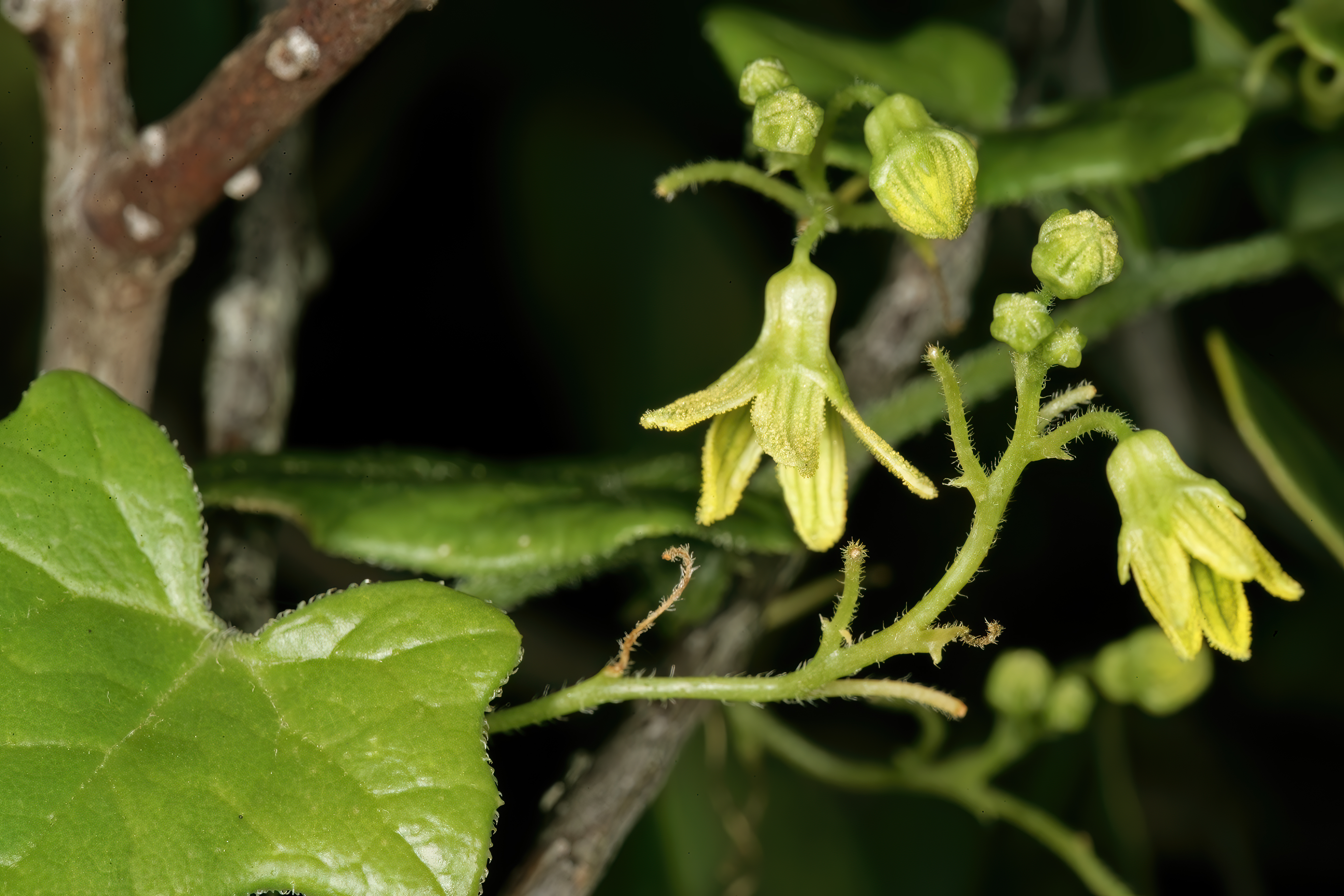
Kedrostis nana

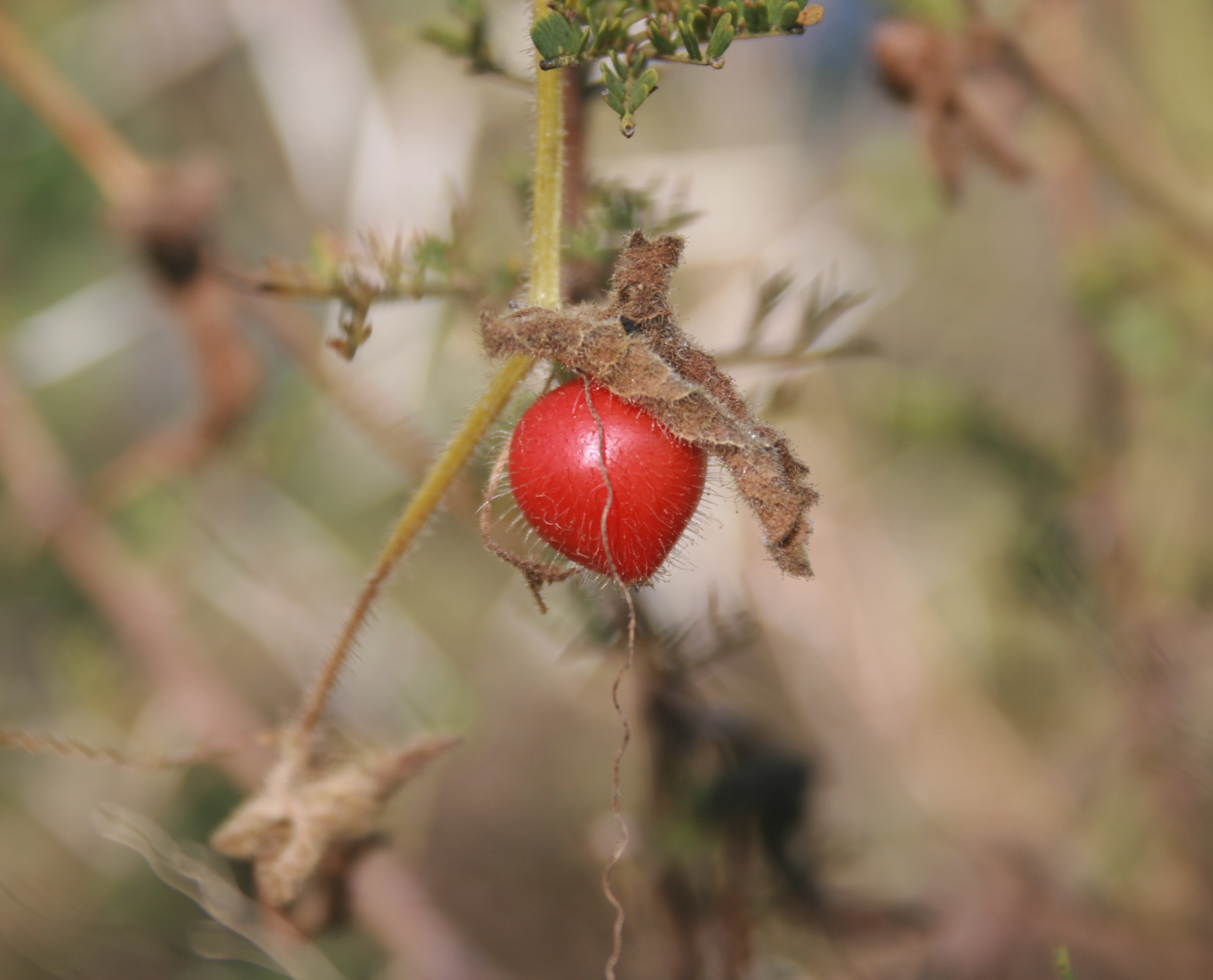
Kedrostis foetidissima

- Kedrostis africana (L.) Cogn. indigenous
- Kedrostis capensis (Sond.) A.Meeuse, indigenous
- Kedrostis crassirostrata Bremek. indigenous
- Kedrostis foetidissima (Jacq.) Cogn. indigenous
- Kedrostis hirtella (Naudin) Cogn. accepted as Kedrostis leloja (Forssk.) C.Jeffrey, indigenous
- Kedrostis leloja (Forssk.) C.Jeffrey, indigenous
- Kedrostis limpompensis C.Jeffrey, accepted as Kedrostis limpopoensis C.Jeffrey, present
- Kedrostis limpopoensis C.Jeffrey, indigenous
- Kedrostis nana (Lam.) Cogn. indigenous
  - Kedrostis nana (Lam.) Cogn. var. nana, endemic
  - Kedrostis nana (Lam.) Cogn. var. schlechteri (Cogn.) A.Meeuse, endemic
  - Kedrostis nana (Lam.) Cogn. var. zeyheri (Schrad.) A.Meeuse, endemic
- Kedrostis psammophylla Bruyns, endemic

=== Lagenaria ===
Genus Lagenaria:

- Lagenaria siceraria (Molina) Standl. indigenous
- Lagenaria sphaerica (Sond.) Naudin, indigenous

=== Momordica ===
Genus Momordica:

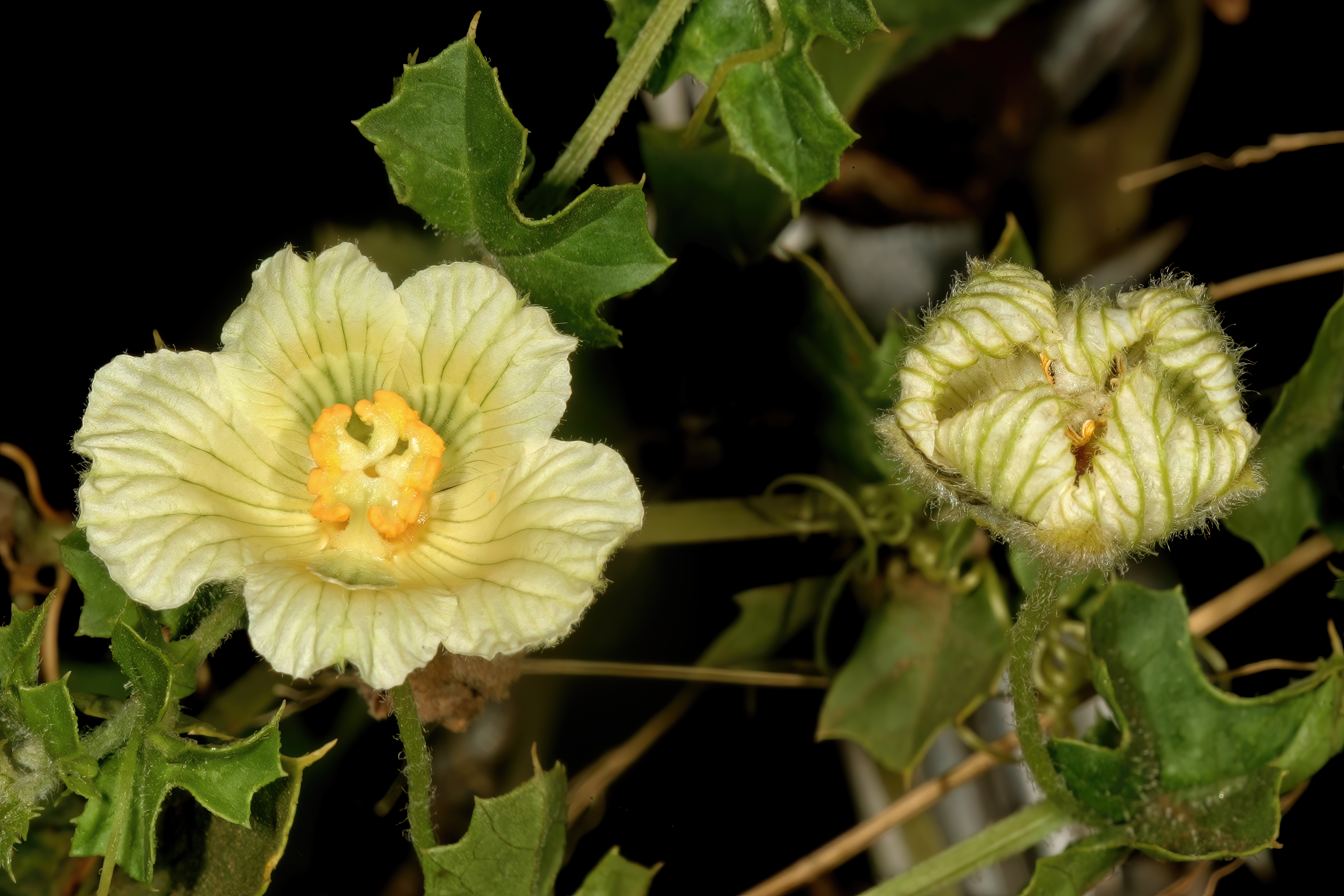

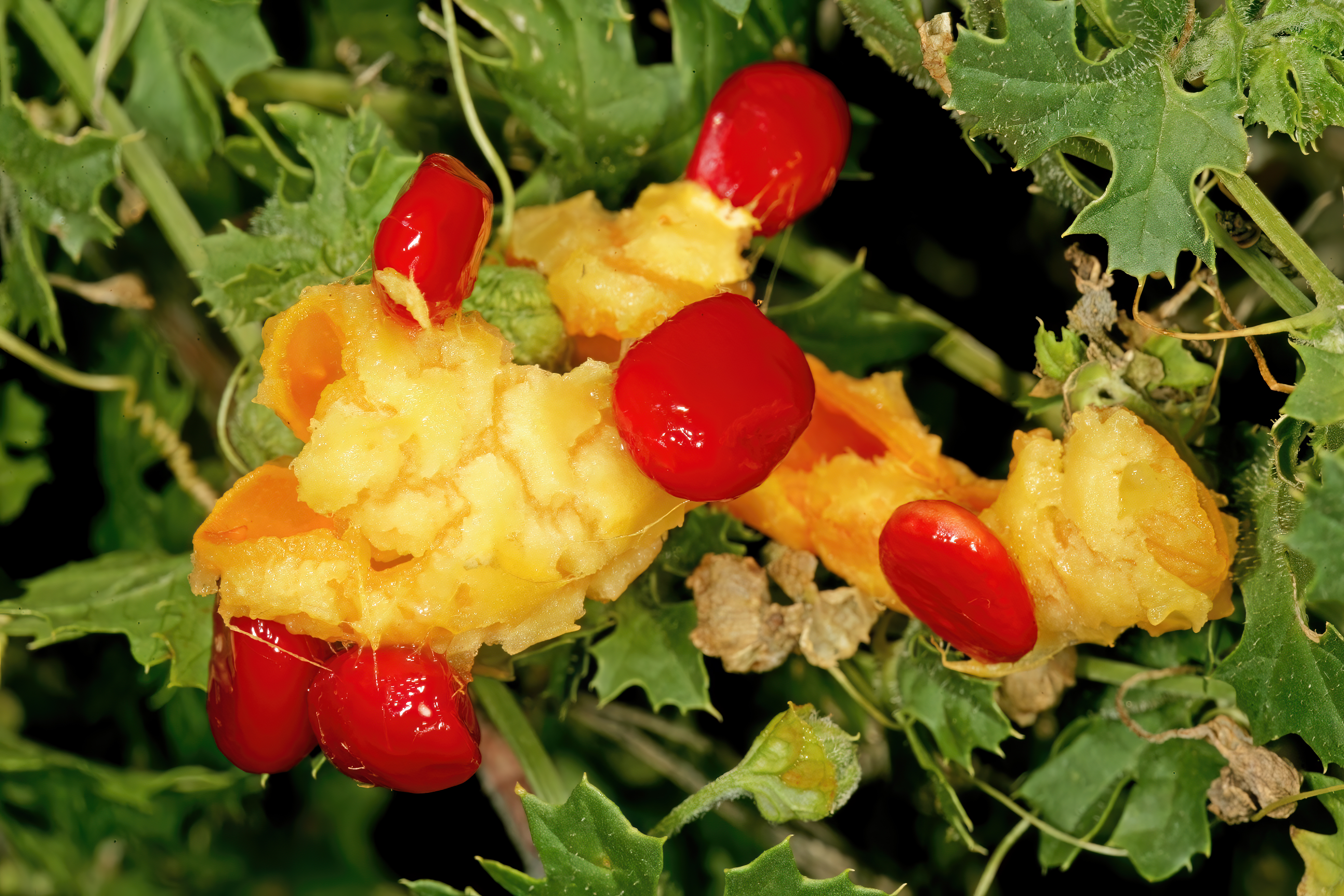
Southern balsampear
(Momordica balsamina)

- Momordica balsamina L. indigenous
- Momordica boivinii Baill. indigenous
- Momordica cardiospermoides Klotzsch, indigenous
- Momordica charantia L. not indigenous, naturalised
- Momordica foetida Schumach. indigenous
- Momordica repens Bremek. indigenous

=== Mukia ===
Genus Mukia:

- Mukia maderaspatana (L.) M.Roem. accepted as Cucumis maderaspatanus L. indigenous

=== Oreosyce ===
Genus Oreosyce:

- Oreosyce africana Hook.f., indigenous

=== Peponium ===
Genus Peponium:

- Peponium caledonicum (Sond.) Engl. indigenous
- Peponium mackenii (Naudin) Engl. endemic

=== Trochomeria ===
Genus Trochomeria:

- Trochomeria debilis (Sond.) Hook.f. indigenous
- Trochomeria hookeri Harv. indigenous
- Trochomeria macrocarpa (Sond.) Hook.f. indigenous
  - Trochomeria macrocarpa (Sond.) Hook.f. subsp. macrocarpa, indigenous
- Trochomeria sagittata (Harv. ex Sond.) Cogn. indigenous

=== Zehneria ===
Genus Zehneria:

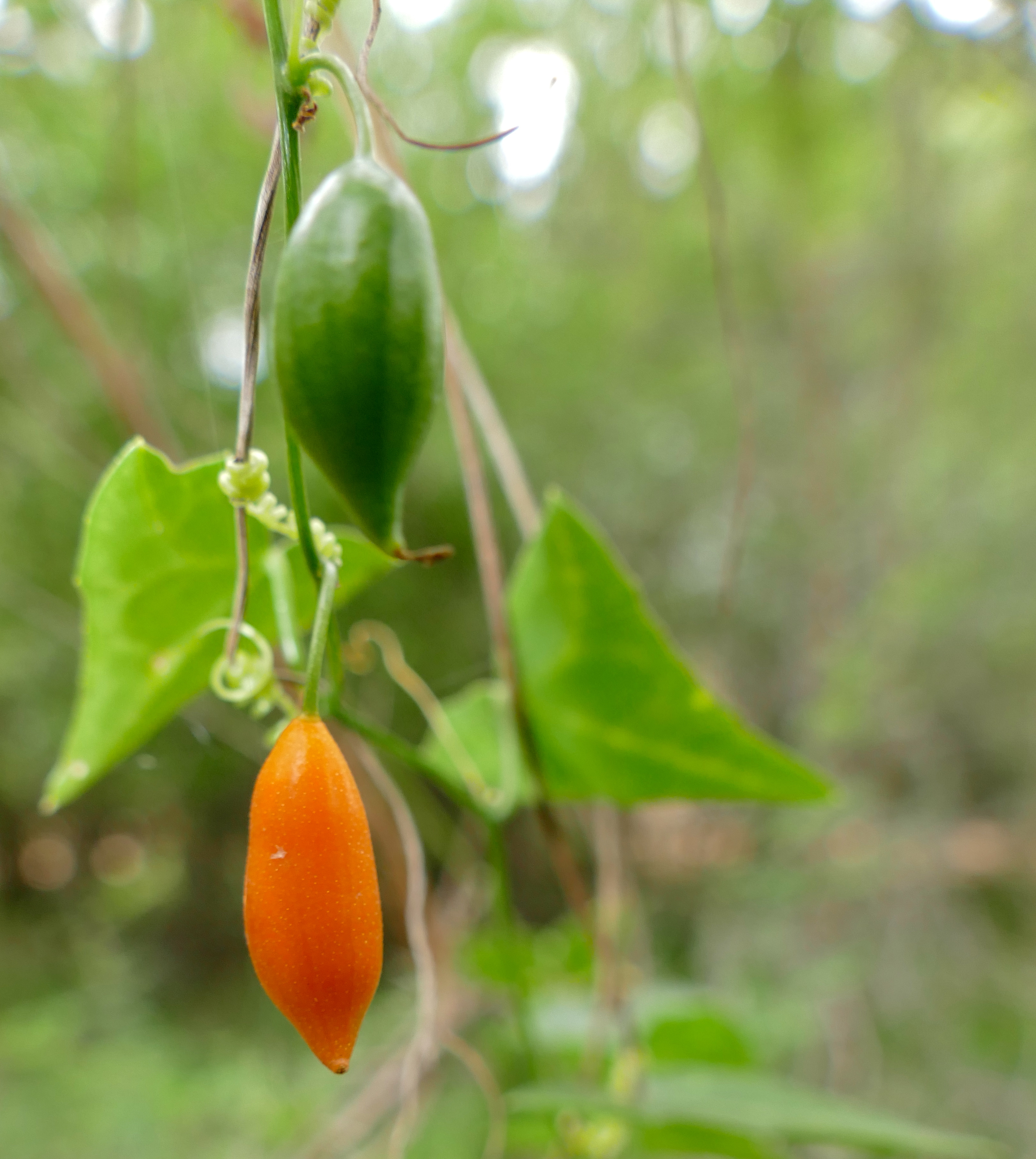
Wild cucumber
(Zehneria thwaitesii)

- Zehneria marlothii (Cogn.) R.Fern. & A.Fern. (synonym Pilogyne marlothii (Cogn.) W.J.de Wilde & Duyfjes), indigenous
- Zehneria parvifolia (Cogn.) J.H.Ross (synonym Pilogyne parvifolia (Cogn.) W.J.de Wilde & Duyfjes), indigenous
- Zehneria scabra (L.f.) Sond. subsp. scabra (synonym as Pilogyne scabra (L.f.) W.J.de Wilde & Duyfjes), indigenous
