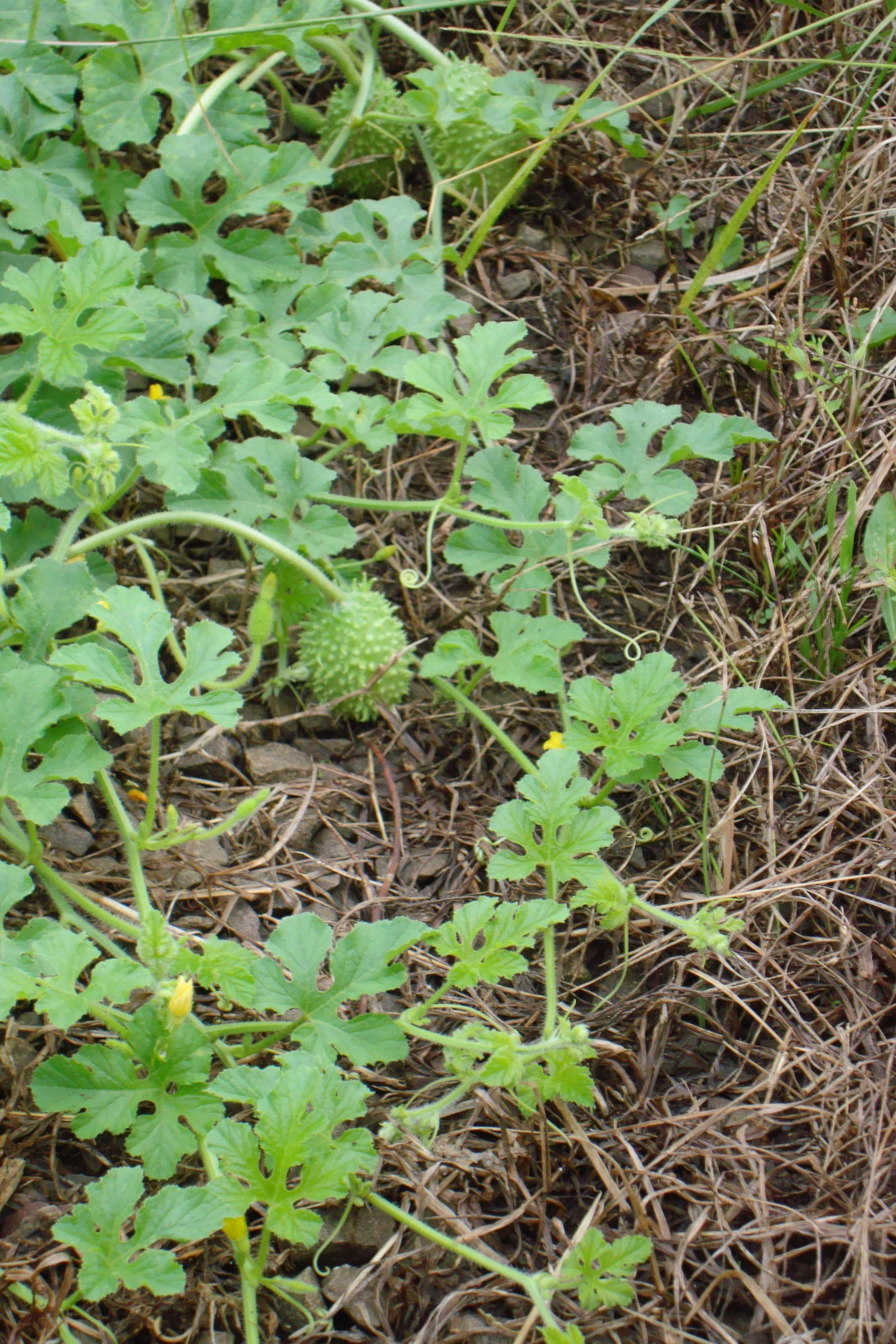
- Cucumis anguria

Scientific classification
- Kingdom: Plantae
- Clade: Tracheophytes
- Clade: Angiosperms
- Clade: Eudicots
- Clade: Rosids
- Order: Cucurbitales
- Family: Cucurbitaceae
- Subfamily: Cucurbitoideae
- Tribe: Benincaseae; Ser. (1825)

Genera
- Around 26; see text

= Benincaseae =

Tribe of rosids in the family Cucurbitaceae

Benincaseae is one of 15 tribes in the family Cucurbitaceae.

== Subtribes and genera ==
Benincaseae consists of at least one subtribe, 26 genera, and over 200 species.

- Benincasinae
  - Acanthosicyos Welw. ex Benth. & Hook.f.
  - Benincasa Savi (synonym Praecitrullus Pangalo)
  - Citrullus Schrad.
  - Coccinia Wight & Arn.
  - Diplocyclos (Endl.) Post & Kuntze
  - Lagenaria Ser.
  - Lemurosicyos Keraudren
  - Raphidiocystis Hook.f.
  - Ruthalicia C.Jeffrey

Other:

- Blastania Kotschy & Peyr. (synonym Ctenolepis Hook.f.)
- Borneosicyos W.J.de Wilde
- Cephalopentandra Chiov.
- Cucumis L.
- Dactyliandra (Hook.f.) Hook.f.
- Indomelothria W.J.de Wilde & Duyfjes
- Khmeriosicyos W.J.de Wilde & Duyfjes
- Melothria L.
- Muellerargia Cogn.
- Oreosyce Hook.f.
- Papuasicyos Duyfjes
- Peponium Engl.
- Scopellaria W.J.de Wilde & Duyfjes
- Solena Lour.
- Trochomeria Hook.f.
- Zehneria Endl.
