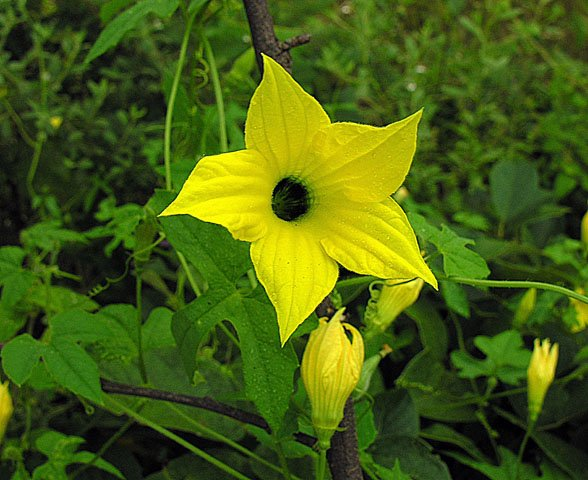
- Schizocarpum parviflorum

Scientific classification
- Kingdom: Plantae
- Clade: Tracheophytes
- Clade: Angiosperms
- Clade: Eudicots
- Clade: Rosids
- Order: Cucurbitales
- Family: Cucurbitaceae
- Subfamily: Cucurbitoideae
- Tribe: Cucurbiteae
- Genus: Schizocarpum; Schrad.

= Schizocarpum =

Genus of flowering plants

Schizocarpum is a genus of nine accepted species of flowering plants of the family Cucurbitaceae. It is native to Mexico and Central America.

== Selected species ==
The nine accepted species are:

- Schizocarpum dieterleae
- Schizocarpum filiforme
- Schizocarpum liebmannii
- Schizocarpum longisepalum
- Schizocarpum palmeri
- Schizocarpum parviflorum
- Schizocarpum pilosum
- Schizocarpum reflexum
- Schizocarpum tripodum
