= Cucumis trilobatus =

Cucumis trilobatus may refer to one of two separate species:

- Cucumis ficifolius (Cucumis trilobatus Forssk)
- Cyclanthera pedata (Cucumis trilobatus L.)
