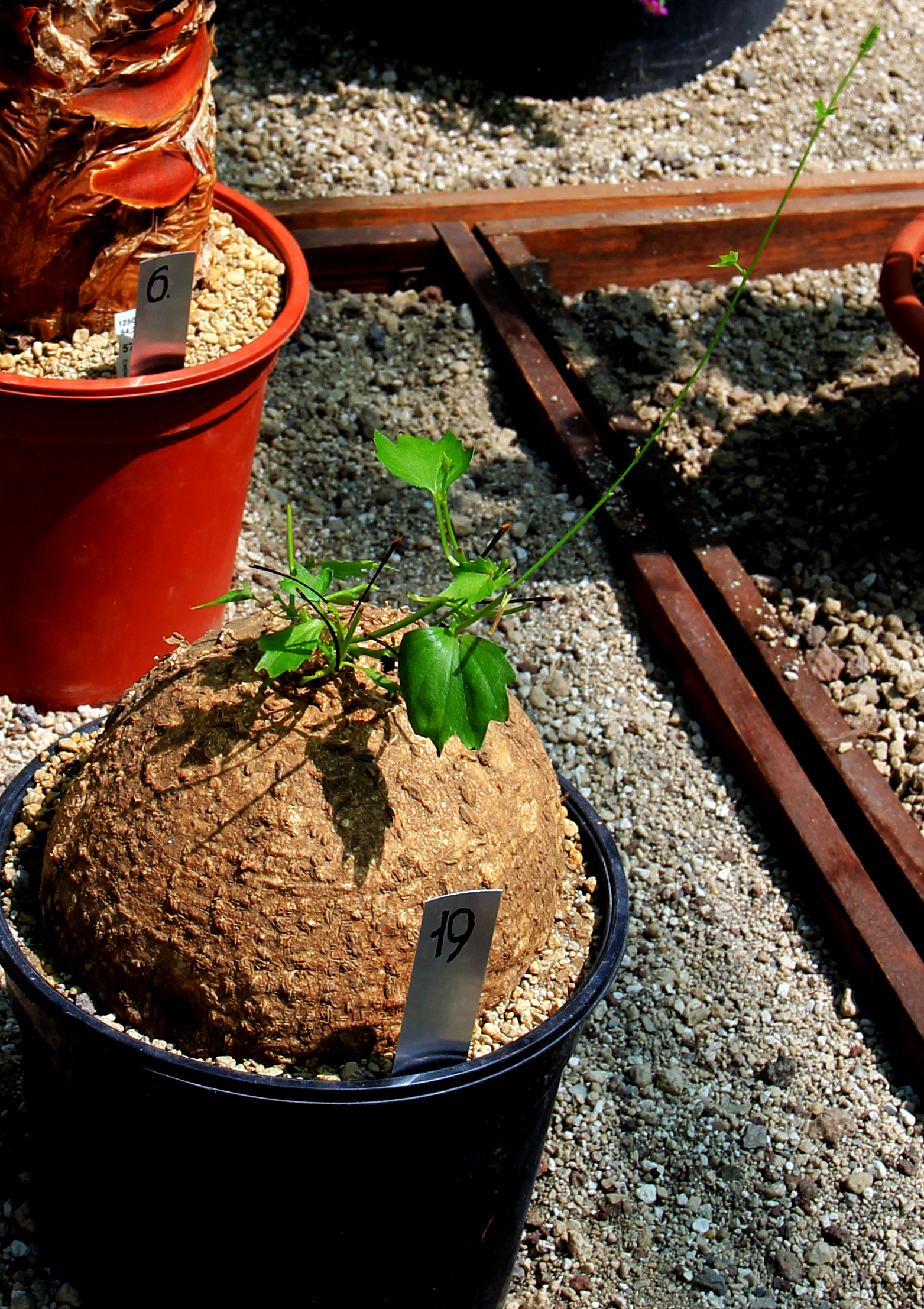
- Trochomeria macrocarpa

Scientific classification
- Kingdom: Plantae
- Clade: Tracheophytes
- Clade: Angiosperms
- Clade: Eudicots
- Clade: Rosids
- Order: Cucurbitales
- Family: Cucurbitaceae
- Subfamily: Cucurbitoideae
- Tribe: Benincaseae
- Genus: Trochomeria; Hook.f.

= Trochomeria =

Genus of flowering plants

Trochomeria is a genus of flowering plants belonging to the family Cucurbitaceae.

Its native range is Tropical and Southern Africa.

Species:

- Trochomeria baumiana Gilg
- Trochomeria debilis (Sond.) Hook.f.
- Trochomeria hookeri Harv.
- Trochomeria macrocarpa (Sond.) Harv.
- Trochomeria nigrescens (C.Jeffrey) H.Schaef.
- Trochomeria polymorpha (Welw.) Cogn.
- Trochomeria sagittata (Harv.) Cogn.
- Trochomeria stefaninii (Chiov.) C.Jeffrey
- Trochomeria subglabra C.Jeffrey
