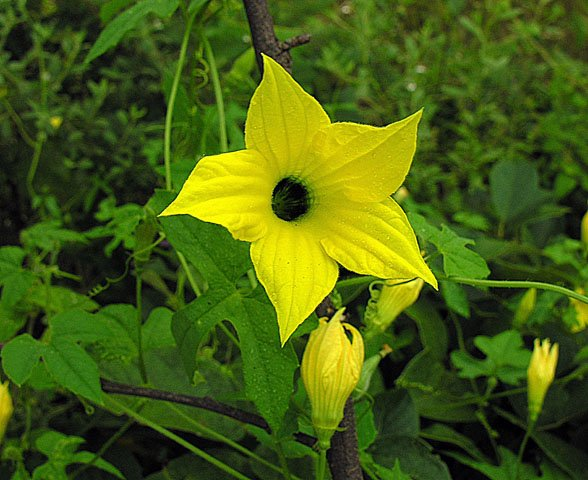

Scientific classification
- Kingdom: Plantae
- Clade: Embryophytes
- Clade: Tracheophytes
- Clade: Angiosperms
- Clade: Eudicots
- Clade: Rosids
- Order: Cucurbitales
- Family: Cucurbitaceae
- Genus: Schizocarpum
- Species: S. parviflorum

Binomial name
- Schizocarpum parviflorum B.L.Rob. & Greenm.

= Schizocarpum parviflorum =

Species of flowering plant

Schizocarpum parviflorum is a species of plant in the genus Schizocarpum. It is native to several parts of Mexico.
