= Corallocarpus elegans =

Scientific classification
- Kingdom: Plantae
- Clade: Tracheophytes
- Clade: Angiosperms
- Clade: Eudicots
- Clade: Rosids
- Order: Cucurbitales
- Family: Cucurbitaceae
- Genus: Corallocarpus
- Species: C. elegans

Binomial name
- Corallocarpus elegans Gilg, 1904

Species of flowering plant

Corallocarpus elegans is a species of plants in the family Cucurbitaceae. It is found in Africa.
