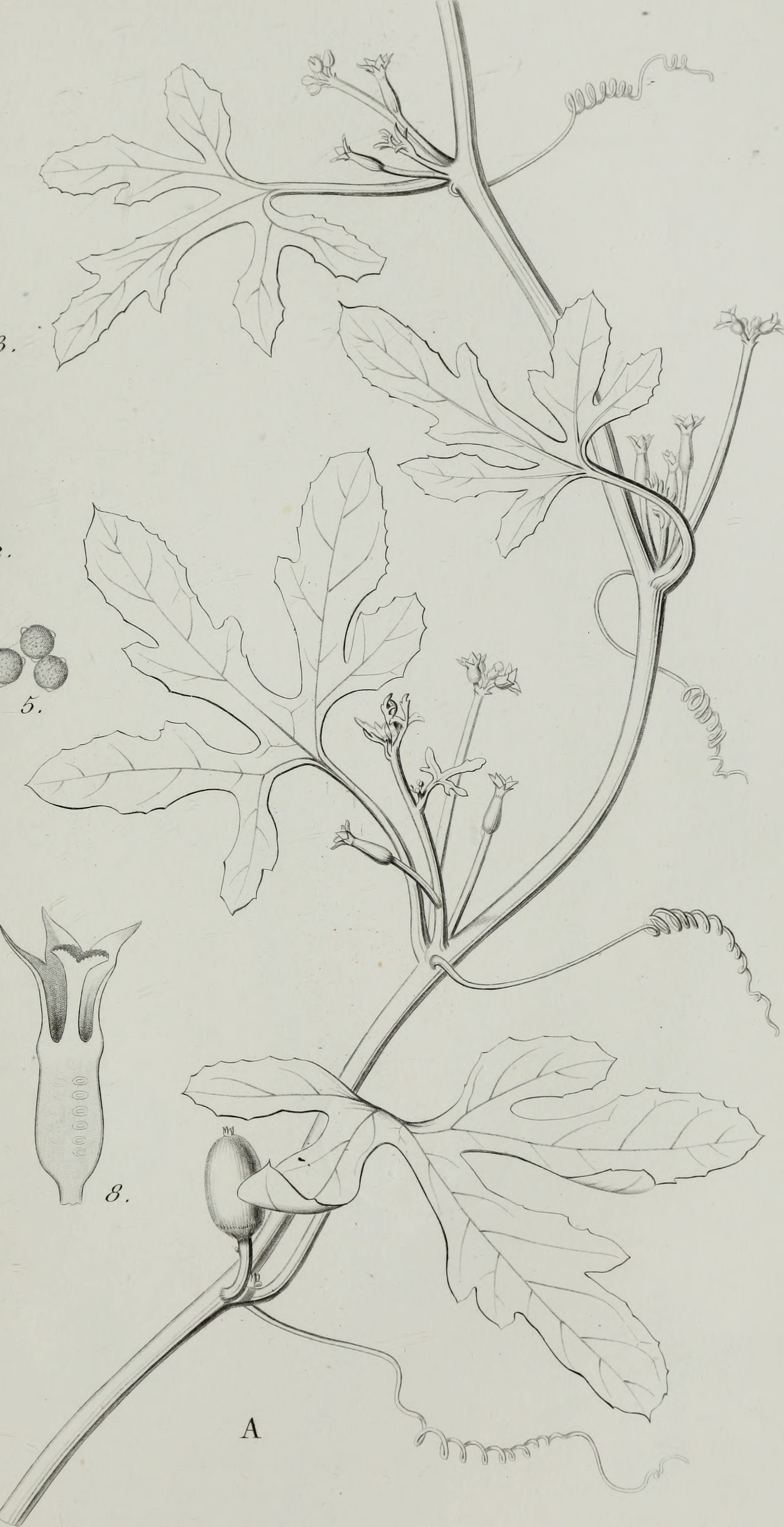
- Corallocarpus welwitschii (illustration in Annales des Sciences Naturelles Botaniques, 1862)

Scientific classification
- Kingdom: Plantae
- Clade: Tracheophytes
- Clade: Angiosperms
- Clade: Eudicots
- Clade: Rosids
- Order: Cucurbitales
- Family: Cucurbitaceae
- Subfamily: Cucurbitoideae
- Tribe: Coniandreae
- Genus: Corallocarpus; Welw. ex Benth. & Hook.f., 1867

Species
- Corallocarpus bainesii; Corallocarpus boehmii; Corallocarpus conocarpus; Corallocarpus dissectus; Corallocarpus elegans; Corallocarpus ellipticus; Corallocarpus epigaeus; Corallocarpus grevei; Corallocarpus palmatus; Corallocarpus parvifolius; Corallocarpus perrieri; Corallocarpus poissonii; Corallocarpus schimperi; Corallocarpus schinzii; Corallocarpus tenuissimus; Corallocarpus triangularis; Corallocarpus welwitschii (type)

Synonyms
- Anguriopsis J. R. Johnst.; Calyptrosicyos Keraudren; Doyerea Grosourdy

= Corallocarpus =

Genus of flowering plants

Corallocarpus is a genus of succulent plants in the family Cucurbitaceae.
