= Nhandiroboideae =

Scientific classification
- Kingdom: Plantae
- Clade: Tracheophytes
- Clade: Angiosperms
- Clade: Eudicots
- Clade: Rosids
- Order: Cucurbitales
- Family: Cucurbitaceae
- Subfamily: Nhandiroboideae; Kostel.

Synonyms
- Fevilleoideae; Zanonioideae

Subfamily of flowering plants

The Nhandiroboideae are a subfamily comprising a paraphyletic basal group of genera in the Cucurbitaceae, or gourd family, of flowering plants. The Nhandiroboideae comprise all members of the Cucurbitaceae that do not belong to the Cucurbitoideae. Alternative names for the subfamily are Fevilleoideae and Zanonioideae. Because the subfamily is not monophyletic, unlike the Cucurbitoideae, a division of the family only to tribal level has been preferred.
