= Oreosyce =

Scientific classification
- Kingdom: Plantae
- Clade: Tracheophytes
- Clade: Angiosperms
- Clade: Eudicots
- Clade: Rosids
- Order: Cucurbitales
- Family: Cucurbitaceae
- Subfamily: Cucurbitoideae
- Tribe: Benincaseae
- Genus: Oreosyce; Hook.f. (1871)
- Species: O. africana

Binomial name
- Oreosyce africana Hook.f. (1871)

Synonyms
- Synonymy =: Hymenosicyos Chiov. (1911); Cucumis cecilii N.E.Br. (1906); Cucumis membranifolius Hook.f. (1871); Cucumis oreosyce H.Schaef. (2007); Cucumis parvifolius Cogn. ex Scott Elliot (1891); Cucumis subsericeus Hook.f. (1871); Hymenosicyos bequaertii (De Wild.) Harms (1924); Hymenosicyos membranifolius (Hook.f.) Chiov. (1911); Hymenosicyos parviflorus (Cogn.) Harms (1923); Hymenosicyos subsericeus (Hook.f.) Harms (1923); Hymenosicyos triangularis (Cogn.) Harms (1923); Hymenosicyos villosus (Cogn.) Harms (1923); Oreosyce bequaertii De Wild. (1921); Oreosyce holstii Cogn. ex Engl. (1895); Oreosyce parvifolia Cogn. (1916); Oreosyce subsericea (Hook.f.) A.Meeuse (1962); Oreosyce triangularis Cogn. (1895); Oreosyce villosa Cogn. (1916); Peponia parviflora Cogn. (1895); Peponium parviflorum (Cogn.) Engl. (1897)

Genus of flowering plants

Oreosyce africana is a species of flowering plant in the cucumber family, Cucurbitaceae. It is the sole species in genus Oreosyce. It is a climber native to sub-Saharan Africa and Madagascar, ranging from Bioko and Cameroon to the west to Ethiopia to the northeast and Limpopo Province of South Africa to the south.
