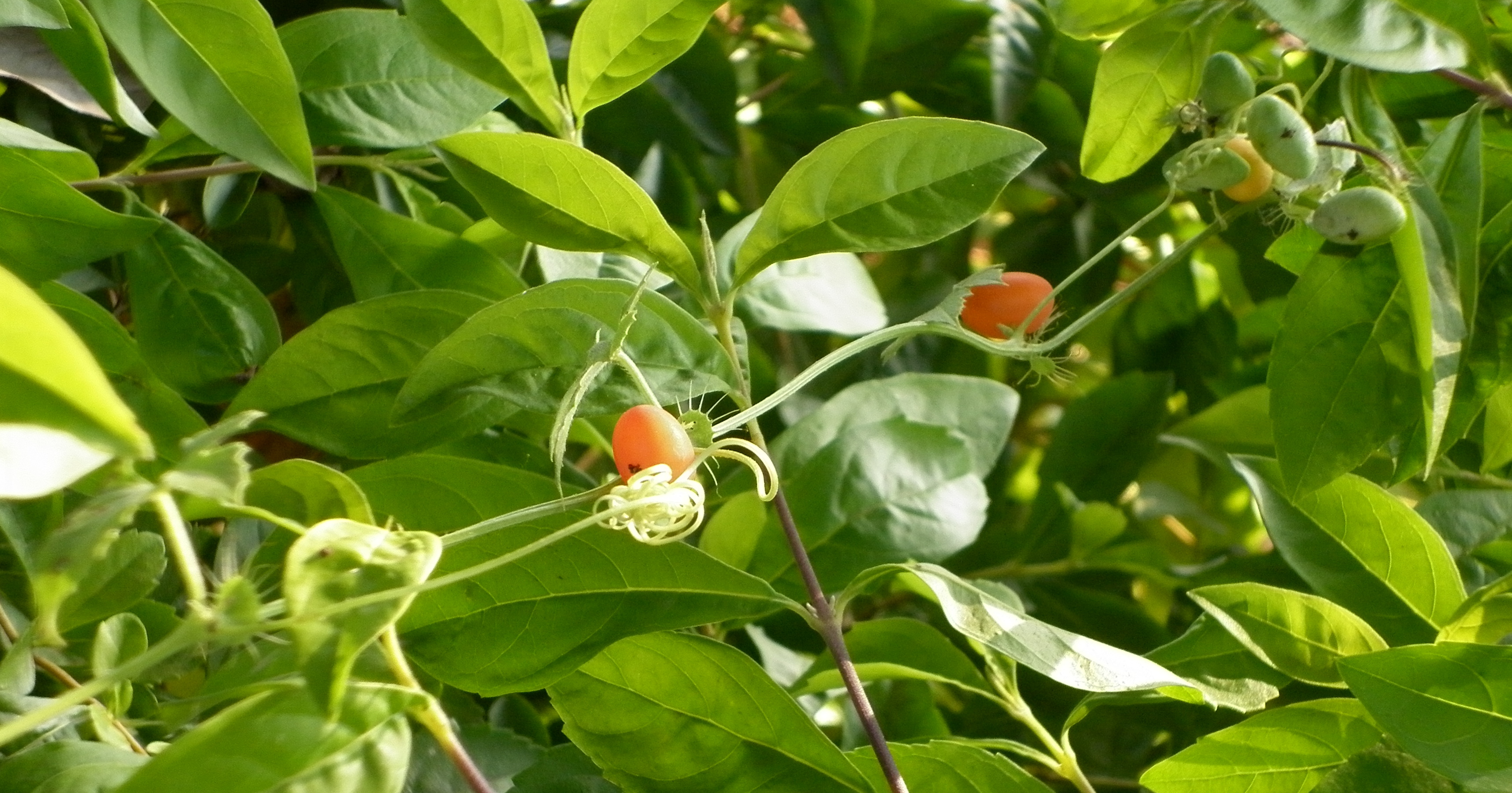

Scientific classification
- Kingdom: Plantae
- Clade: Tracheophytes
- Clade: Angiosperms
- Clade: Eudicots
- Clade: Rosids
- Order: Cucurbitales
- Family: Cucurbitaceae
- Genus: Blastania
- Species: B. garcinii

Binomial name
- Blastania garcinii (Burm.f.) Cogn. (1881)

Synonyms
- Bryonia agrestis Raeusch. (1797); Bryonia garcinii (Burm.f.) Willd. (1805); Bryonia reniformis Roxb. ex Wight & Arn. (1834); Bryonia stipulacea Willd. (1805); Bryonia triloba Lour. (1790); Ctenolepis garcinii (Burm.f.) C.B.Clarke (1879); Ctenopsis garcinii (Burm.f.) Naudin (1866); Pilogyne garcinii Wight (1843); Sicyos garcinii Burm.f. (1768) (basionym); Zehneria garcinii (Burm.f.) Stocks (1852)

= Blastania garcinii =

Species of flowering plant

Blastania garcinii, also known as Garcin's bur cucumber, is a tender climber of the family Cucurbitaceae. It is one of the three species of the genus Blastania. The species was named after French botanist Laurent Garcin, who traveled India in the 18th century.

== Description ==
It is a climbing vine with three to five lobed palmate leaves. Large stipule-like bracts with cilliate margins are found on the axils of the leaves and fruits. It is a monoecious plant with male flowers in raceme inflorescences and female flowers solitary. Fruits are borne in the months of December to January. Fruit is sub-reniform, glabrous, possessing one to two oblong seeds. Leaves span 1 to 4 cm in length.
