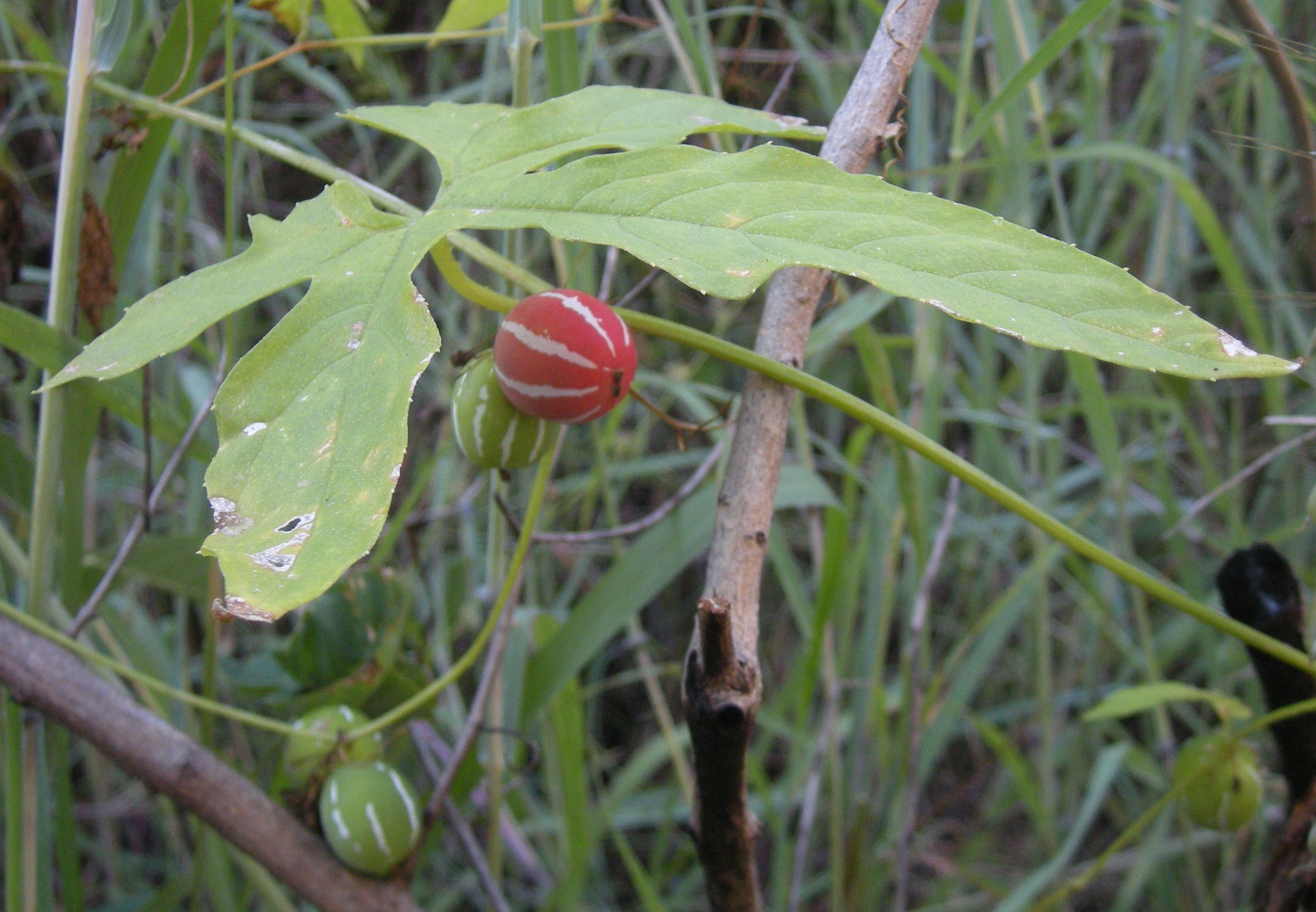
- Diplocyclos palmatus

Scientific classification
- Kingdom: Plantae
- Clade: Tracheophytes
- Clade: Angiosperms
- Clade: Eudicots
- Clade: Rosids
- Order: Cucurbitales
- Family: Cucurbitaceae
- Subfamily: Cucurbitoideae
- Tribe: Benincaseae
- Genus: Diplocyclos (Endl.) T. Post & Kuntze

= Diplocyclos =

Genus of flowering plants

Diplocyclos is a genus of climbing or trailing vine in the family Cucurbitaceae. The genus comprises four or five species. D. palmatus is pantropical in distribution and the remainder of species are restricted to Africa. All species are found within rainforest and the moister woodland types.

Diployclos is characterised by simple, palmately lobed leaves and dioecious flowers, with male and female flowers in axillary sessile clusters or racemes. Diplocylos produce fleshy, globular fruit with distinct striped or spotted patterns. All parts of the plant are toxic in large quantities, however the leaves are eaten in small quantities as a vegetable in some parts of the world. The leaves and fruits are also used for medicinal purposes.

== Species ==
- Diplocyclos decipiens
- Diplocyclos leiocarpus
- Diplocyclos palmatus
- Diplocyclos schliebenii
- Diplocyclos tenuis

== Sources ==
- http://plantnet.rbgsyd.nsw.gov.au/cgi-bin/NSWfl.pl?page=nswfl&lvl=gn&name=Diplocyclos
- http://www.theplantlist.org/browse/A/Cucurbitaceae/Diplocyclos/
- https://books.google.com/books?id=6jrlyOPfr24C&pg=PA289
- http://www.biomedcentral.com/content/pdf/1471-2148-11-28.pdf
