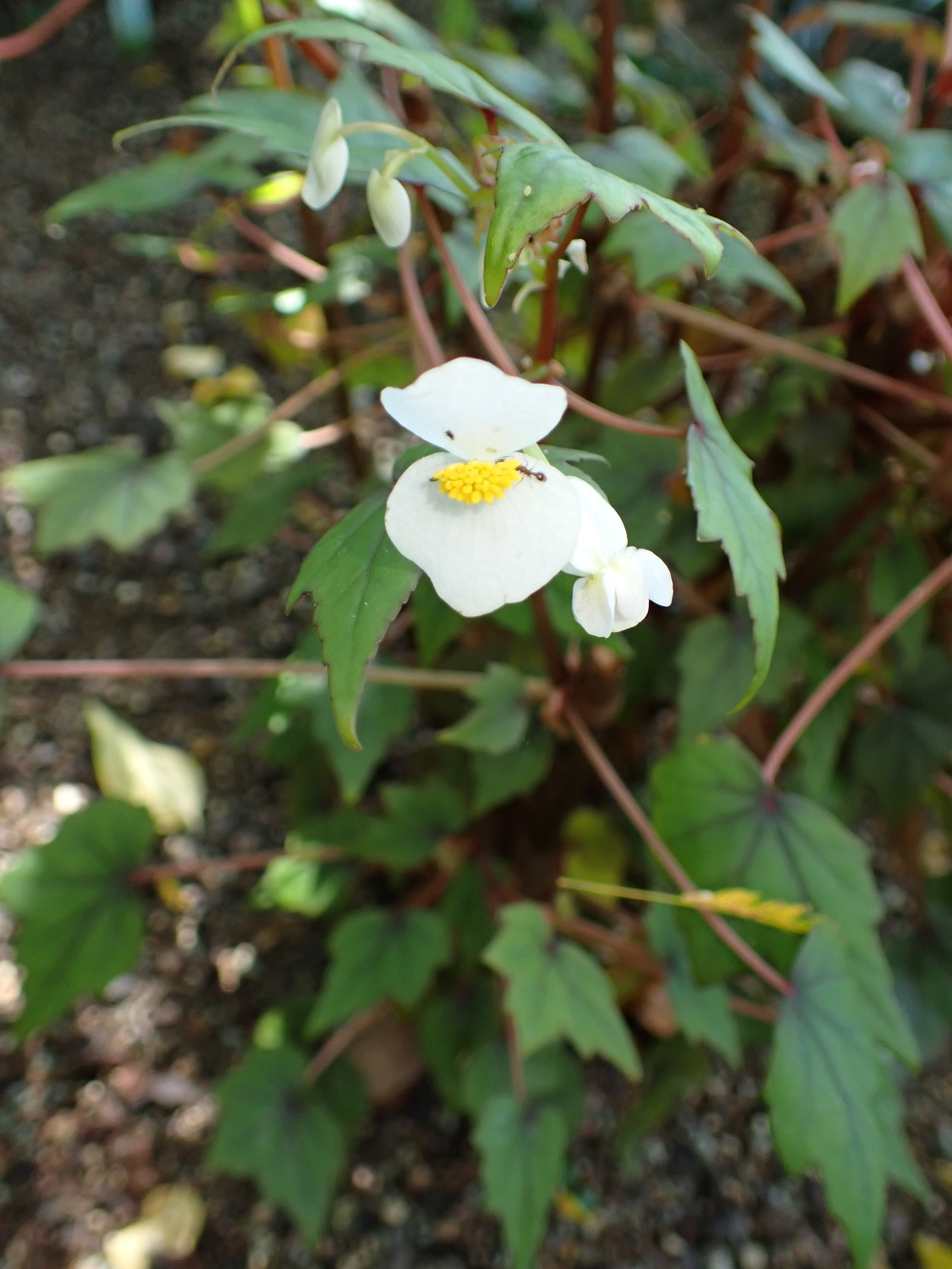

Scientific classification
- Kingdom: Plantae
- Clade: Tracheophytes
- Clade: Angiosperms
- Clade: Eudicots
- Clade: Rosids
- Order: Cucurbitales
- Family: Begoniaceae
- Genus: Begonia
- Species: B. homonyma

Binomial name
- Begonia homonyma Steud.

Synonyms
- List: Begonia sinuata E.Mey. ex Otto & A.Dietr.; Augustia afra (Meisn.) Klotzsch; Begonia afra Meisn.; Begonia afra var. favargeri (Rech. ex Zahlbr.) Irmsch.; Begonia dregei var. afra (Meisn.) A.DC.; Begonia dregei var. sinuata A.DC.; Begonia favargeri Rech. ex Zahlbr.; Begonia rudatisii Irmsch.; Begonia uncinata Klotzsch

= Begonia homonyma =

Species of flowering plant

Begonia homonyma, also known as the large-leaved wild begonia(EN), wildebegonia(Afr.), and idlula(Zul.) is a species of flowering plant in the family Begoniaceae, endemic to the Cape Provinces and KwaZulu-Natal. It is a tuberous geophyte.

B. homonyma is one of five indigenous Begonia species native to South Africa, the others being Begonia dregei, Begonia geranioides, Begonia sonderiana, and Begonia sutherlandii. Much like Begonia dregei, B. homonyma has a swollen caudex, which can grow up to 8 cm (3.1 in) in diameter, and the plant itself can get up to a meter tall. The species is so similar to B. dregei that they have sometimes been considered variations of the same plant, but B. homonyma can be distinguished by its leaves, which are larger, minimally lobed, and have raised veins.

B. homonyma is used traditionally by the Zulu people to treat chest ailments.
