= Cucumis ficifolius =

Scientific classification
- Kingdom: Plantae
- Clade: Tracheophytes
- Clade: Angiosperms
- Clade: Eudicots
- Clade: Rosids
- Order: Cucurbitales
- Family: Cucurbitaceae
- Genus: Cucumis
- Species: C. ficifolius

Binomial name
- Cucumis ficifolius A.Rich. (1851)

Synonyms
- Bryonia obtusa A.Rich.; Cucumis abyssinicus A.Rich.; Cucumis figarei Del.; Cucumis figarei Delile ex Naudin; Cucumis trilobatus Forssk.; Cucumis figarei var. cyrtopodus Naudin; Cucumis figarei var. microphyllus Naudin

Species of plant

Cucumis ficifolius is a dioecious flowering vine in the family Cucurbitaceae. The specific epithet (ficifolius) is derived from the Latin words ficus meaning "fig tree" and folium meaning "leaf".

== Distribution ==
Cucumis ficifolius is native to Africa and is found from Mauritania south to Ghana and Ivory Coast and east to the Horn of Africa and Tanzania and southwest to South Africa, as well as the Sinai Peninsula.

== Description ==
It is normally a prostrate plant with coarse, hairy stems and leaves. The leaf shape is ovate in outline and weakly cordate or subtruncate at the base and has 3–5 rounded lobes. The flowers occur solitarily and in males have yellow petals that measure 4–7 millimeters long each and in females measure 5–9 millimeters long each. The fruit is ovate and measures 23–50 millimeters (0.91–1.97 inches) in length and is green-yellow in color and is covered in small pustules that may look similar to spikes. The entire plant (stems, leaves, fruits, roots) is poisonous upon ingestion.

== See also ==
- List of Cucurbitales of South Africa
