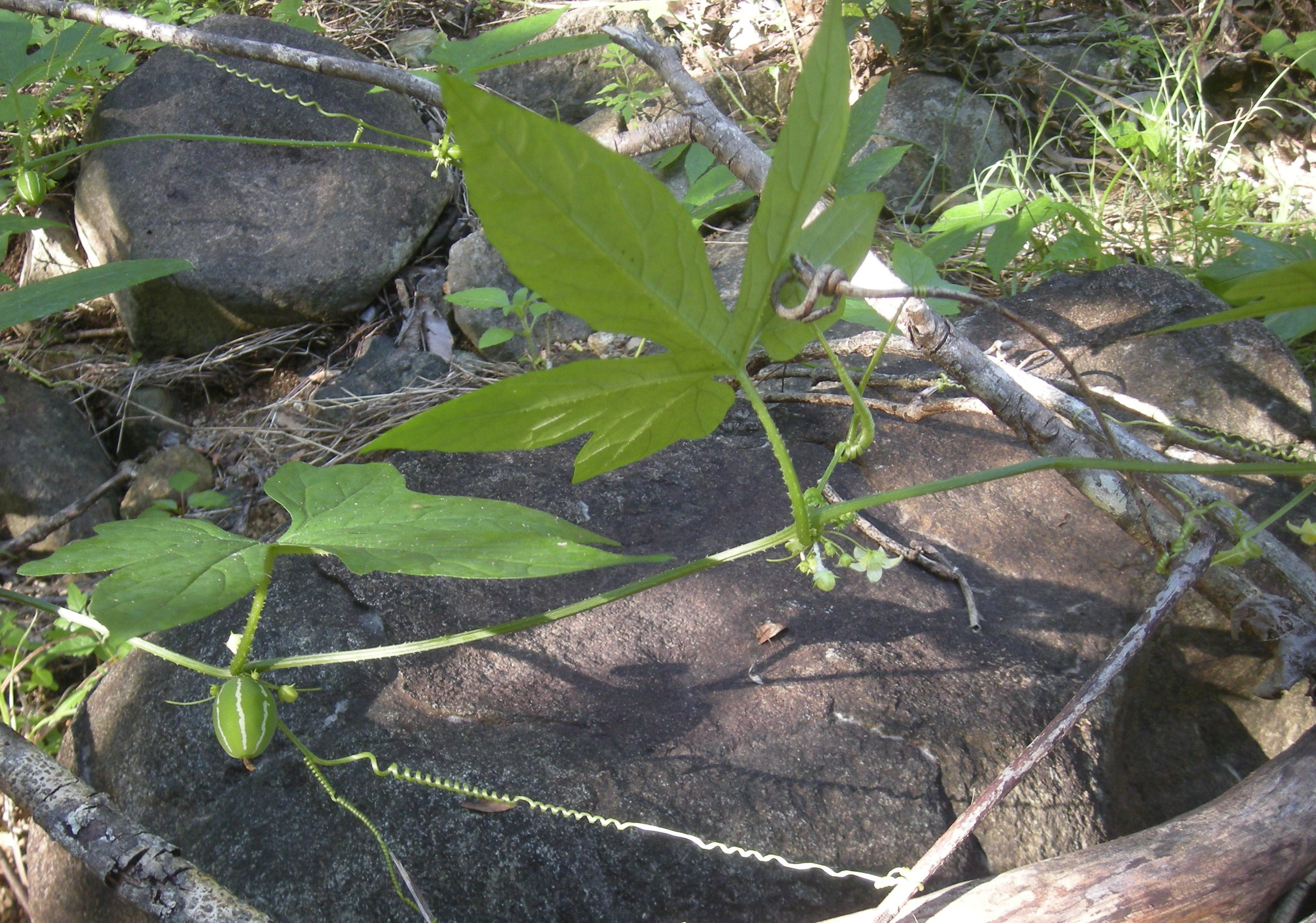
- Diplocyclos palmatus
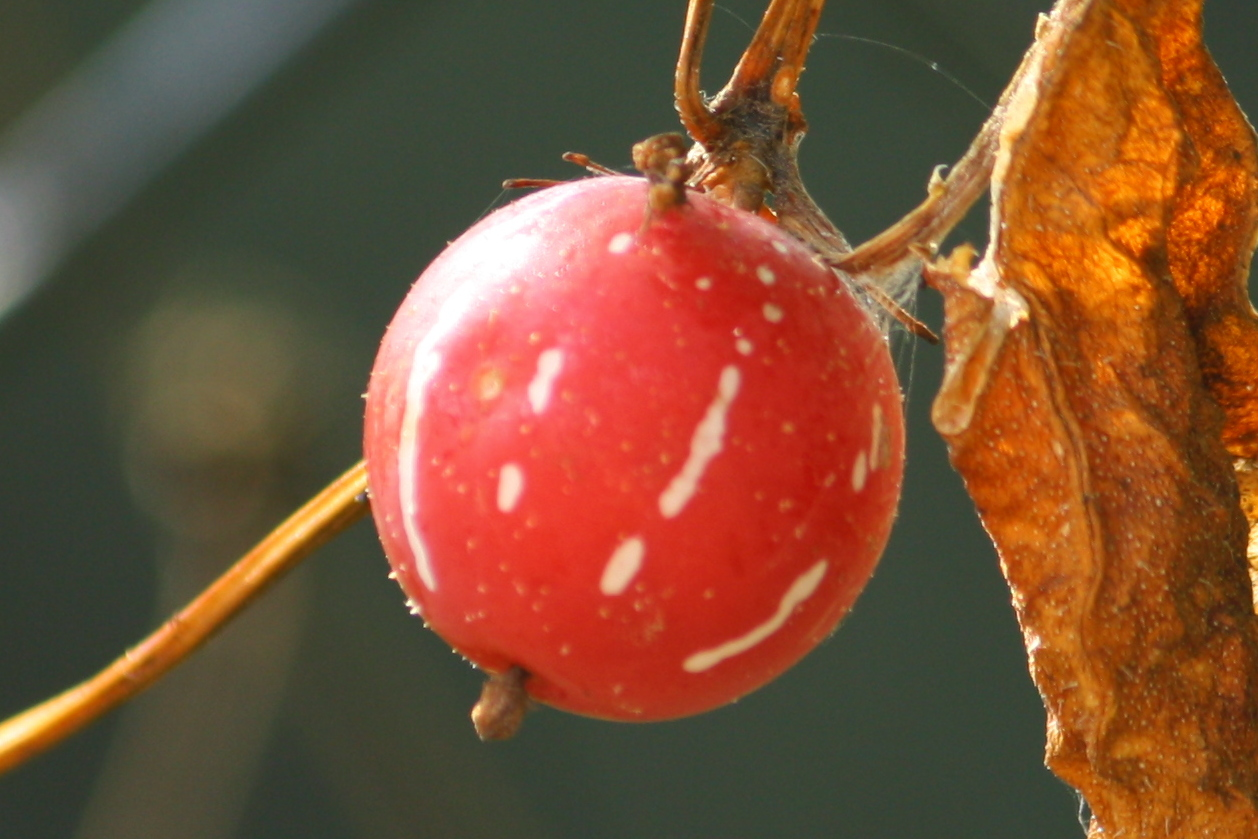
- Ripe fruit of Diplocyclos palmatus

Scientific classification
- Kingdom: Plantae
- Clade: Tracheophytes
- Clade: Angiosperms
- Clade: Eudicots
- Clade: Rosids
- Order: Cucurbitales
- Family: Cucurbitaceae
- Genus: Diplocyclos
- Species: D. palmatus

Binomial name
- Diplocyclos palmatus (L.) C.Jeffrey

= Diplocyclos palmatus =

Species of vine

Diplocyclos palmatus is a vine in the family Cucurbitaceae. It is commonly known as native bryony or striped cucumber. In Marathi, it is called shivlingi due to its seed which resembles a lingam.

== Distribution ==
The plant is distributed in rainforests and dry rainforests (Tropical and subtropical dry broadleaf forests) habitats. The vine grows in thickets, monsoon forests, lowland and upland disturbed areas, and mountain rain forests.
