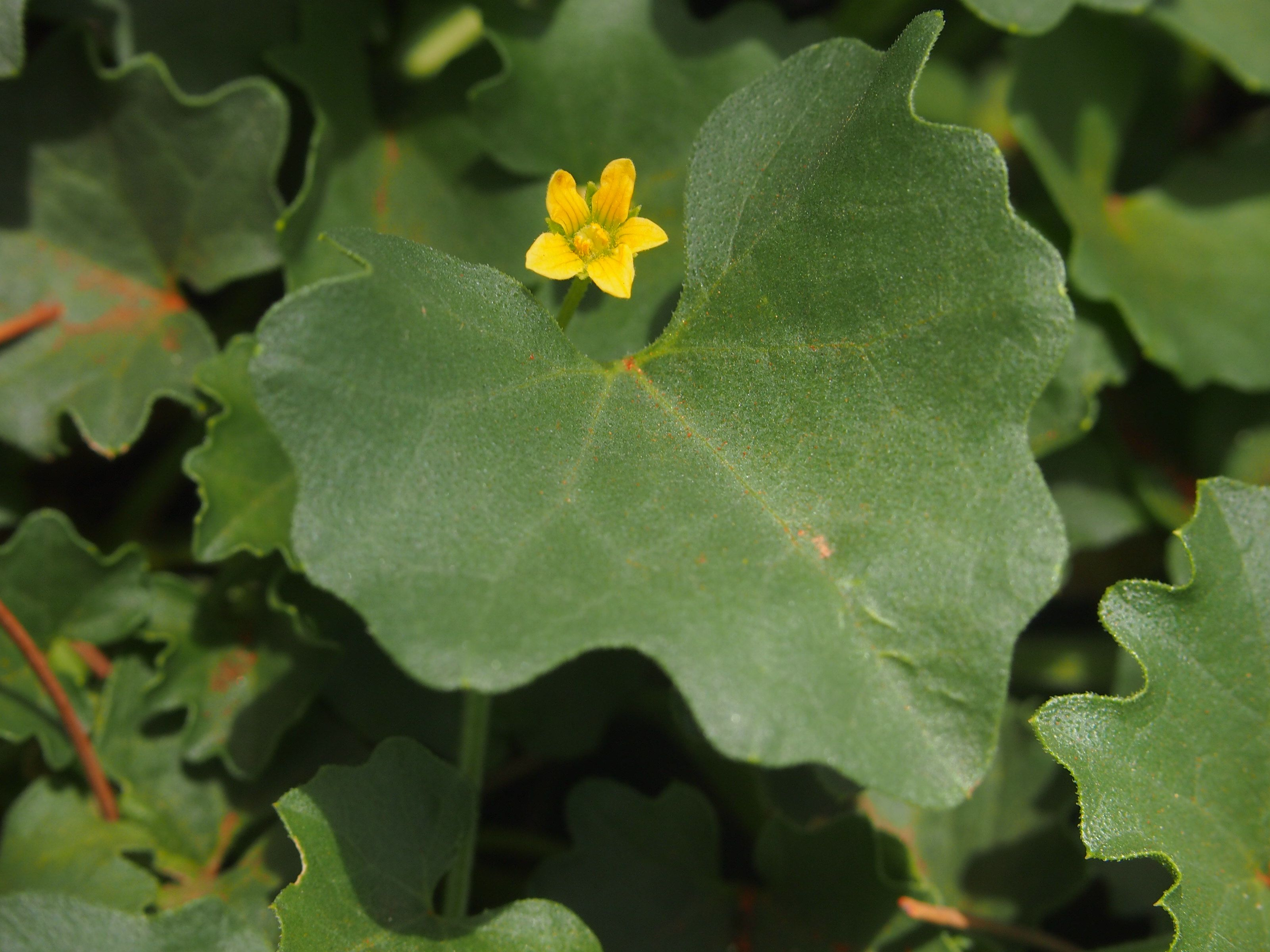

Scientific classification
- Kingdom: Plantae
- Clade: Tracheophytes
- Clade: Angiosperms
- Clade: Eudicots
- Clade: Rosids
- Order: Cucurbitales
- Family: Cucurbitaceae
- Genus: Cucumis
- Species: C. maderaspatanus

Binomial name
- Cucumis maderaspatanus L.

Synonyms
- Bryonia cordifolia L.; Bryonia gracilis Wall.; Bryonia hispida Salisb.; Bryonia maderaspatana (L.) Lam.; Bryonia micropoda E.Mey.; Bryonia obtusa A.Rich.; Bryonia rottleri Spreng.; Bryonia scabra Rottler ex Wight & Arn., nom. illeg.; Bryonia scabrella L.f.; Coccinia cordifolia (L.) Cogn.; Melothria celebica Cogn.; Melothria maderaspatana (L.) Cogn.; Mukia celebica (Cogn.) F.M.Bailey; Mukia maderaspatana (L.) M.Roem.; Mukia rottleri M.Roem.; Mukia scabrella (L.f.) Arn.

= Cucumis maderaspatanus =

Species of plant

Cucumis maderaspatanus is a species of plant in the family Cucurbitaceae. The species is found throughout the tropics and subtropics, from west Africa to Australia. One of its many synonyms is Mukia maderaspatana.

== Image Gallery ==
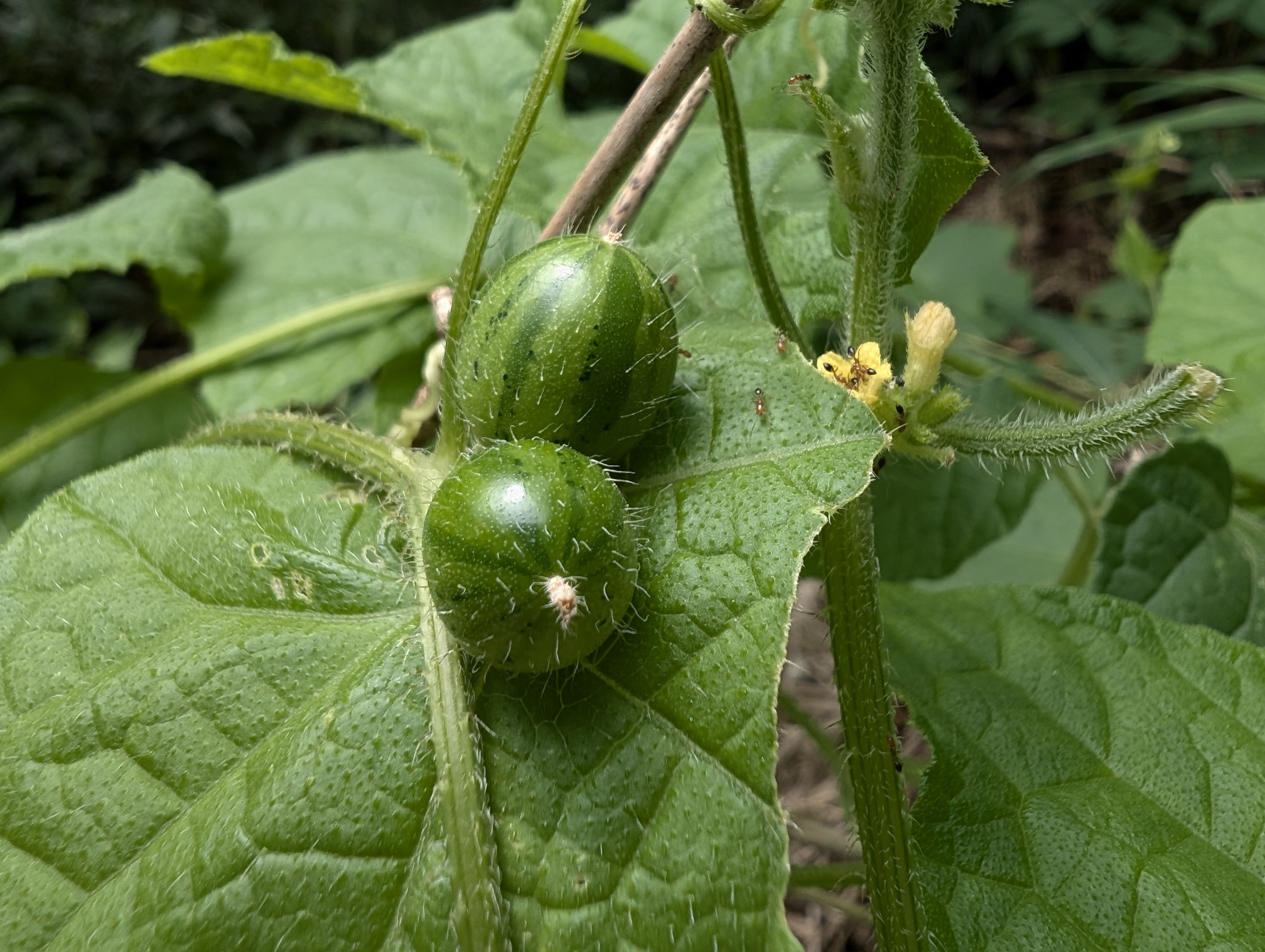

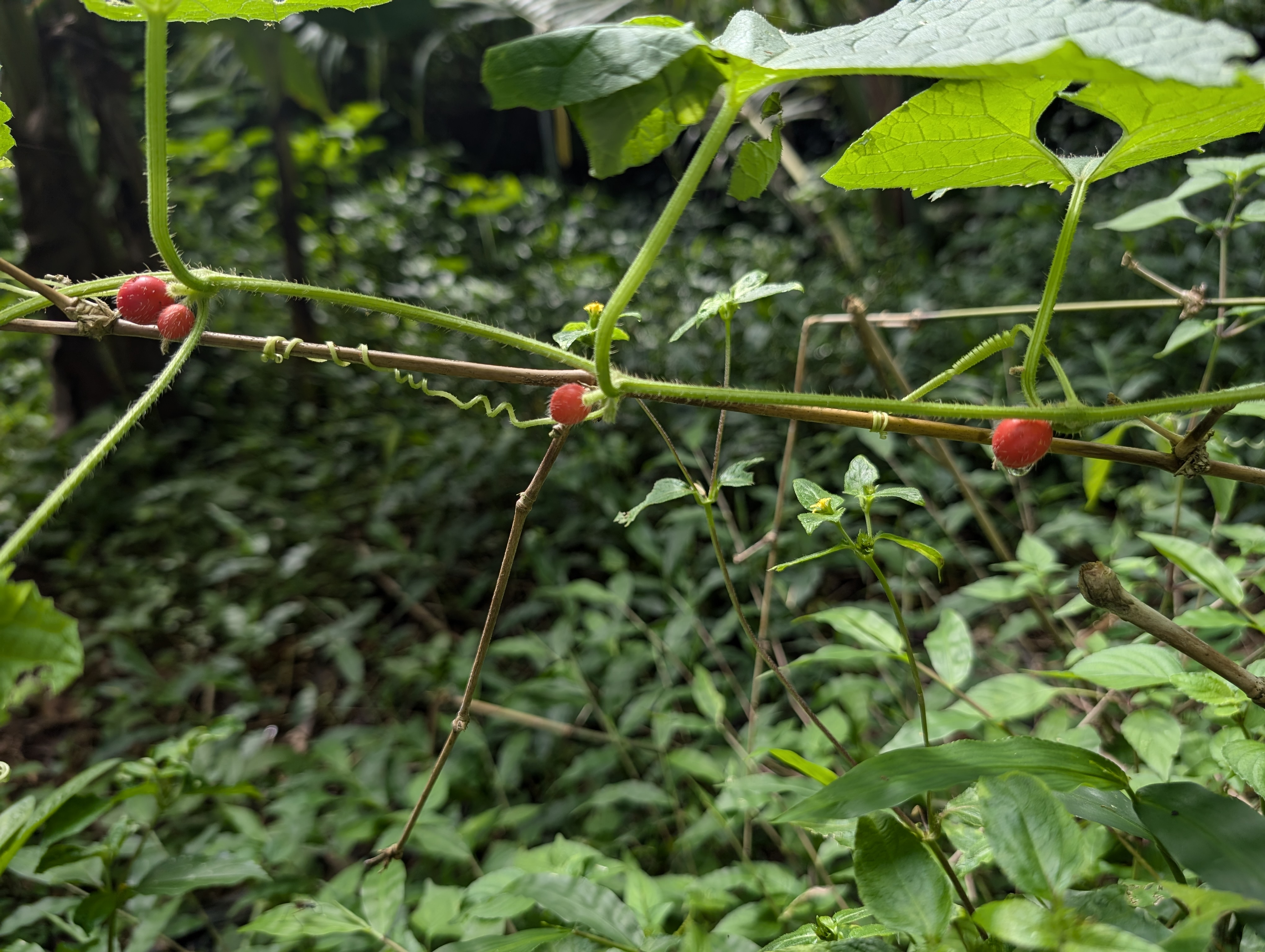

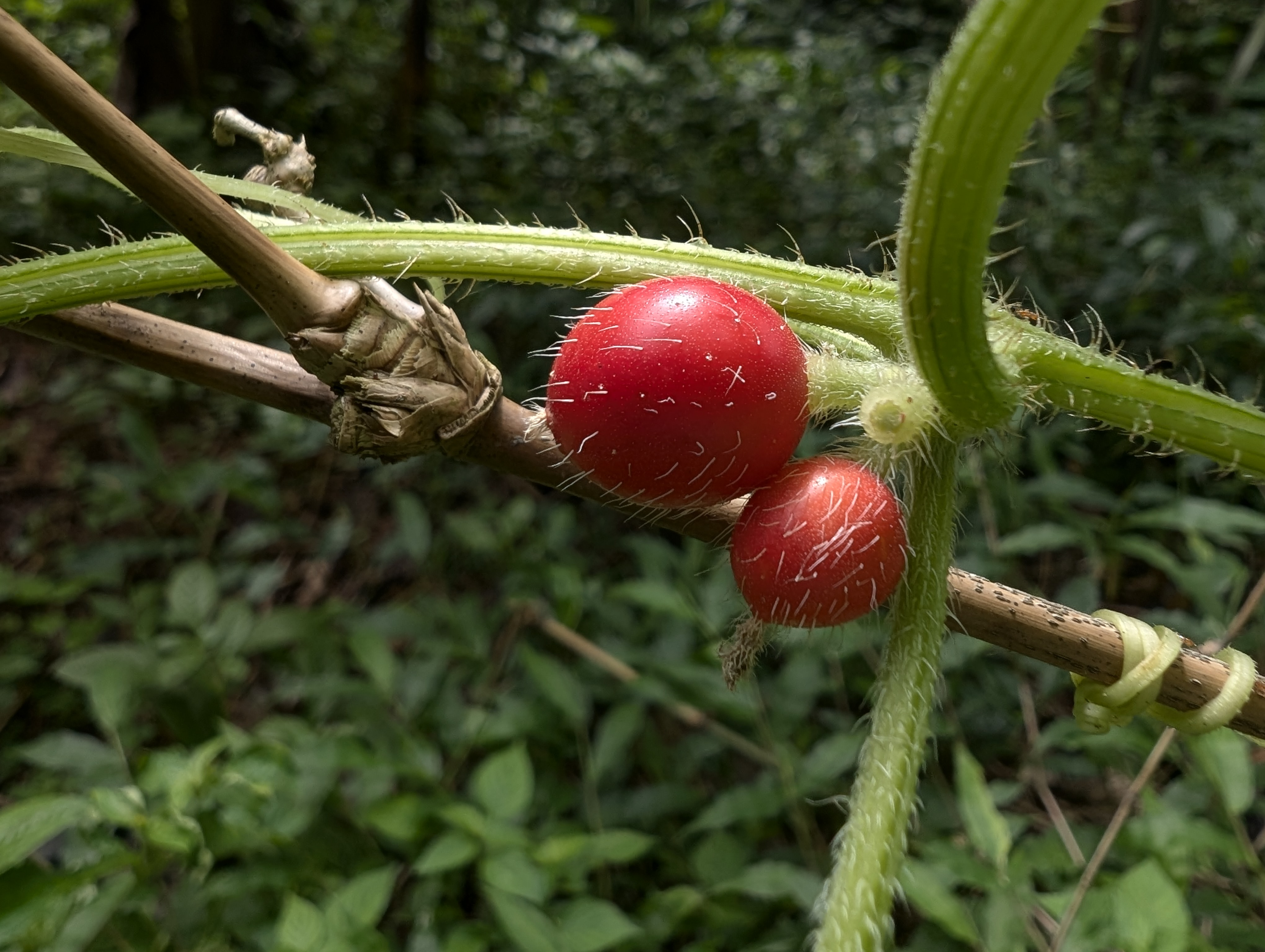
