= Khmeriosicyos =

Scientific classification
- Kingdom: Plantae
- Clade: Embryophytes
- Clade: Tracheophytes
- Clade: Angiosperms
- Clade: Eudicots
- Clade: Rosids
- Order: Cucurbitales
- Family: Cucurbitaceae
- Genus: Khmeriosicyos; W.J.de Wilde & Duyfjes

Genus of plants

Khmeriosicyos is a genus of flowering plants belonging to the family Cucurbitaceae. Its native range is Southern Indo-China.

== Species ==
- Khmeriosicyos harmandii W.J.de Wilde & Duyfjes
