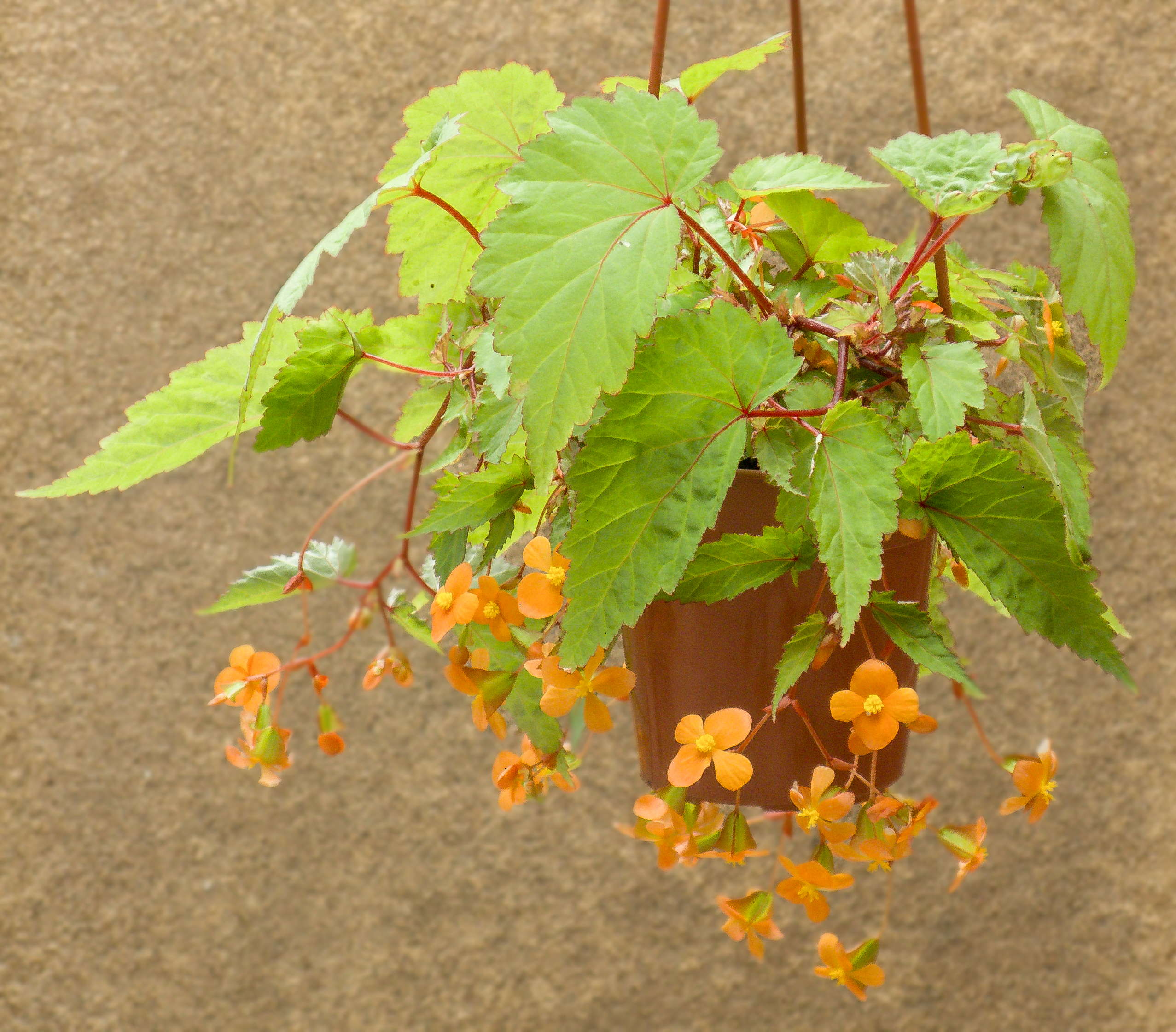
- In cultivation

Scientific classification
- Kingdom: Plantae
- Clade: Tracheophytes
- Clade: Angiosperms
- Clade: Eudicots
- Clade: Rosids
- Order: Cucurbitales
- Family: Begoniaceae
- Genus: Begonia
- Species: B. sutherlandii

Binomial name
- Begonia sutherlandii Hook.f.

= Begonia sutherlandii =

Species of flowering plant

Begonia sutherlandii, known as the Sutherland begonia and as iwozya in Kimalila, Tanzania, is a tuberous flowering perennial plant in the family Begoniaceae, growing to 0.5 metres (20 in) with fleshy pink stems from 10 to 80 centimetres (4 to 31 in) long. Leaves are commonly dark green and veined with red and covered with short hairs on the underside. They are asymmetrical in shape and the margin is toothed. Flowers, produced in pendent panicles throughout summer, are 20–26 millimetres (0.8–1.0 in) in diameter, and are usually orange or orange–red with yellow anthers.

The plant is native to the southern highlands of Tanzania and is often found hanging over rocks in damp shady situations or on trees. It is also present in the Democratic Republic of the Congo and in South Africa.

Begonia sutherlandii can be cultivated outdoors in frost-free areas. It has gained the Royal Horticultural Society's Award of Garden Merit.

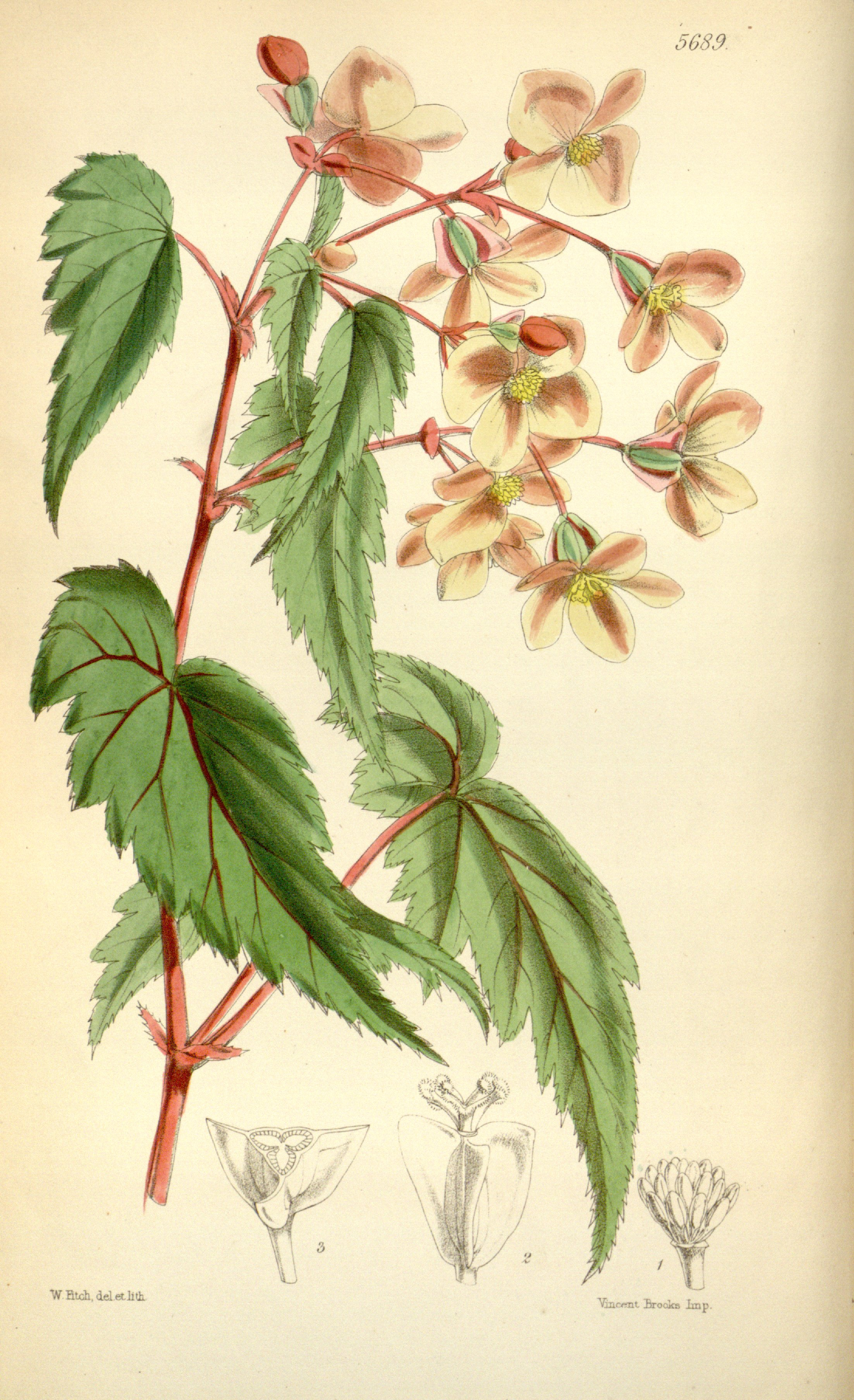
Illustration from Curtis's Botanical Magazine (1868)

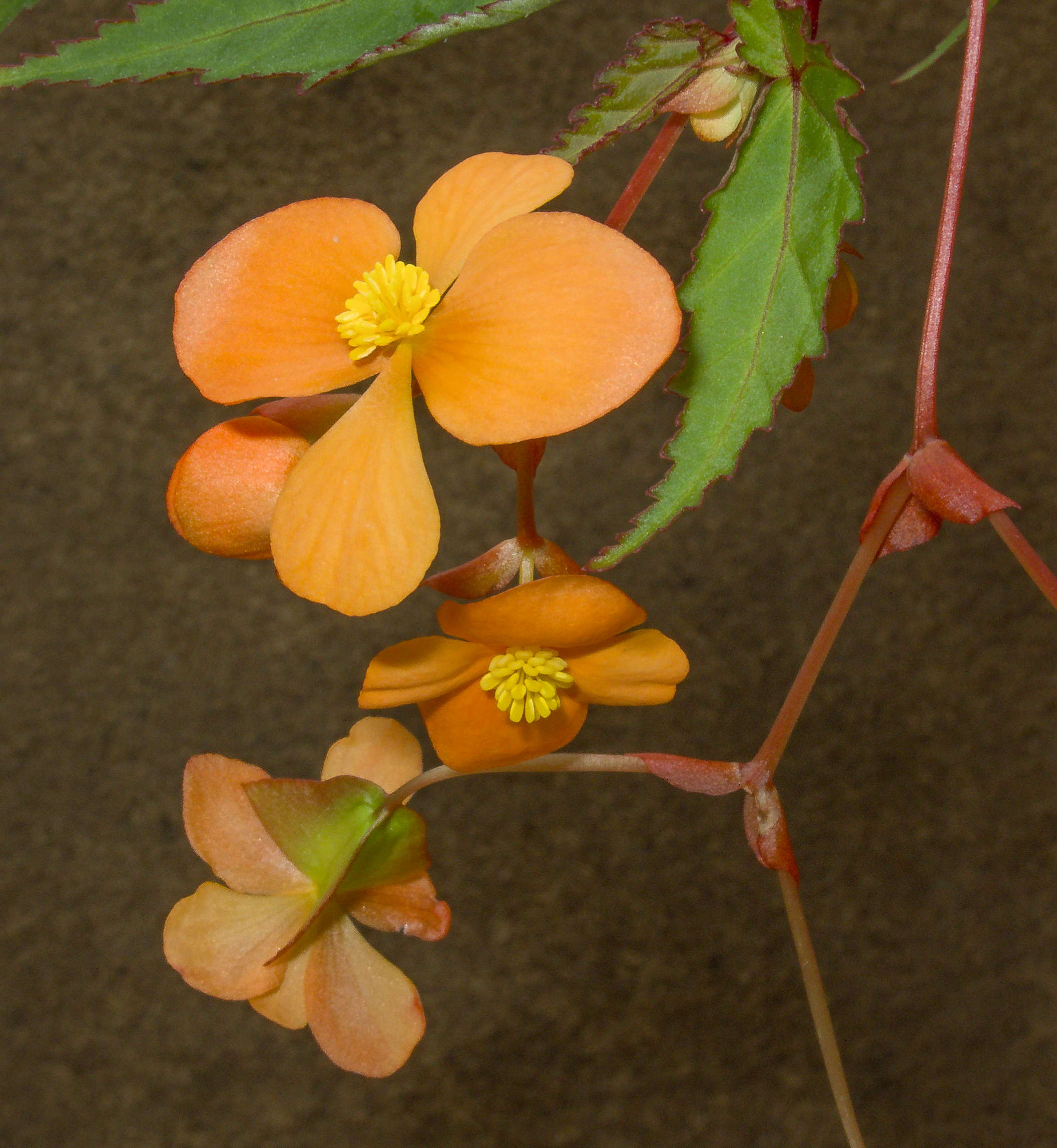
Flowers
