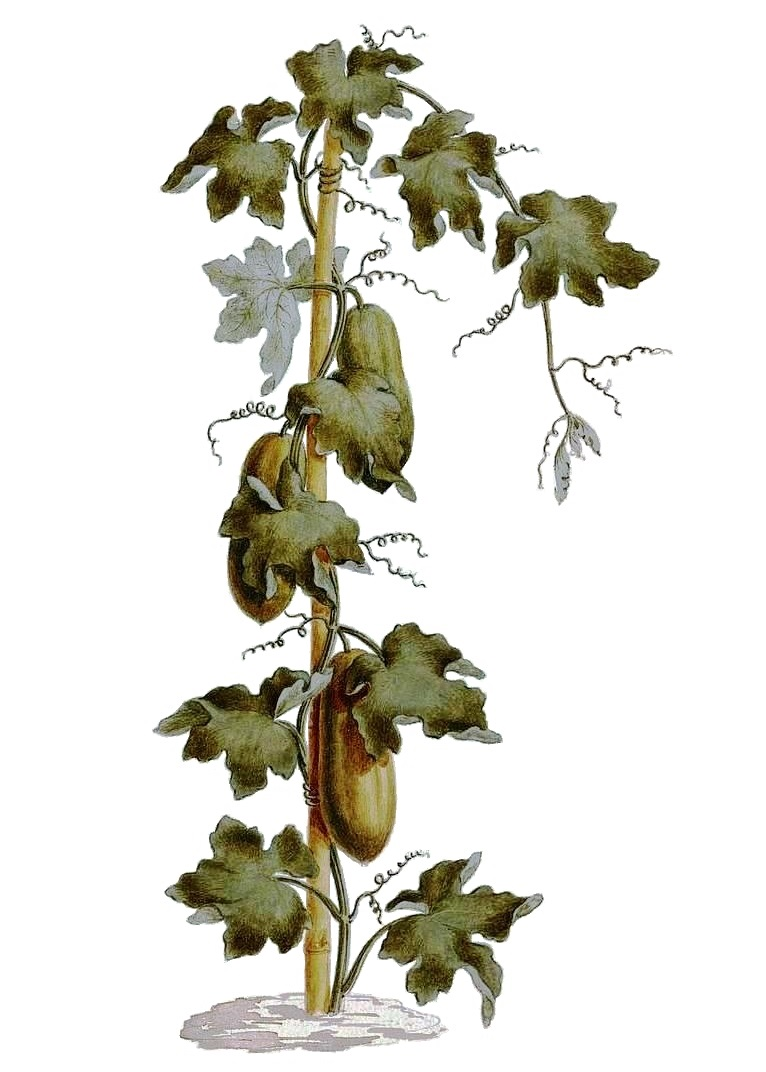
- P. vogelii, illustrated by L. Balugani

Scientific classification
- Kingdom: Plantae
- Clade: Embryophytes
- Clade: Tracheophytes
- Clade: Angiosperms
- Clade: Eudicots
- Clade: Rosids
- Order: Cucurbitales
- Family: Cucurbitaceae
- Genus: Peponium; Engl.

= Peponium =

Genus of plants

Peponium is a genus of flowering plants belonging to the family Cucurbitaceae.

Its native range is Tropical and Southern Africa, and Western Indian Ocean.

== Species ==
Species:

- Peponium betsiliense Keraudren
- Peponium boivinii (Cogn.) Engl.
- Peponium caledonicum (Sond.) Engl.
- Peponium chirindense (Baker f.) Cogn.
- Peponium cienkowskii (Schweinf.) Engl.
- Peponium grandidieri Keraudren
- Peponium hirtellum Keraudren
- Peponium humbertii Keraudren
- Peponium laceratum Keraudren
- Peponium lagenarioides (Hook.f.) Cogn.
- Peponium leucanthum (Gilg) Cogn.
- Peponium mackenii (Naudin) Engl.
- Peponium pageanum C.Jeffrey
- Peponium perrieri Keraudren
- Peponium poissonii Keraudren
- Peponium racemosum Keraudren
- Peponium seyrigii Keraudren
- Peponium sublitorale C.Jeffrey & J.S.Page
- Peponium vogelii (Hook.f.) Engl.
