= Blastania =

Scientific classification
- Kingdom: Plantae
- Clade: Embryophytes
- Clade: Tracheophytes
- Clade: Angiosperms
- Clade: Eudicots
- Clade: Rosids
- Order: Cucurbitales
- Family: Cucurbitaceae
- Genus: Blastania; Kotschy & Peyr.

Genus of flowering plants

Blastania is a genus of flowering plants belonging to the family Cucurbitaceae.

Its native range is Tropical and Southern Africa, Madagascar, Arabian Peninsula, Indian subcontinent.

Its species are:

- Blastania cerasiformis (Stocks) A.Meeuse
- Blastania garcinii (Burm.f.) Cogn.
- Blastania lucorum (Keraudren) H.Schaef.
