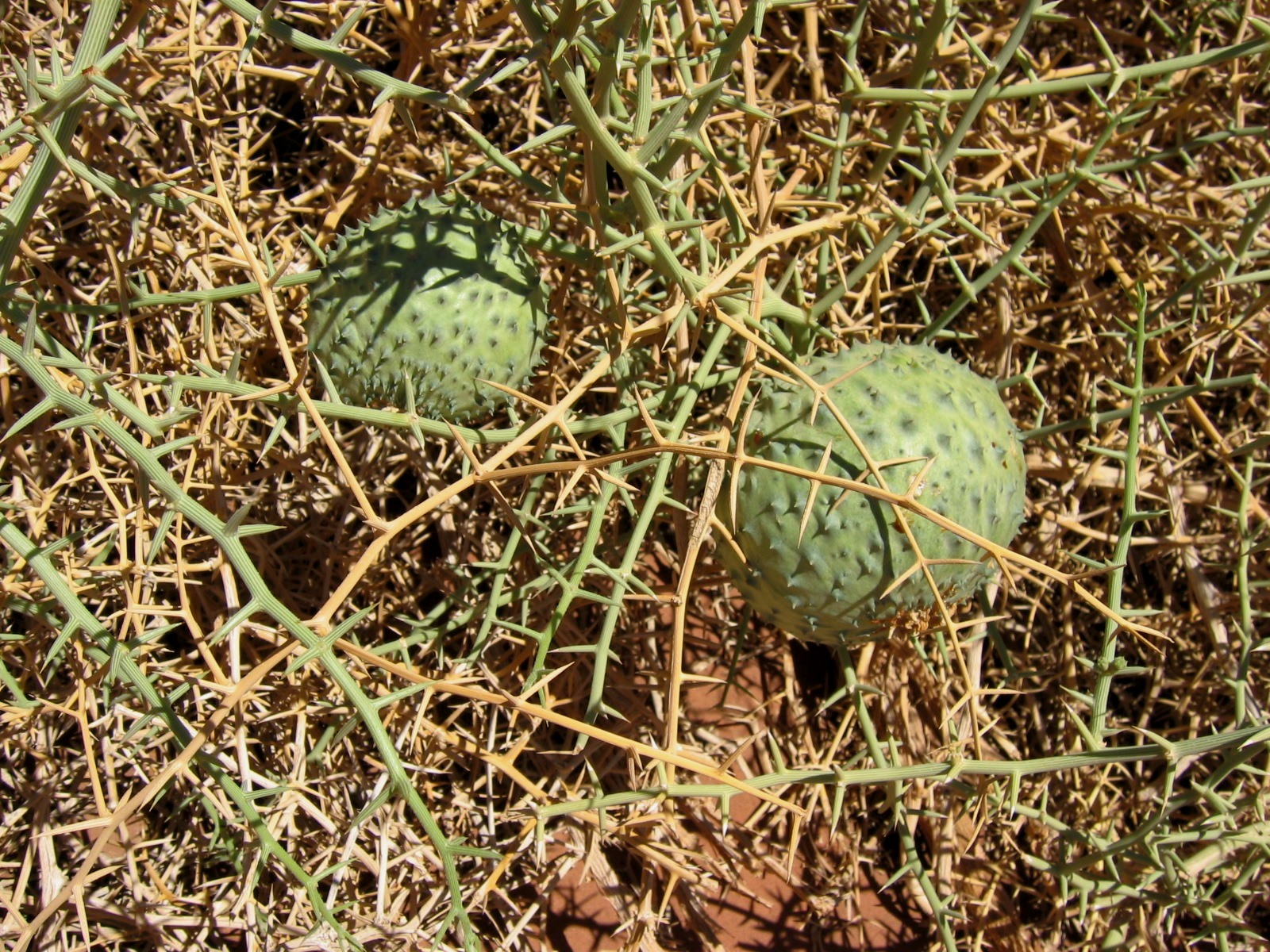
- Acanthosicyos horridus, a member of the Cucurbitoideae native to Namibia

Scientific classification
- Kingdom: Plantae
- Clade: Tracheophytes
- Clade: Angiosperms
- Clade: Eudicots
- Clade: Rosids
- Order: Cucurbitales
- Family: Cucurbitaceae
- Subfamily: Cucurbitoideae; Eaton

Tribes
- Benincaseae; Bryonieae; Coniandreae; Cucurbiteae; Indofevilleeae; Joliffieae; Momordiceae; Schizopeponeae; Sicyoeae; Siraitieae; Thladiantheae

= Cucurbitoideae =

Subfamily of flowering plants

The Cucurbitoideae are a subfamily of the flowering plant family Cucurbitaceae (gourds). The Cucurbitaceae are divided into two subfamilies, the Zanonioideae, probably a paraphyletic group of remainders, and the well-supported monophyletic Cucurbitoideae.

The subfamily Cucurbitoideae consists of eight tribes. Members of the tribe Cucurbiteae produce economically valuable fruits, called gourds, which include crops like squashes (including pumpkins), luffas, and melons (including watermelons). The tribe Benincaseae contains a genus called Lagenaria whose members produce gourds that can be eaten when young or whose ripe shells can be dried and used as containers.
