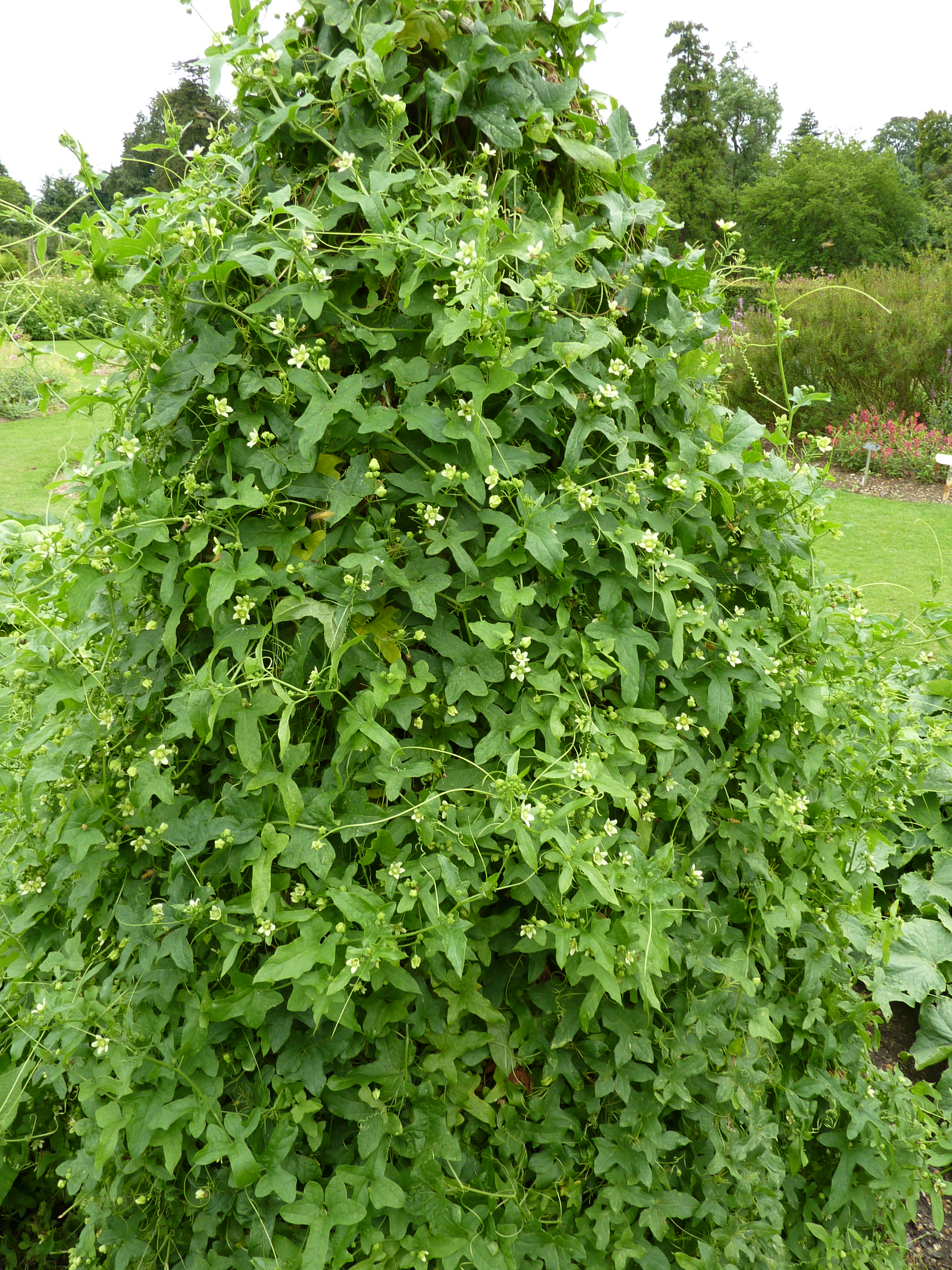
- Red bryony (B. dioica)

Scientific classification
- Kingdom: Plantae
- Clade: Embryophytes
- Clade: Tracheophytes
- Clade: Spermatophytes
- Clade: Angiosperms
- Clade: Eudicots
- Clade: Rosids
- Order: Cucurbitales
- Family: Cucurbitaceae
- Subfamily: Cucurbitoideae
- Tribe: Bryonieae
- Genus: Bryonia; L.

Diversity
- 12 species

= Bryonia =

Genus of plants

Bryonia is a genus of flowering plants in the gourd family. Bryony /ˈbraɪ.əni/ is its best-known common name. They are native to western Eurasia and adjacent regions, such as North Africa, the Canary Islands and South Asia.

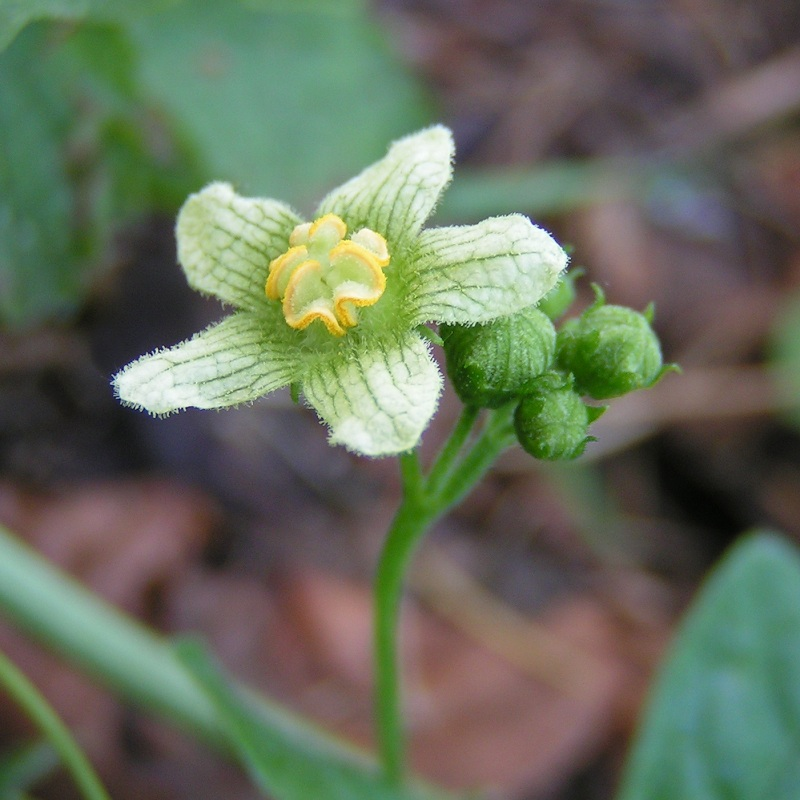
Male flower of white bryony (B. alba)

== Description and ecology ==
Bryonies are perennial, tendril-climbing herbs with palmately lobed leaves, flowers in axillary clusters, and the fruit is a smooth globular berry.

Bryonia is used as a food plant by the larvae of some Lepidoptera (butterflies and moths), including the tortrix moth Phtheochroa rugosana (recorded on red bryony, B. dioica) and the cabbage moth (Mamestra brassicae). The horticultural value contributes to formation of pest and crop damage by the food plant consumption.

== Use by humans ==
Bryonies are occasionally grown in gardens, sometimes accidentally, sometimes deliberately so. Some species find use in herbal medicine. Generally however, these plants are poisonous, some highly so, and may be fatal if ingested. Cucurbitacin glycosides are primarily responsible for the plants' bitterness and emetic effects.

Variants of the plants' name, such as Bryony, are used in some cultures as female given names. They were quite popular in the 18th century.

The Royal Navy of the United Kingdom named two ships HMS Bryony after the plant.

== Species ==
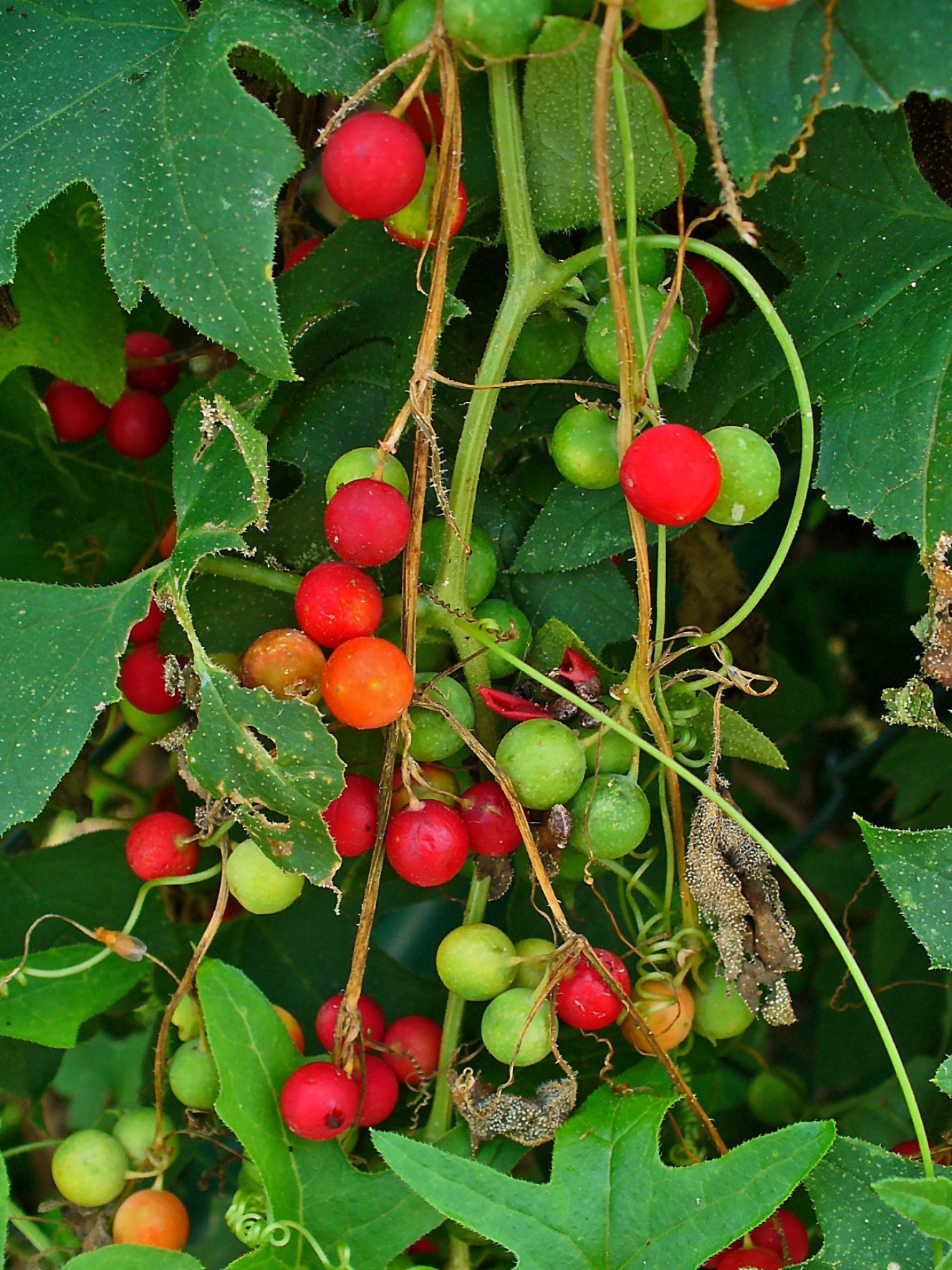
The toxic berries of red bryony (B. dioica)

Twelve species are currently accepted by the USDA: Ten of these are supported in a molecular-phylogenetic analysis: The only English species, B. dioica (red bryony), grows in hedgerows as far north as Yorkshire.

- Bryonia acuta Desf. (formerly sometimes included in B. cretica)
- Bryonia alba L. – white bryony
- Bryonia aspera Steven ex Ledeb.
- Bryonia cretica L. – Cretan bryony
- Bryonia dioica Jacq. – white or red bryony (formerly sometimes included in B. cretica)
- Bryonia lappifolia Vassilcz.
- Bryonia marmorata E.M.A.Petit
- Bryonia melanocarpa Nabiev
- Bryonia monoica Aitch. & Hemsl.
- Bryonia multiflora Boiss. & Heldr.
- Bryonia syriaca Boiss.
- Bryonia verrucosa Aiton

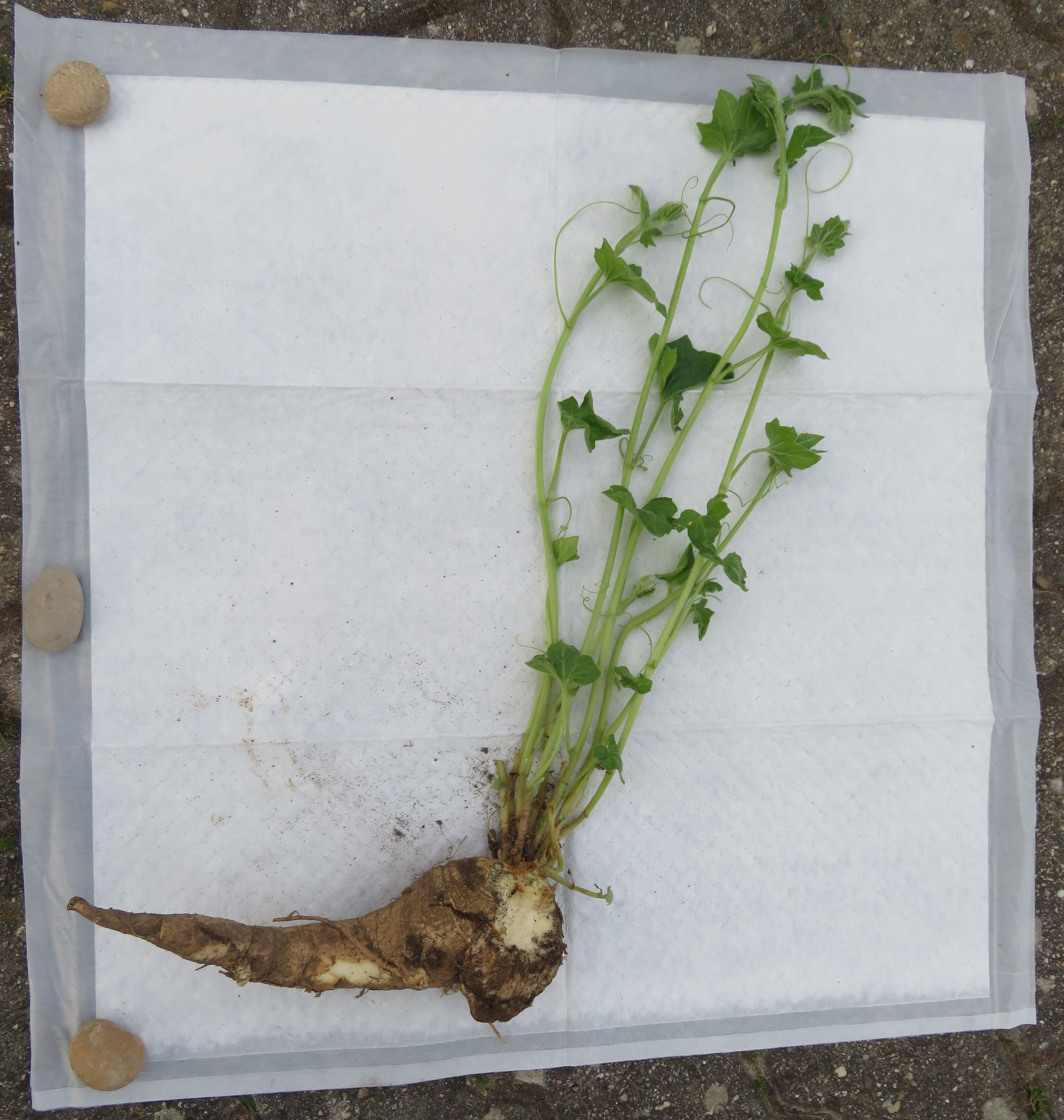
A bryony with its dup-up root.

=== Formerly placed here ===
- Many species of Cayaponia ("American bryonies")
- Several species of Cucumis, Solena and Zehneria
- Coccinia abyssinica
- Corallocarpus epigaeus
- Diplocyclos palmatus
- Kedrostis africana
- Melothria pendula (as B. guadalupensis)
- Trichosanthes ovigera (as B. cucumeroides)

== See also ==
- Bryonopsis (meaning "looks like bryony"), a now-invalid genus currently assigned to close (Diplocyclos) and somewhat more distant (Kedrostis) relatives of Bryonia
