= Ladies' seal =

Ladies' seal or lady's seal may refer to:

- Bryonia alba, native to Europe and northern Iran
- Bryonia dioica, native to central and southern Europe
- Dioscorea communis, native to Eurasia
