= B. alba =

B. alba may refer to:

- Baptisia alba, the white wild indigo or white false indigo, a herbaceous plant species native from central and eastern North America
- Basella alba, the Malabar spinach, a perennial vine species found in the tropics
- Bidens alba, an Asteraceae plant species.
- Bryonia alba, the white bryony, a vigorous Eurasian vine species introduced into Western North America

== See also ==
- Alba (disambiguation)
