= Cretan bryony =

Cretan bryony is a common name for several plants and may refer to:

- Bryonia cretica
- Bryonia dioica, native to central and southern Europe
