= Austrobryonia micrantha =

Scientific classification
- Kingdom: Plantae
- Clade: Tracheophytes
- Clade: Angiosperms
- Clade: Eudicots
- Clade: Rosids
- Order: Cucurbitales
- Family: Cucurbitaceae
- Genus: Austrobryonia
- Species: A. micrantha

Binomial name
- Austrobryonia micrantha (F.Muell.) I.Telford (2008)

Species of flowering plant

Austrobryonia micrantha, commonly known as desert cucumber or mallee cucumber, is a species of flowering plant belonging to the family Cucurbitaceae, native to inland Australia.

Austrobryonia micrantha is a perennial that grows back every year from its thick root, even after the stems wither. The plant typically grows as a dense mat with horizontally spreading stems that alternate, extending over several metres. When fruiting, it produces a heavy crop of fruit on stems that are thin and ribbed, with rough hairs. The plant produces simple tendrils that reach up to 40 mm in length.

The leaves are rough to the touch and have a wide, heart-shaped, or oval shape with the edges being toothed or slightly divided into 3-7 lobes. They measure 15–60 mm (0.59–2.36 in) long and 12–45 mm (0.47–1.77 in) wide.

During the dry season, the stems wither, and grow back when stimulated by heavy rains or flooding, usually from the wet season.

== Flowers and fruits ==
=== Flowering ===
Flowering and fruiting occur between the months of January and May.

Male flowers are arranged in groups of 1–3, with short stems of 3–5 mm (0.12–0.20 in). They have a wide and bell-shaped base, measuring 1–1.5 mm (0.039–0.059 in), and are covered in fine hairs on the outside. The narrow-triangular lobes of the calyx are 1–1.2 mm (0.039–0.047 in) long and have hairs on the underside. The petals of the petals are rounded and smooth on the top side, while the bottom side is covered in fine hairs and small glands. The colour of the male flowers is yellow-green.

The female flowers are grouped in clusters of 2–5, with slightly longer stems of 3–8 mm (0.12–0.31 in). The structure of the petals and sepals are similar to that of the male flowers. Both male and female flowers are often found together in small clusters. The flowers are small in size and are pale yellow or greenish-yellow in colour, with each flower having 5 petals. They are positioned at the bases of the leaves.

=== Fruits ===
A heavy crop of fruit is produced. Each fruit is round to elongated, measuring 10–14 mm (0.39–0.55 in) in length and 7–13 mm (0.28–0.51 in) in diameter. The stem holding the fruit can reach up to 18 mm (0.71 in) in length. The seeds are ovate-shaped, ranging from 4–6.5 mm (0.16–0.26 in) in length and 2.5–3.5 mm (0.098–0.138 in) in width. They are flat, smooth, and pale buff in colour.

When fully ripened, the fruit appears green or greenish-yellow in colour and falls off the stem. They have been described as being unpalatable and sour.

== Habitat ==
Austrobryonia micrantha is commonly observed in habitats where water accumulates, such as river flood plains, waterholes, dam margins, roadside canals, and swales in dunefields. The species is adaptable to a range of soil types, including sandy, loamy, and argillous (clay) soils. While it can live in both arid and humid conditions, it generally lives best in areas with well-drained soils.

== Distribution ==
Austrobryonia micrantha is distributed across various regions of Australia, but it is primarily found extending from inland areas ranging from Lake Eyre to the Murray Darling region, stretching from the Finke River to Boulia in the north. It can also be found around Louth in Queensland and Western New South Wales, all the way through to the Wimmera region of Victoria. The species is known in a variety of habitats where it is likely dispersed by large terrestrial birds, such as emus and Australian bustards, which have the ability to consume the fruit whole. Livestock have been observed to actively avoid consuming the unappetizing fruit, while large birds and waterbirds are known to include it in their diet.

== Conservation status ==
Austrobryonia micrantha is endangered only in Victoria.

== Evolutionary relationships ==
A 2008 study reclassified Mukia micrantha into a newly identified genus called Austrobryonia. Molecular clock analysis of Austrobryonia indicated that the genus was approximately 8 million years old and represented a sister clade to the older genera Bryonia and Ecballium, found in Eurasia and the Mediterranean regions, both estimated to be around 42 million years old. These sister clades shared similar habitat preferences, and shared no physical characteristics.

== Taxonomic key ==
The female flowers of Austrobryonia micrantha are typically found in groups of 2–5, mostly located at the same position as the leaves, and accompanied by 1-3 male flowers, whereas other species of Austrobryonia are differentiated by their larger fruit and singular flowers.

The key morphological characteristics of Austrobryonia micrantha are:

- Fruit is ellipsoidal in shape and measures approximately 10–14 mm (0.39–0.55 in) in length.
- Female flower in fascicles of 2–5 with 1-3 coaxillary male flowers.
