= Zehneria tridactyla =

Scientific classification
- Kingdom: Plantae
- Clade: Tracheophytes
- Clade: Angiosperms
- Clade: Eudicots
- Clade: Rosids
- Order: Cucurbitales
- Family: Cucurbitaceae
- Genus: Zehneria
- Species: Z. tridactyla

Binomial name
- Zehneria tridactyla (Hook.f.)

Species of plant

Zehneria tridactyla is an annual climbing herb currently accepted has part of the Cucurbitaceae family.

== Taxonomy ==
Melothria tridactyla found in the various East and Central African countries was differentiated from the similar Zehneri thwaitesii found in Ceylon by Hooker in Flora of Tropical Africa in 1871. But it was later delimited to Z. thwaitesii, lately studies have shown a different taxa evolutionary lineage between the Asian Zehneria and its African counterpart.

== Morphology ==
Smooth or scabrid stems and branches. Leaves are triangular in shape, 3.5 × 10 cm long; 3 lobed with lateral lobe placed at right angles with the middle lobe which is the longest. Petioles are long or short.

== Distribution ==
Plant is native to Tropical Africa including the island of Madagascar.
