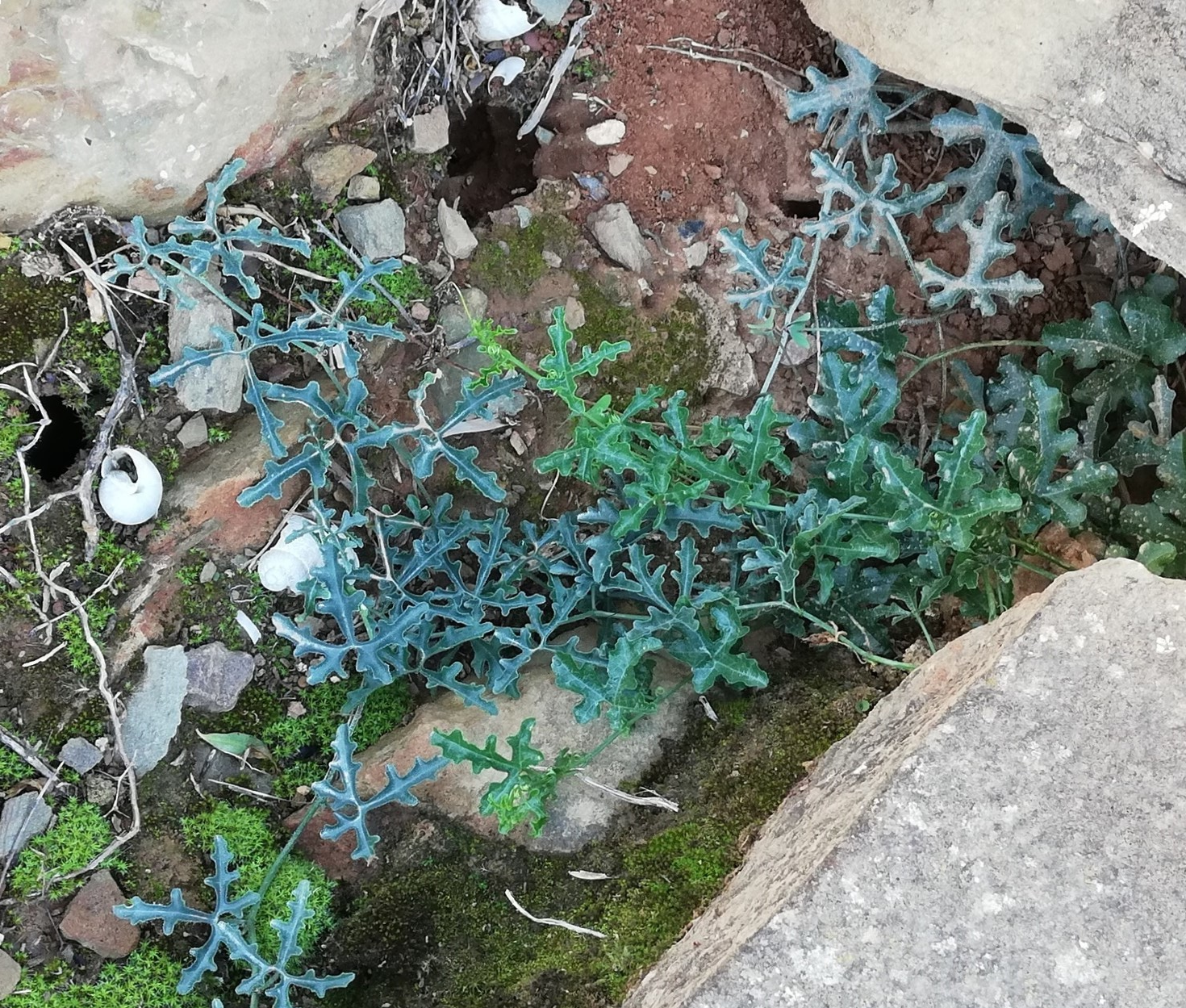

Scientific classification
- Kingdom: Plantae
- Clade: Tracheophytes
- Clade: Angiosperms
- Clade: Eudicots
- Clade: Rosids
- Order: Cucurbitales
- Family: Cucurbitaceae
- Genus: Kedrostis
- Species: K. capensis

Binomial name
- Kedrostis capensis (Sond.) A.Meeuse

= Kedrostis capensis =

Species of plant

Kedrostis capensis is a species of flowering plant in the family Cucurbitaceae, indigenous to rocky, karoo slopes in South Africa and Namibia.

Its distribution is across the Karoo region and Swartberg mountains, as far west as Lambert's Bay, and as far north as southern Namibia.

== Description ==
It is a monoecious plant with leaves that are usually deeply lobed/palmatisect (like its close relative Kedrostis africana, but in contrast to Kedrostis nana). The leaves are usually grey-green in colour, and the upper leaves have slender (often linear) lobes, with thick rough margins. All parts of the plant are often covered in fine, short hairs.

In its natural habitat, its greenish flowers usually appear from October to April, often before the leaves appear. The flowers are produced in the leaf axils. The female flowers are solitary, while the male ones are in groups (fascicled).
