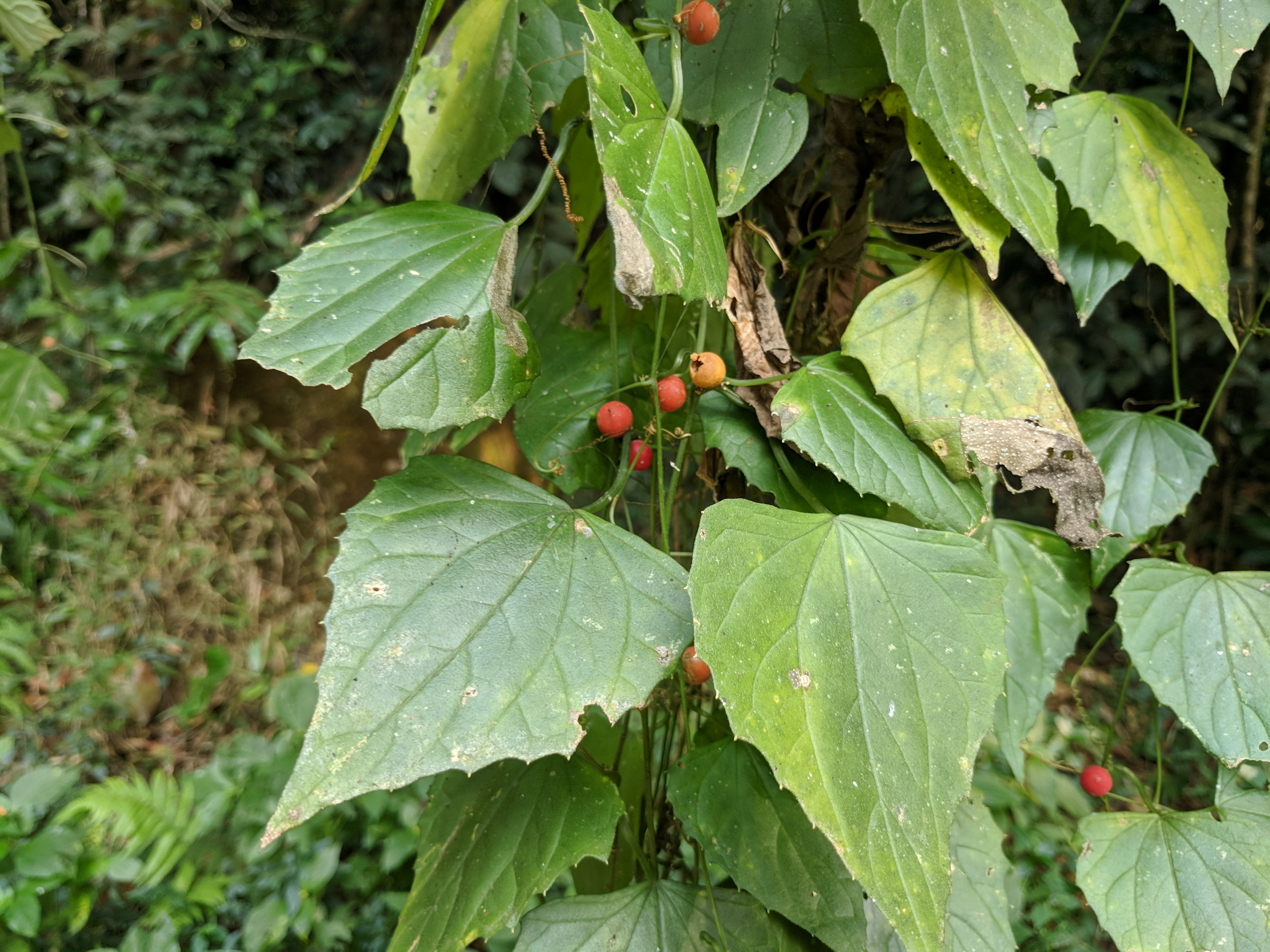

Scientific classification
- Kingdom: Plantae
- Clade: Tracheophytes
- Clade: Angiosperms
- Clade: Eudicots
- Clade: Rosids
- Order: Cucurbitales
- Family: Cucurbitaceae
- Genus: Zehneria
- Species: Z. maysorensis

Binomial name
- Zehneria maysorensis Arn.

Synonyms
- Bryonia mysorensis Wight & Arn.; Pilogyne maysorensis (Wight & Arn.) W.J.de Wilde & Duyfjes; Melothria maysorensis (Wight & Arn.) Chang; Melothria perpusilla var. deltifrons Ohwi; Zehneria lucida Hook.f.; Melothria lucida Cogn.; Melothria perpusilla var. subtruncata Cogn.; Pilogyne lucida Naudin; Zehneria maysorensis var. umbellata (Chakrav.) Kumari; Pilogyne lucida Naudin; Zehneria perpusilla var. deltifrons (Ohwi) H.Ohba; Zehneria maysorensis var. oblonga V.P.Prasad & M.Prasad

= Zehneria maysorensis =

Species of flowering plant

Zehneria maysorensis is a perennial climbing or trailing herb that belongs to the family Cucurbitaceae.

== Morphology ==
It is a climber with light greenish stem. Leaves are simple, dark green, glabrous, and coarsely toothed.

== Distribution ==
Himalayas, India, Sri Lanka, Indochina (except Thailand and Cambodia).

== Uses ==
Leaves are edible. Leaves are mixed with honey to kill stomach worms. Fruits are used as a blood purifier.
