= HMS Bryony =

Two ships of the Royal Navy have borne the name HMS Bryony, after the flower Bryony:

- HMS Bryony (1917) was an Anchusa-class sloop, launched in 1917 and broken up in 1938.
- HMS Bryony (K192) was a Flower-class corvette launched in 1941. She was sold in 1948 to the Norwegian government and renamed Polarfront II to be used as a weather ship. She was sold in 1979 and scrapped the following year.
