= Austrobryonia =

Scientific classification
- Kingdom: Plantae
- Clade: Embryophytes
- Clade: Tracheophytes
- Clade: Angiosperms
- Clade: Eudicots
- Clade: Rosids
- Order: Cucurbitales
- Family: Cucurbitaceae
- Genus: Austrobryonia; H.Schaef.

Genus of flowering plants

Austrobryonia is a genus of flowering plants belonging to the family Cucurbitaceae.

Its native range is Australia.

Species:

- Austrobryonia argillicola I.Telford
- Austrobryonia centralis I.Telford
- Austrobryonia micrantha (F.Muell.) I.Telford
- Austrobryonia pilbarensis I.Telford
