= Josef Zehner =

19th century botanical illustrator

- Known for: Botanical illustrator

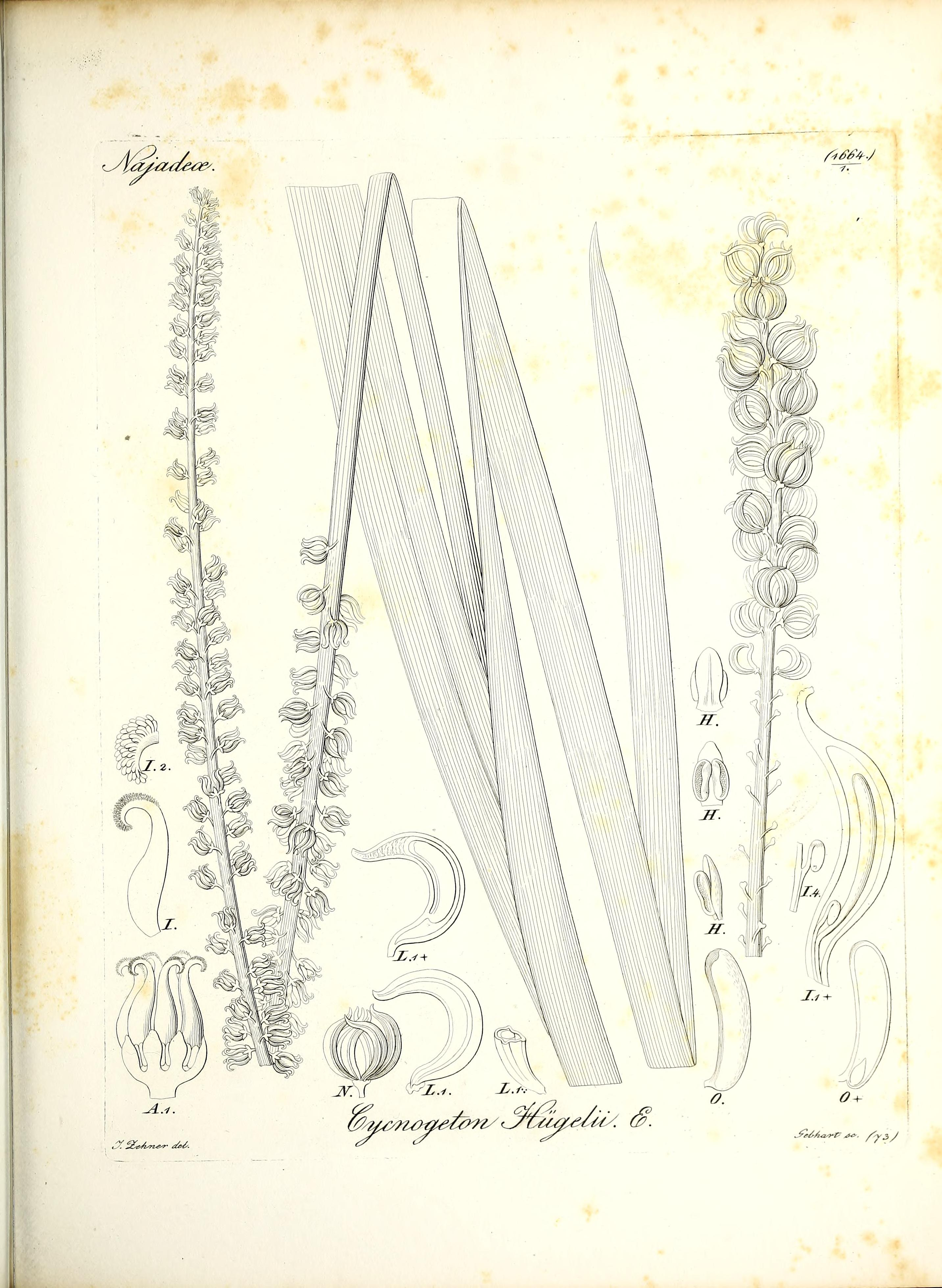
Triglochin huegelii (Endl.) Aston

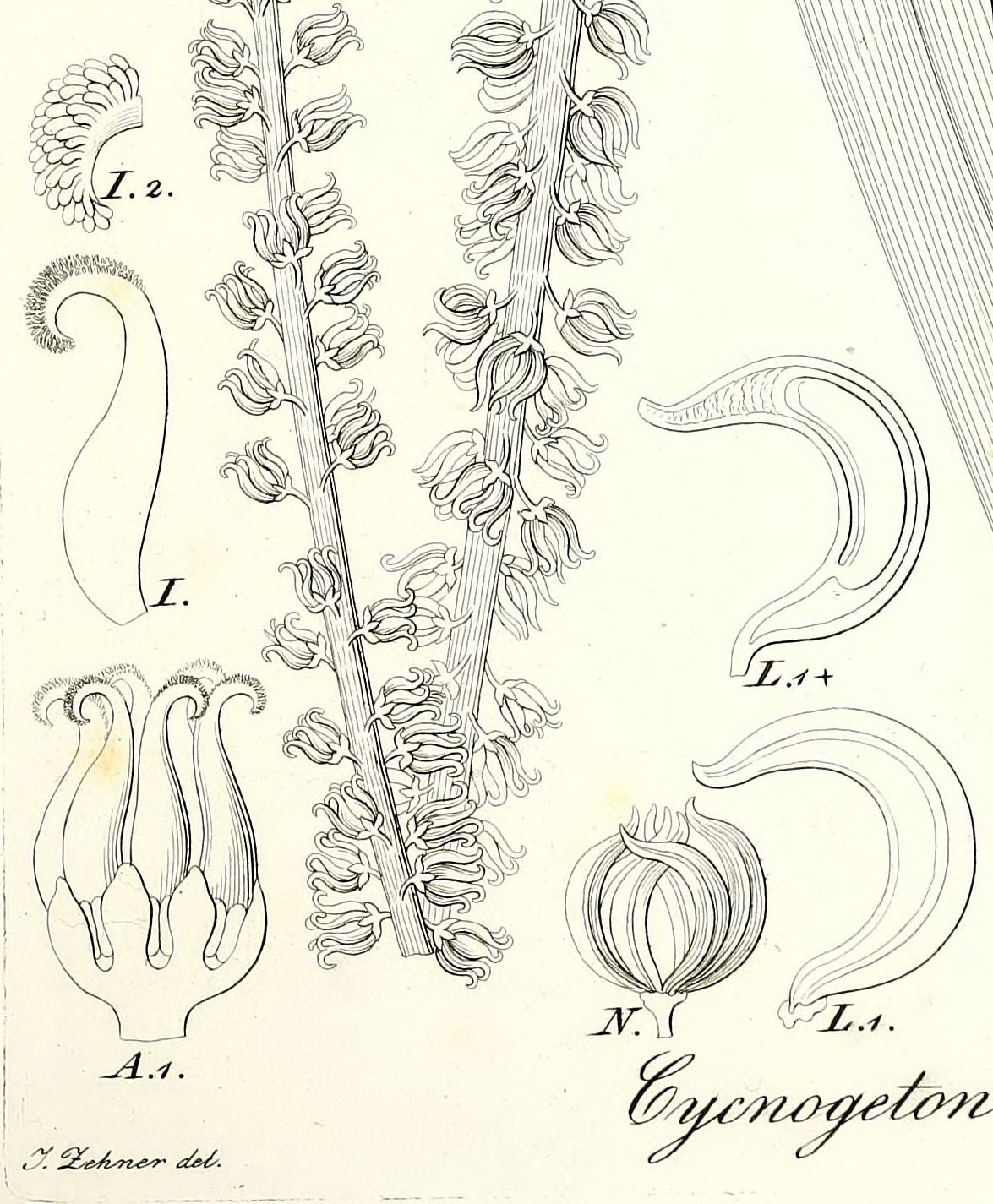
Detail of above plate

Josef Zehner aka Joseph Zehner (fl. 19th century) was an Austrian botanical illustrator. The plant genus Zehneria in the family Cucurbitaceae was named in his honour.

== Works in which his illustrations appear ==
- 'Versuch einer geognostisch-botanischen Darstellung der Flora der Vorwelt' (1820-1838)
- 'Genera plantarum secundum ordines naturales disposita' (1836-1840) - Stephan Endlicher 1804-1849
- 'Atakta botanica' (1833-1835) - Stephan Endlicher
