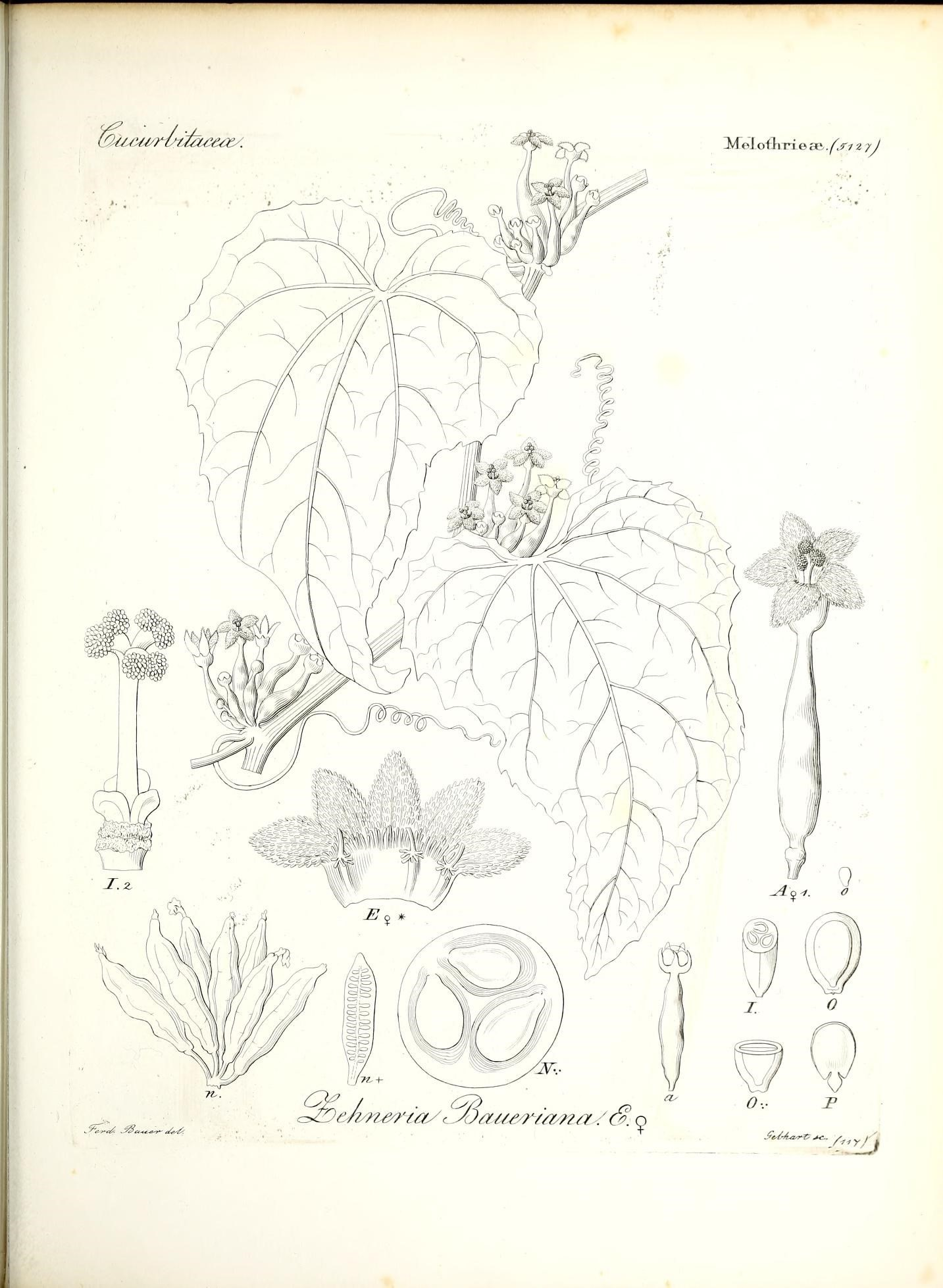

Conservation status
- Endangered (EPBC Act)

Scientific classification
- Kingdom: Plantae
- Clade: Tracheophytes
- Clade: Angiosperms
- Clade: Eudicots
- Clade: Rosids
- Order: Cucurbitales
- Family: Cucurbitaceae
- Genus: Zehneria
- Species: Z. baueriana

Binomial name
- Zehneria baueriana Endl.

= Zehneria baueriana =

Species of flowering plant

Zehneria baueriana, commonly known as the native cucumber or giant cucumber, is a species of flowering plant – a vine in the cucumber and gourd family, Cucurbitaceae. It is found on Norfolk Island, an Australian territory in the Tasman Sea, as well as in New Caledonia. The specific epithet honours Austrian botanical illustrator Ferdinand Bauer who collected on Norfolk Island in 1804 and 1805.

== Description ==
Zehneria baueriana is a large, perennial, dioecious liana, climbing to the forest canopy. The lower stems are woody and corky. The unlobed leaves are broadly ovate, 60–100 mm long and 50–80 mm wide; they are cordate at the base, finely denticulate, acute at the apex and scabrous above. Both male and female flowers occur in fascicles. The red, fleshy fruit is narrowly ellipsoidal and 15–20 mm long. The seeds are ovate with a narrow margin.

== Taxonomy ==
The vine is the type species of Zehneria. It has been sometimes considered conspecific with Zehneria mucronata Blume.

== Status and conservation ==
The vine is listed as endangered under Australia's Environment Protection and Biodiversity Conservation Act 1999.
