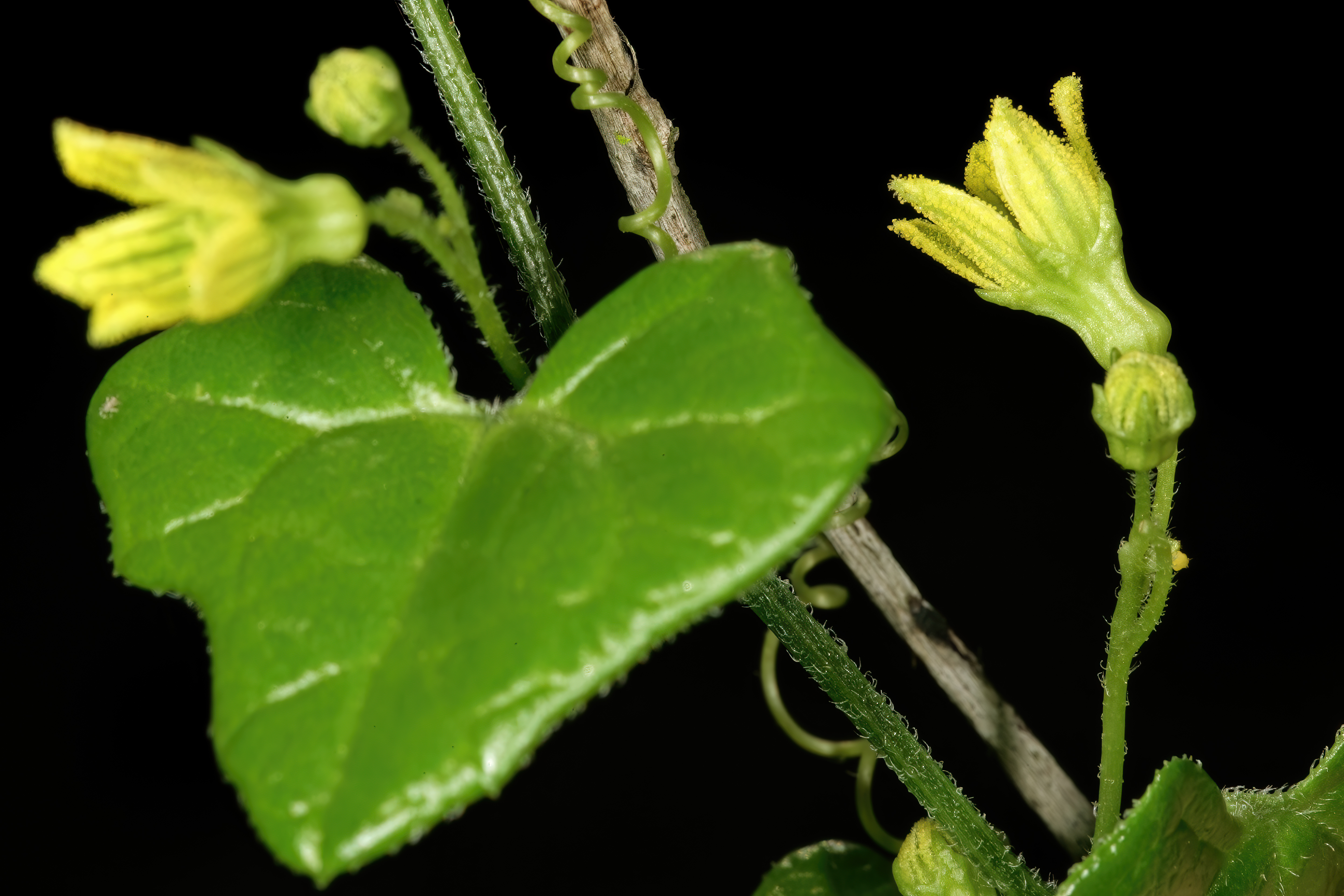
- Kedrostis nana var. nana

Scientific classification
- Kingdom: Plantae
- Clade: Tracheophytes
- Clade: Angiosperms
- Clade: Eudicots
- Clade: Rosids
- Order: Cucurbitales
- Family: Cucurbitaceae
- Genus: Kedrostis
- Species: K. nana

Binomial name
- Kedrostis nana (Lam.) Cogn.

= Kedrostis nana =

Species of plant

Kedrostis nana (or Ystervarkpatat) is a species of flowering plant in the family Cucurbitaceae, indigenous to scrub vegetation in the coastal areas of South Africa, from Saldanha in the west, along the coast as far east as KwaZulu-Natal.

== Description ==
It is a dioecious plant with leaves that are often almost entire and barely lobed (unlike its close relatives Kedrostis africana and Kedrostis capensis that are monoecious with deeply lobed leaves).

In its natural habitat, its greenish flowers are produced in February and March.

=== Varieties ===
Three varieties are recognised for this widespread and variable species, although they cannot always be clearly distinguished and many intermediate forms exist:

- Kedrostis nana var. nana. The type variety has leaves that are entire or not lobed deeper than halfway down the leaf's length. Distribution along the mesic coast from Saldanha in the west, to the Eastern Cape in the east.
- Kedrostis nana var. zeyheri. Leaves deeply lobed; upper side usually smooth. Leaf segments somewhat cuneate-to-rhomboid; often somewhat dentate. Distribution coastal or inland, from the Little Karoo in the west, to KwaZulu-Natal in the east.
- Kedrostis nana var. schlechteri. Leaves deeply lobed; upper side usually scabrid with pale pustules. Leaf segments variable (sometimes also lobed or ligulate). Distribution in dry areas near the coast from Riversdale in the west, to near Port Elizabeth in the east.
