= Zehneria alba =

Scientific classification
- Kingdom: Plantae
- Clade: Tracheophytes
- Clade: Angiosperms
- Clade: Eudicots
- Clade: Rosids
- Order: Cucurbitales
- Family: Cucurbitaceae
- Genus: Zehneria
- Species: Z. alba

Binomial name
- Zehneria alba Ridl.

Synonyms
- Melothria mucronata Cogn.; Zehneria mucronata Blume

Species of vine

Zehneria alba is a species of flowering plant in the cucumber and gourd family, Cucurbitaceae. It is endemic to Christmas Island, an Australian territory in the northeastern Indian Ocean. The specific epithet is from the Latin albus (white), referring to the colour of the flowers.

== Description ==
Zehneria alba is a dioecious vine with stems growing to 3 m in length. The leaves are broadly ovate, cordate at the base, unlobed to shallowly 3-lobed, dentate, acute to acuminate, and 50–80 mm long. The flowers are small and white; the male inflorescence is paniculate or racemose, 30–150 mm long, with a 10–130 mm long peduncle; the female flowers are solitary or clustered. The fruit is ellipsoidal, 20–30 mm long, with seeds about 4 mm long.

== Distribution and habitat ==
Found only on Christmas Island, the vine grows there both within the rainforest and along its shrubbed edges.

== Taxonomy ==
The vine is sometimes considered to be conspecific with Zehneria mucronata Blume.
