= Zehneria capillacea =

Scientific classification
- Kingdom: Plantae
- Clade: Tracheophytes
- Clade: Angiosperms
- Clade: Eudicots
- Clade: Rosids
- Order: Cucurbitales
- Family: Cucurbitaceae
- Genus: Zehneria
- Species: Z. capillacea

Binomial name
- Zehneria capillacea (Schumacher & Thonning) Jeffrey

Synonyms
- Broynia capillacea (Schumacher & Thonning); Melothria capillacea (Schumacher & Thonning) Cogniaux

Species of climbing plant

Zehneria capillacea is a herbaceous climbing herb of the Cucurbitaceae family native to many countries in West and Central Africa.

== Description ==
The plant is a slender climbing herb that can grow up to 30 cm (12 in). The leaf outline is triangular with a hastate base and a deep green color. The fruit shape is elliptical and color is usually green or dark green.

== Uses ==
Leaf extracts from the herb are used as ingredients to prepare certain vegetable soups in the Niger Delta region of Nigeria.
