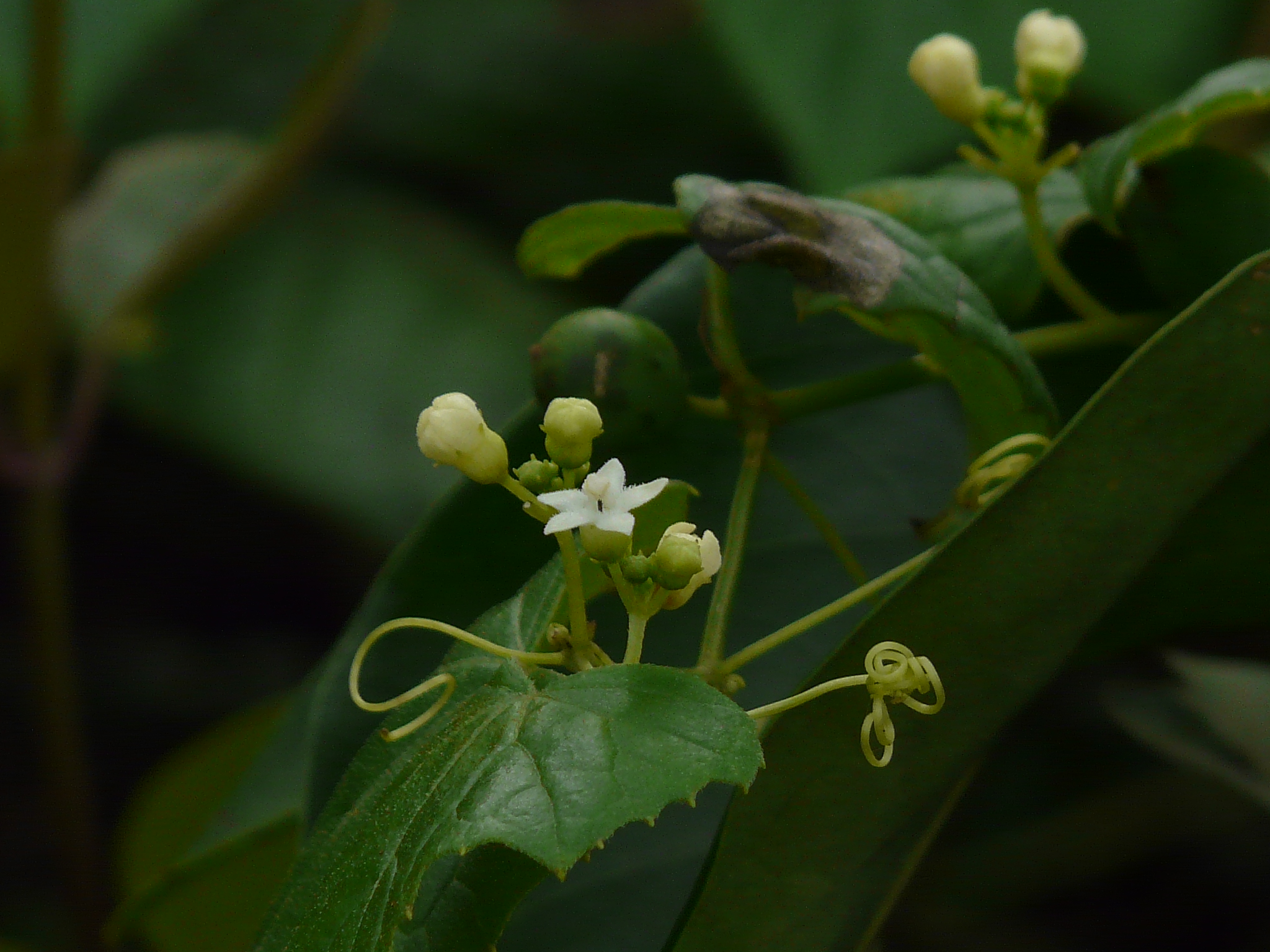

Scientific classification
- Kingdom: Plantae
- Clade: Tracheophytes
- Clade: Angiosperms
- Clade: Eudicots
- Clade: Rosids
- Order: Cucurbitales
- Family: Cucurbitaceae
- Genus: Zehneria
- Species: Z. scabra

Binomial name
- Zehneria scabra (Linn.f.) Sond

= Zehneria scabra =

Species of climbing plant

Zehneria scabra is a perennial climbing or trailing herb that belong to the family Cucurbitaceae.

== Morphology ==
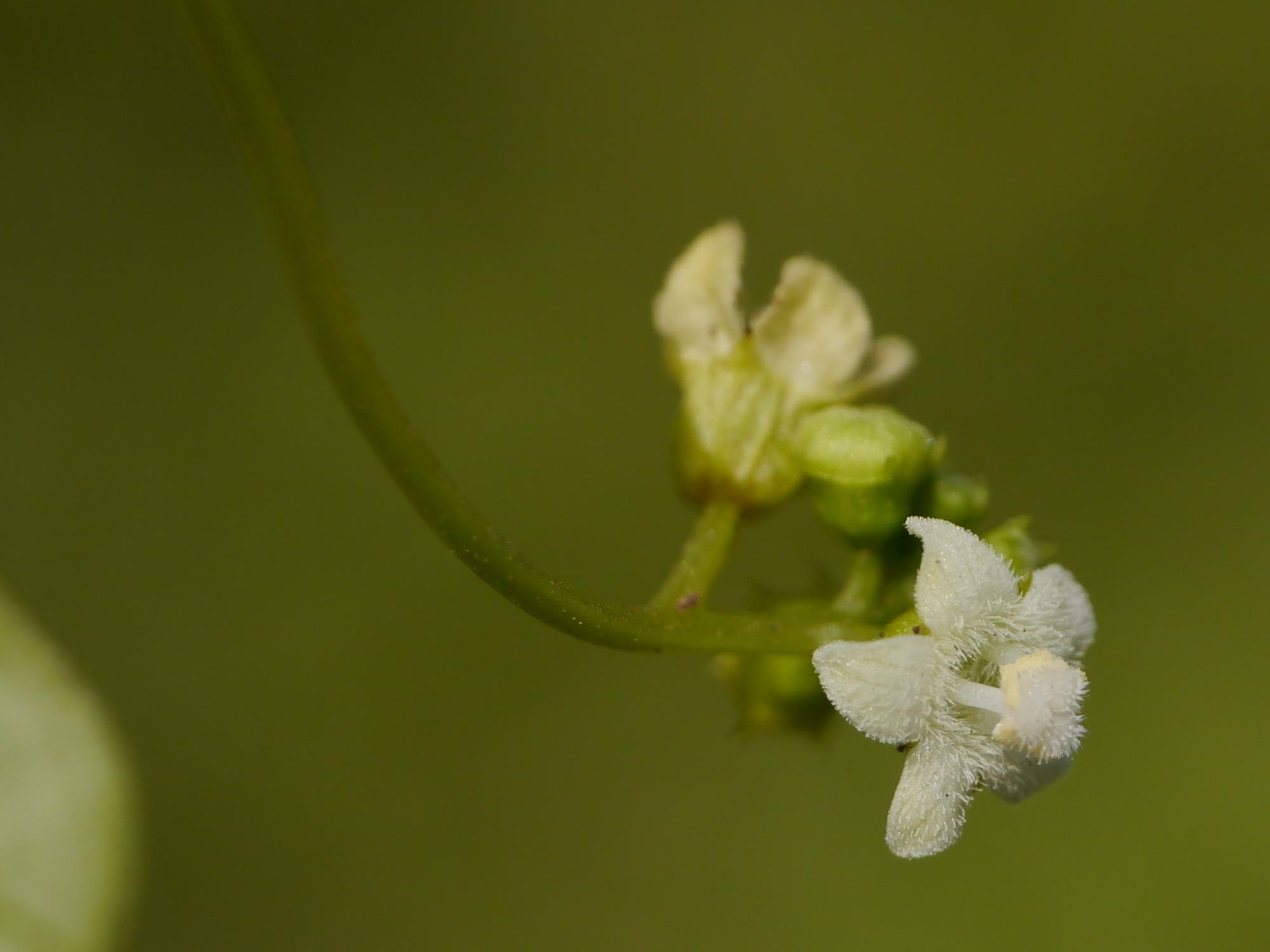
Closeup of flowers.

The herb can climb up to 10 m (33 ft) long. The older parts of the stems are woody with corky-ridged bark. Its leaves are triangular to ovate in shape, cordate at the base, deep green, and scabrid punctate above. The fruit is oval shaped and bright red.

== Distribution ==
The plant is widely distributed in Tropical Africa, and present in Madagascar, India, and in Java, Indonesia.

== Uses ==
In Ethiopia, the herb is known locally as 'hareg ressa' where its fruits and leaves are crushed and oil extracted used to treat scabies. Extracts from the herb are traditionally used to treat diarrhea, alopecia, wound and eczema. Oil extracts are also used to treat skin related infections among the Pare of Tanzania.
