= Kedrostis africana =

Scientific classification
- Kingdom: Plantae
- Clade: Tracheophytes
- Clade: Angiosperms
- Clade: Eudicots
- Clade: Rosids
- Order: Cucurbitales
- Family: Cucurbitaceae
- Genus: Kedrostis
- Species: K. africana

Binomial name
- Kedrostis africana (L.) Cogn.

Synonyms
- Bryonia africana L.; Coniandra africana (L.) Sond.; Rhynchocarpa africana Asch. in Schweinf.

Species of plant

Kedrostis africana
Nutritional value per 100 g (3.5 oz)
- Energy: 934.58 kJ (223.37 kcal)
- Carbohydrates: 46.36 g
- Dietary fibre: 25.52 g
- Fat: 1.12 g
- Protein: 6.95 g
Vitamins and minerals
Minerals	Quantity %DV^{†}
Calcium	193% 2505 mg
Copper	11% 0.1 mg
Iron	499% 89.9 mg
Magnesium	115% 485 mg
Manganese	135% 3.1 mg
Phosphorus	19% 240 mg
Potassium	74% 2225 mg
Sodium	19% 430 mg
Zinc	44% 4.8 mg
- This data is derived from a nutritional evaluation.
- ^{†}Percentages estimated using US recommendations for adults, except for potassium, which is estimated based on expert recommendation from the National Academies.

Kedrostis africana (or baboon's cucumber) is a species of flowering plant in the family Cucurbitaceae. It is native to Namibia and South Africa.

== Description ==
It is a succulent monoecious plant, with a large underground tuber, called a caudex which can span to lengths of up to 50 cm. This caudex is a store of water, which enables the plant to be somewhat resistant to droughts.

It develops long climbing stems that reach between 1 – 6m in length. Its lobed leaves are between 6 – 10 cm long.

Baboon's cucumbers form short racemes consisting of 1–12 male flowers. Their petals are light cream to green-yellow coloured. Female flowers are not grouped like male flowers and are also light cream to green-yellow. They bloom during the summer.

They also bear orange fruit, with a diameter between 8 – 15mm.

=== Related species ===
Kedrostis africana is often confused with its relatives in the same genus.

It can be distinguished from Kedrostis capensis by its more glabrous leaves and its much smaller flowers with male and female flowers developing in the same axils. The flowers of K. capensis also usually appear before the leaves do.

It can be distinguished from Kedrostis nana by its being monoecious, with more herbaceous leaves that are deeply pinnate and dissected.

== Distribution ==
This species is indigenous to southern Africa, occurring from Namibia in the north west, southwards as far as Worcester and the Gourits River valley, through the Karoo as far as Port Elizabeth in the south east, and northwards to KwaZulu-Natal and Mpumalanga in the north east.

== Cultivation ==
This species can be propagated with seeds or cuttings. Because they can produce separate male and female flowers on the same plant, they are self-fertile. This also allows their orange fruit to readily show. They also grow very slowly.

This plant should be protected from drought, frost and excessive sunlight. Baboon's cucumbers should be grown in well-drained soil, with lots of water during the growing season. Providing with warmth and fertiliser during its active will also speed up its growth.

During the summer, water regularly, but not during autumn or winter as this could leave it vulnerable to rotting. It should also be kept above 0 °C.

Because it's a climber, the stems will need some support.

It has gained the Royal Horticultural Society's Award of Garden Merit as an ornamental.

== Uses ==
=== Traditional Medicine ===
Kedrostis africana is used to induce vomiting, urination, the prevention of fluid retention. It is also used to treat syphilis. A decoction of the crushed bulb is taken to manage obesity.
