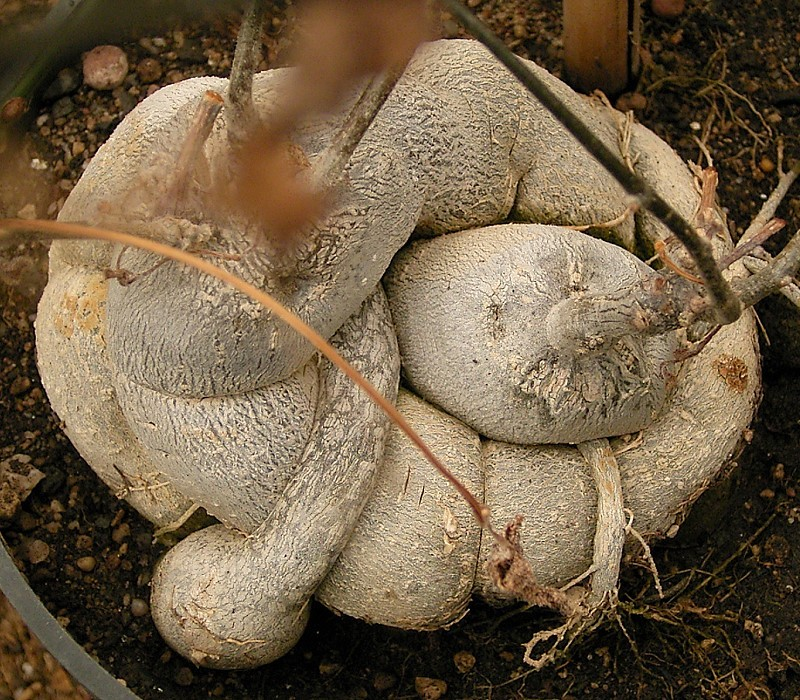
- Kedrostis nana

Scientific classification
- Kingdom: Plantae
- Clade: Tracheophytes
- Clade: Angiosperms
- Clade: Eudicots
- Clade: Rosids
- Order: Cucurbitales
- Family: Cucurbitaceae
- Subfamily: Cucurbitoideae
- Tribe: Coniandreae
- Genus: Kedrostis; Medik.

Synonyms
- Rhynchocarpa Schrad. ex Endl. 1839

= Kedrostis =

Genus of flowering plants

Kedrostis is a genus of ± 35 species climbing or trailing herbs in the family Cucurbitaceae. Its native range is tropical Africa and Asia.

== Species ==
1. Kedrostis abdallai A. Zimmermann
2. Kedrostis africana (L.) Cogn.
3. Kedrostis bennettii (Miq.) W.J.de Wilde & Duyfjes
4. Kedrostis capensis (Sond.) A. Meeuse
5. Kedrostis cogniauxii Keraudr.
6. Kedrostis courtallensis (Arn.) C. Jeffrey
7. Kedrostis crassirostrata Bremek.
8. Kedrostis dissecta Keraudr.
9. Kedrostis elongata Keraudr.
10. Kedrostis foetidissima (Jacq.) Cogn.
11. Kedrostis heterophylla Zimmermann
12. Kedrostis hirta W.J.de Wilde & Duyfjes
13. Kedrostis hirtella (Naud.) Cogn.
14. Kedrostis lanuginosa Keraudr.
15. Kedrostis laxa Keraudr.
16. Kedrostis leloja (Forssk. ex J.F.Gmel.) C. Jeffrey
17. Kedrostis limpompensis C. Jeffrey
18. Kedrostis monosperma W.J.de Wilde & Duyfjes
19. Kedrostis nana (Lam.) Cogn.
20. Kedrostis nana var. schlechteri (Cogn.) A. Meeuse
21. Kedrostis nana var. zeyheri (Schrad.) A. Meeuse
22. Kedrostis perrieri Keraudr.
23. Kedrostis psammophila P. Bruyns
24. Kedrostis pseudogijef (Gilg) C. Jeffrey
