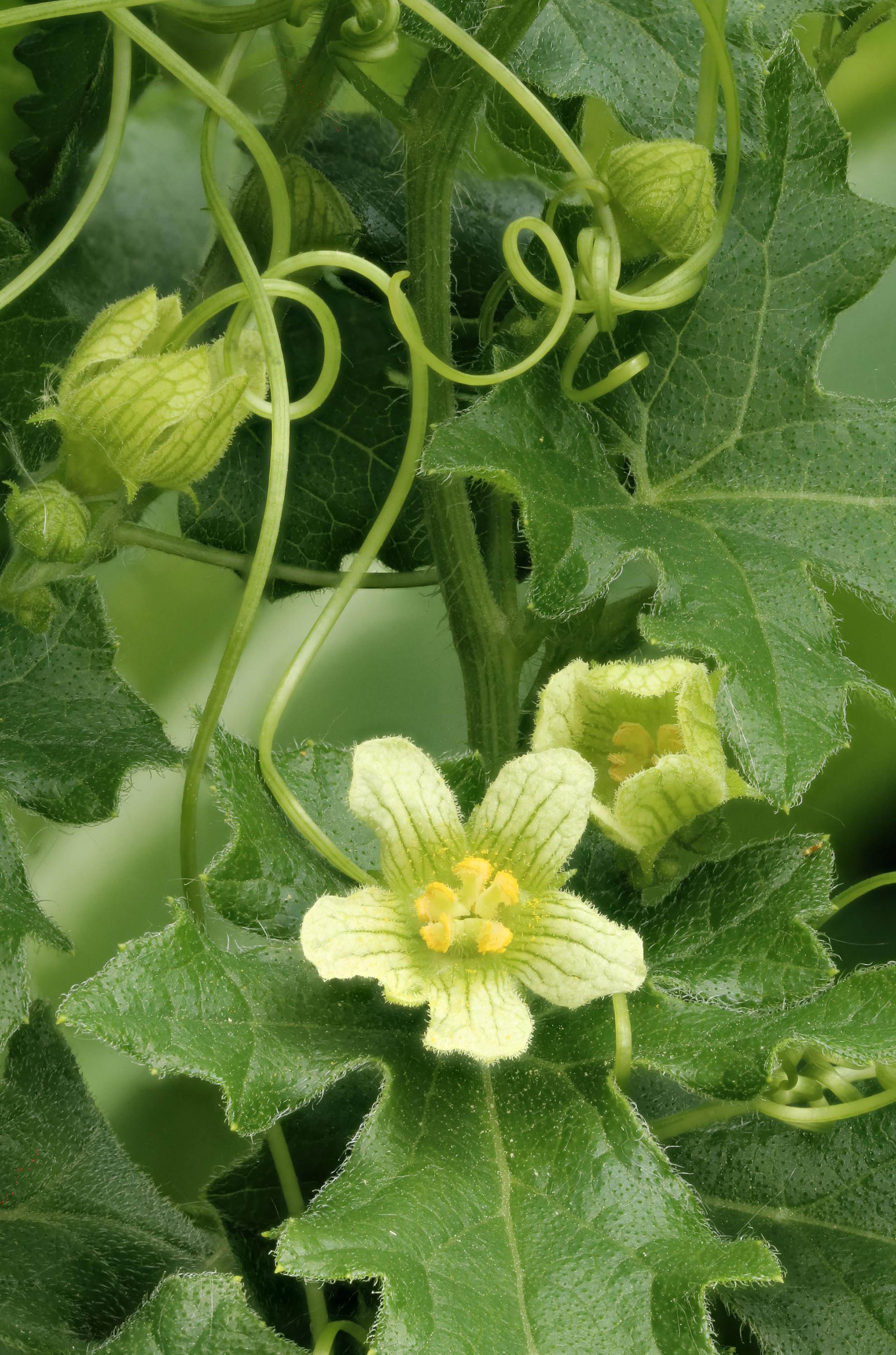

Scientific classification
- Kingdom: Plantae
- Clade: Embryophytes
- Clade: Tracheophytes
- Clade: Angiosperms
- Clade: Eudicots
- Clade: Rosids
- Order: Cucurbitales
- Family: Cucurbitaceae
- Genus: Bryonia
- Species: B. cretica

Binomial name
- Bryonia cretica L. (1753)

Subspecies
- Bryonia cretica subsp. acuta (Desf.) Tutin; Bryonia cretica subsp. cretica; Bryonia cretica subsp. dioica (Jacq.) Tutin; Bryonia cretica subsp. marmorata (E.Petit) Jauzein

= Bryonia cretica =

Species of plant

Bryonia cretica, also known as Cretan bryony or English mandrake, is a perennial species of Bryonia.

Its flowers bloom in the summer and usually grow between 3 and 5mm. Its fruit are toxic. They have been used in traditional medicine.

It is a common plant in most of Europe, North Africa, the Middle East and Turkmenistan.

== Subspecies ==
Four subspecies are accepted.

- Bryonia cretica subsp. acuta (Desf.) Tutin – Algeria, Tunisia, Libya, and Lampedusa
- Bryonia cretica subsp. cretica – eastern Mediterranean, from Greece to Turkey, the Levant, Egypt, and Libya
- Bryonia cretica subsp. dioica (Jacq.) Tutin – central and southern Europe, Great Britain, and North Africa
- Bryonia cretica subsp. marmorata (E.Petit) Jauzein – Corsica and Sardinia
