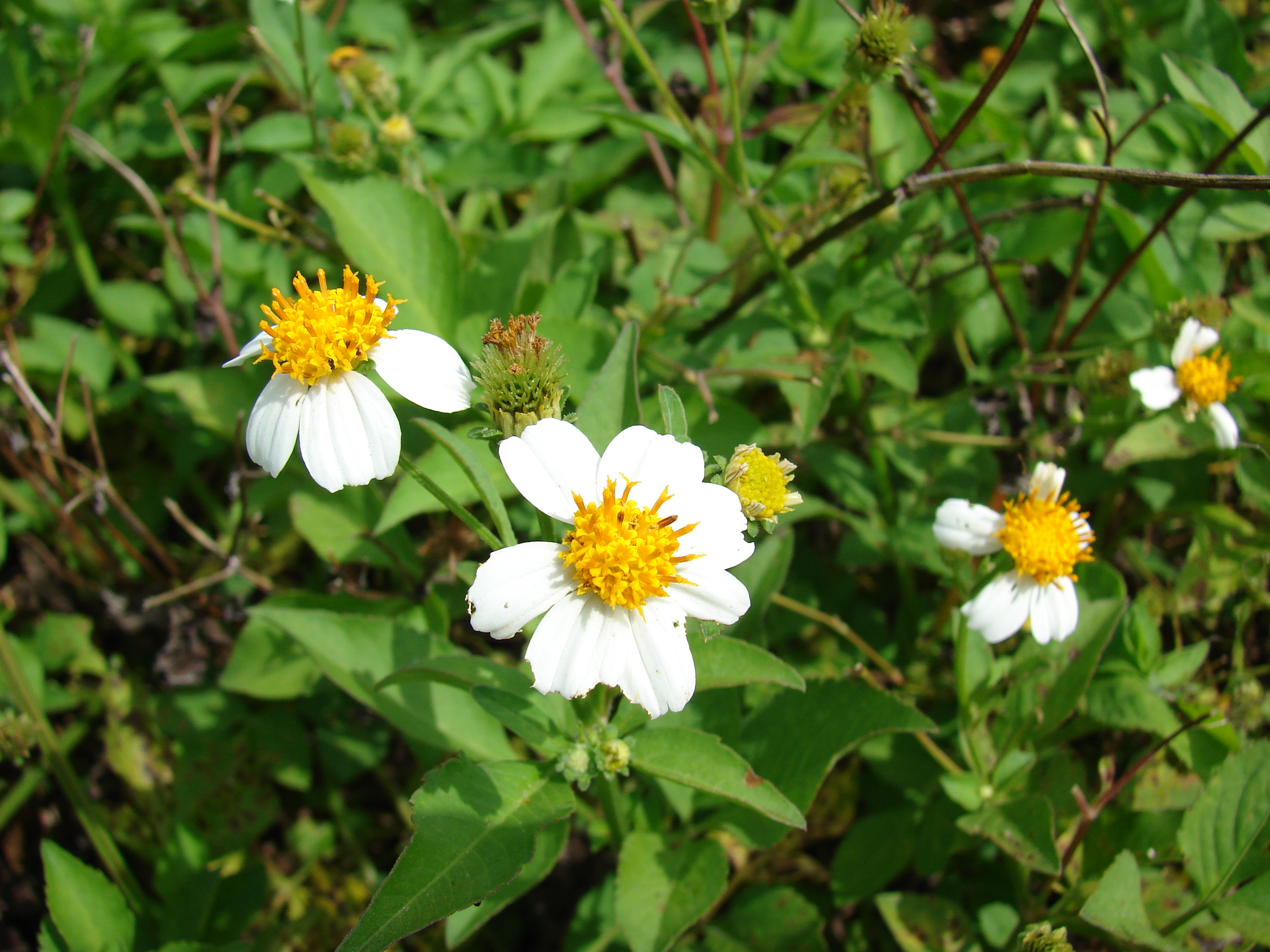

Scientific classification
- Kingdom: Plantae
- Clade: Embryophytes
- Clade: Tracheophytes
- Clade: Angiosperms
- Clade: Eudicots
- Clade: Asterids
- Order: Asterales
- Family: Asteraceae
- Genus: Bidens
- Species: B. alba

Binomial name
- Bidens alba (L.) DC.

Synonyms
- Coreopsis alba L.

= Bidens alba =

Species of flowering plant in the daisy family

Bidens alba is a species of flowering plant in the family Asteraceae, commonly known as shepherd's needles, beggarticks, Spanish needles, or butterfly needles. Bidens means two- toothed, describing the two projections found at the top of the seeds, and alba refers to the white ray florets. This plant is found in tropical and subtropical regions of North America, Asia, South America, and Africa, situated in gardens, road sides, farm fields and disturbed sites. B. alba is an annual or short-lived perennial, which is considered a weed in the United States. However, B. alba leaves are edible and can be used as medicinal remedies.

== Description ==
Bidens alba is a vascular plant. It has a similar root and stem system to others in the dicot family Asteraceae. After germinating, the roots progress into a tap root that grows vertically in the ground. The primary tissue of the apical meristems increases the length of the plant and the secondary roots of the lateral meristems give rise to the width. B. alba grows to a height of approximately five feet.

The stem of B. alba plant emerges from the taproot, yet the bent stem at the base also has the ability to grow into roots at the lower nodes. Stems are mostly hairless and green to purplish in color. The vascular bundle provides nutrients throughout the plant, with the xylem transporting water from the roots and the phloem obtaining food from the leaves.

Bidens alba leaves, which are simple on the opposite side and compound on the underneath, are 2–10 centimetres (1–4 in) long and 1.0–3.5 cm (3/8–1 3/8 in) wide. The underside leaf is hairy, and has toothed edges. The leaves may be lobed, depending on the species. Some have teeth and some do not; each node produces two leaves along the stem.

Each flowering head of B. alba, which is small, appears in radial symmetry. The flowers on this plant are depicted as daisy-like due to the larger white petals and the very small yellow flowers which are located at the end of the branches. Colors of the flower-heads of Bidens alba vary depending on the subspecies; some B. alba have yellow, tubular central blossoms and others may have flower-heads with white or cream petals (1.5 cm or 5/8 in long); eventually they form black linear seeds, yielding approximately 1200 seeds per plant.

== Cultivation ==
Bidens alba is a fast-growing, fast-spreading weed due to its enormous number of seeds and the ability to re-grow from stems. In sub-tropical to tropical conditions, B. alba can grow almost everywhere in full sun with little or no moisture. The most growth occurs in organic matter with loose soil; however, they can also propagate well on sand and lime-rocks in non-irrigated habitats. The seeds are dispersed mainly by animals or humans, although some are also carried by wind and water.

== Uses ==
Bidens alba provide a nectar source for butterflies and honey-bees.

Bidens is a nutrient dense wild plant, boasting a similar nutrient profile to kale; high in fiber and proteins, carotenes, folate, and magnesium. People in South Africa, Zulus, and Indians consume the fresh or dried leaves by boiling them. Young leaves of B. alba may also be eaten as a salad. Bidens alba contains saponins, so older leaves may be unpleasant to the taste and may upset the stomach.

The dried leaves of the B. alba also make a good tobacco substitute.
