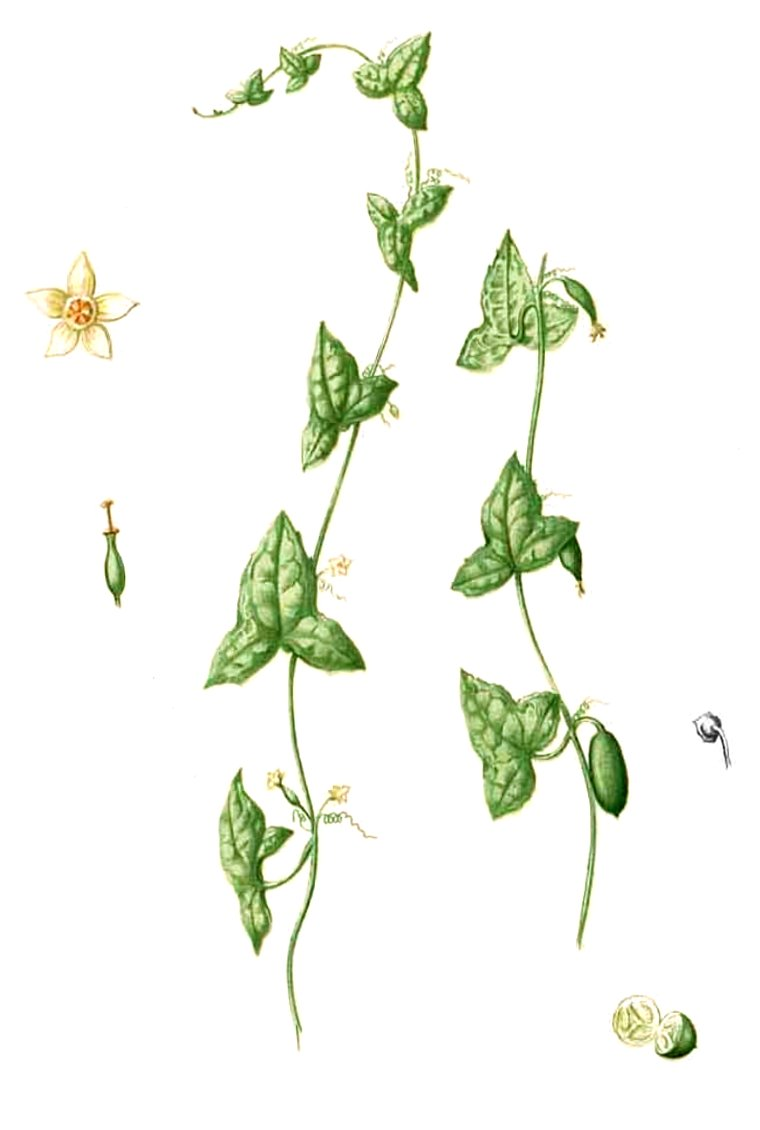
- Plate of Zehneria indica in Francisco Manuel Blanco’s Flora de Filipinas, 1880-1883

Scientific classification
- Kingdom: Plantae
- Clade: Tracheophytes
- Clade: Angiosperms
- Clade: Eudicots
- Clade: Rosids
- Order: Cucurbitales
- Family: Cucurbitaceae
- Subfamily: Cucurbitoideae
- Tribe: Benincaseae
- Genus: Zehneria; Endl.

Species
- See text

= Zehneria =

Genus of flowering plants

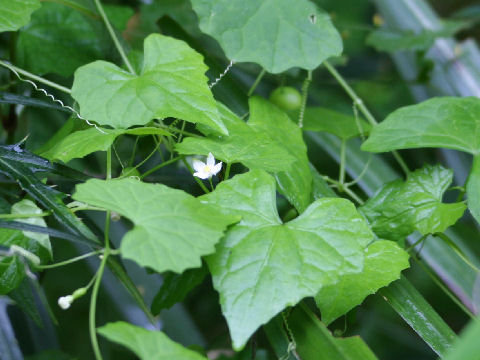
Leaves and flowers of Zehneria japonica

Zehneria is a genus of flowering plants – of vines in the cucumber and gourd family, Cucurbitaceae. It contains about 35 species ranging from Africa, through Southeast Asia to Australia and Oceania. The name honours botanical artist Joseph Zehner.

== Description ==
Zehneria species are either monoecious or dioecious, annual or perennial, climbing vines. Their leaves are simple, dentate and usually palmately lobed. Inflorescences grow on axillary racemes, with the flowers normally clustered, occasionally solitary. The fruit is fleshy, usually globose or ellipsoidal, and indehiscent. The seeds are obovate, compressed and smooth.

== Selected species ==
- Zehneria alba Ridl.
- Zehneria baueriana Endl.
- Zehneria bodinieri (H. Lév.) W. J. de Wilde & Duyfjes
- Zehneria brevirostris W. J. de Wilde & Duyfjes
- Zehneria capillacea (Schumacher & Thonning) Jeffrey
- Zehneria cunninghamii F.Muell.
- Zehneria ejecta F. M. Bailey
- Zehneria hermaphrodita W. J. de Wilde & Duyfjes
- Zehneria indica (Lour.) Keraudren
- Zehneria japonica (Thunb.) H. Y. Liu
- Zehneria marginata (Blume) Keraudren
- Zehneria marlothii (Cogn.) R. Fern. & A. Fern.
- Zehneria maysorensis Wight. & Arn.
- Zehneria microsperma Hook. f.
- Zehneria minutiflora (Cogn.) C. Jeffrey
- Zehneria mucronata (Blume) Miq.
- Zehneria repanda (Blume) Simmons
- Zehneria scabra (L.f.) Sond.
- Zehneria scabrella F. Muell.
- Zehneria sphaerosperma W. J. de Wilde & Duyfjes
- Zehneria tenuispica W. J. de Wilde & Duyfjes
- Zehneria thwaitesii (Schweinf.) C. Jeffrey
- Zehneria wallichii (C. B. Clarke) C. Jeffrey

== Gallery ==
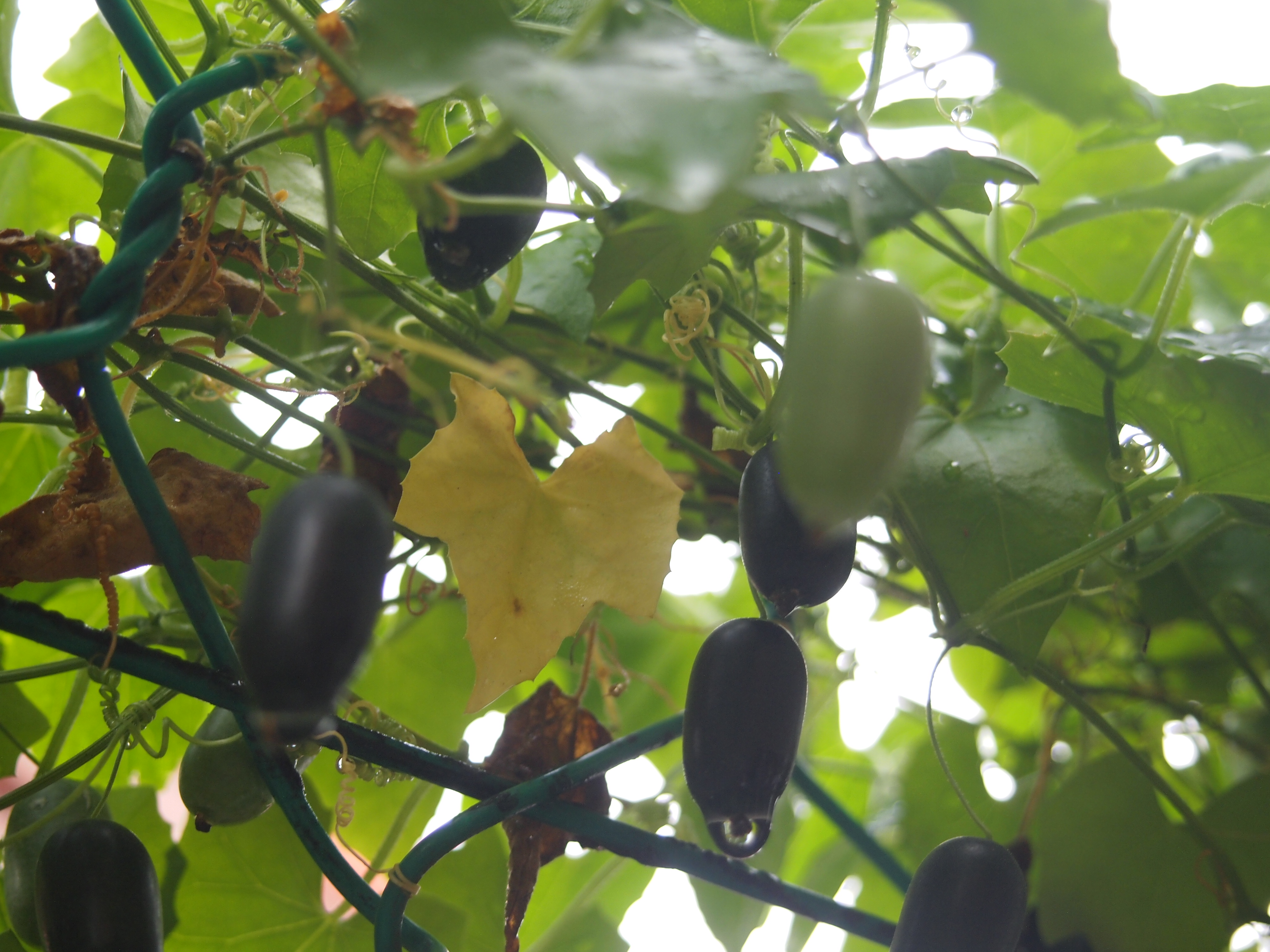
Zehneria grown in Malaysia

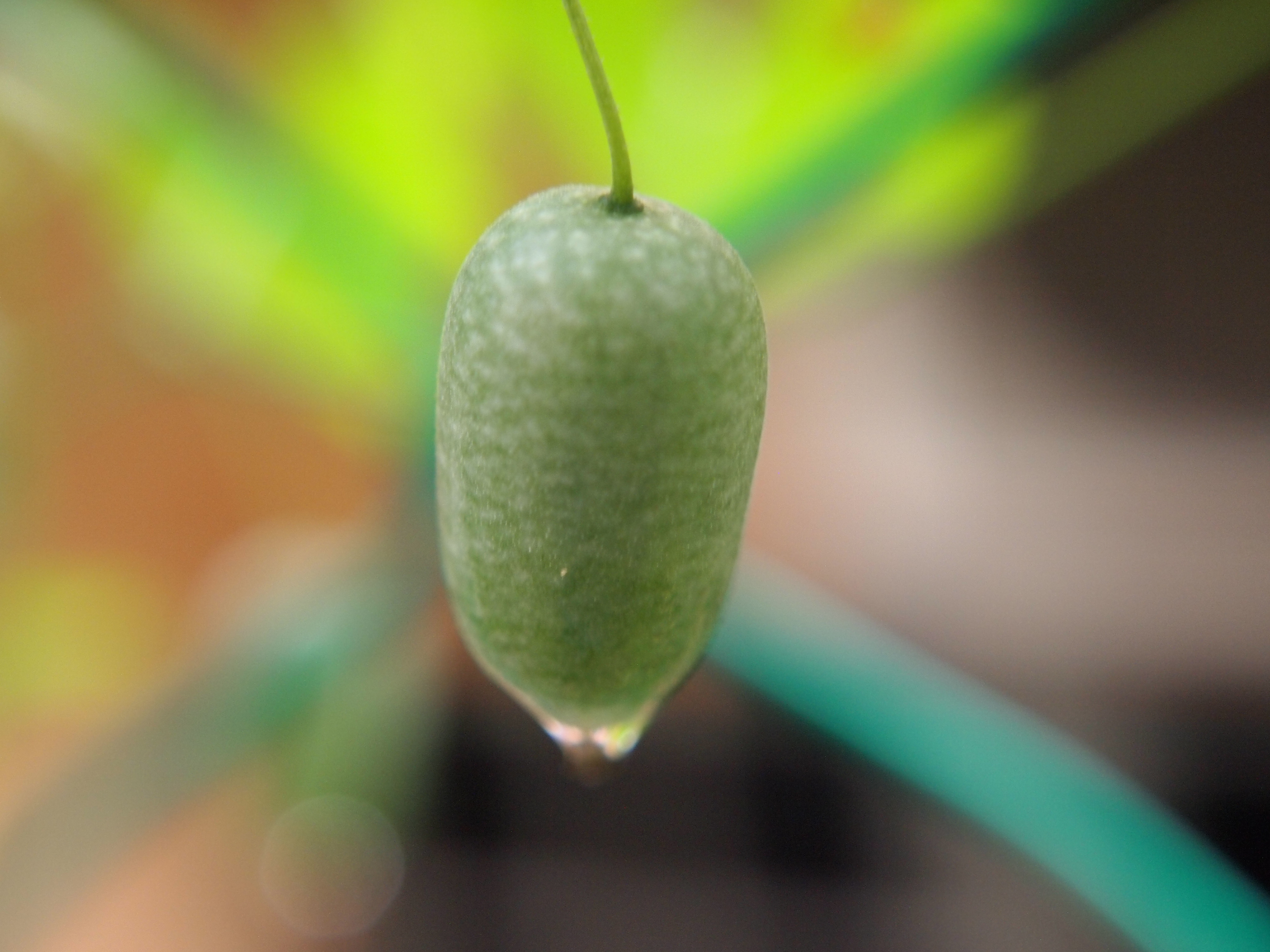
Close-up of a Zehneria fruit

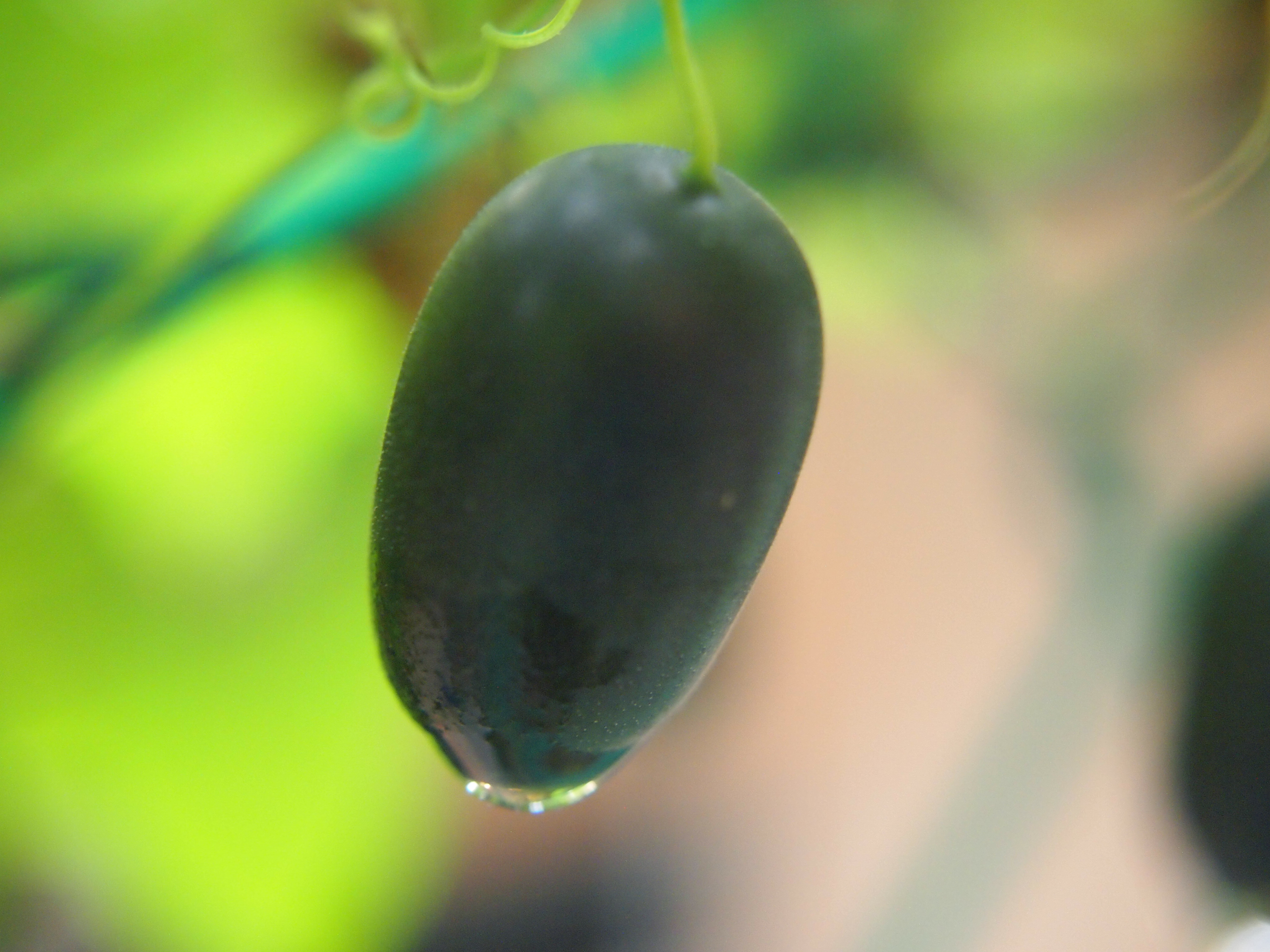
Matured Zehneria is black in color
