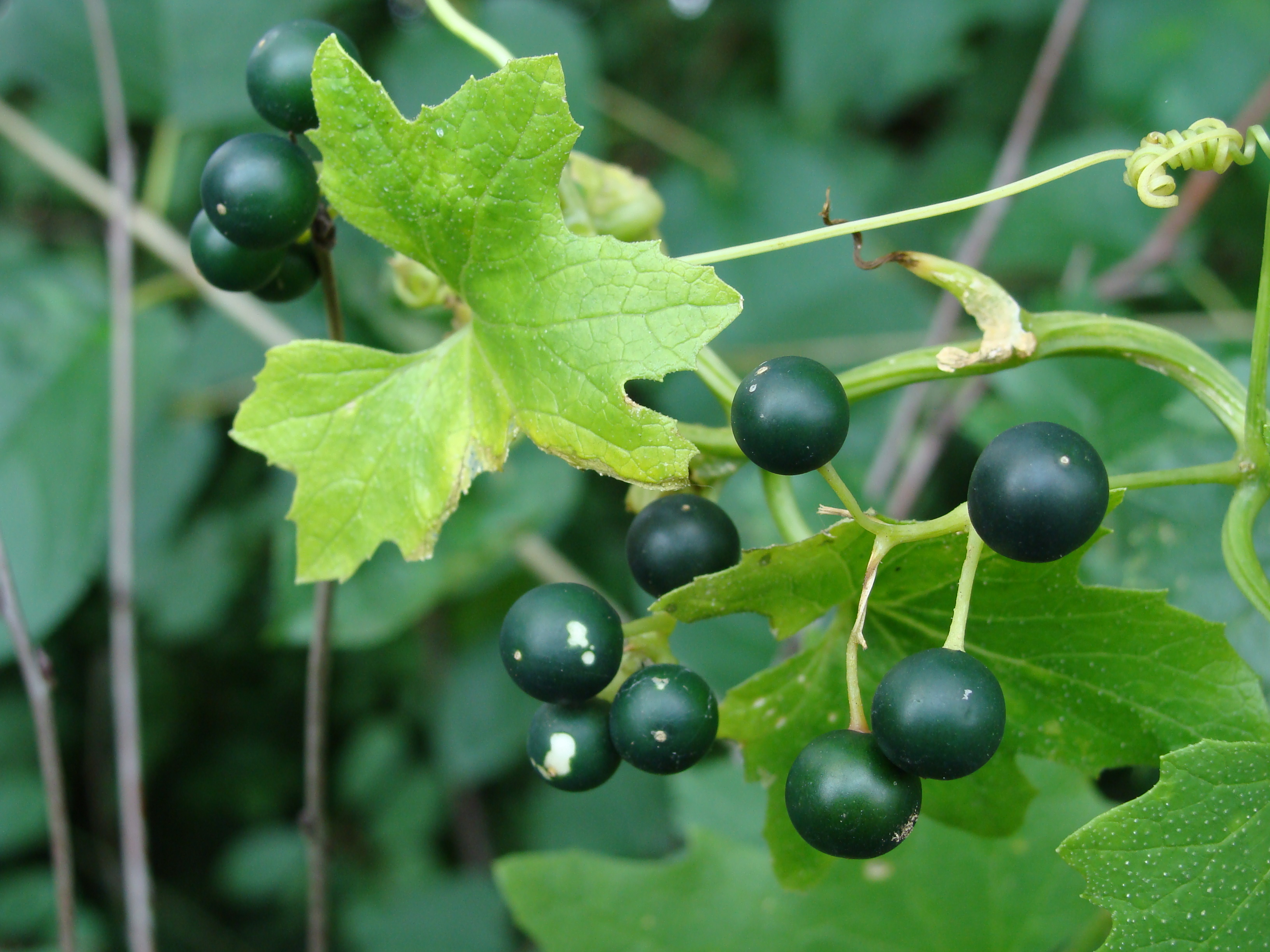
- Mature foliage and berries

Scientific classification
- Kingdom: Plantae
- Clade: Embryophytes
- Clade: Tracheophytes
- Clade: Spermatophytes
- Clade: Angiosperms
- Clade: Eudicots
- Clade: Rosids
- Order: Cucurbitales
- Family: Cucurbitaceae
- Genus: Bryonia
- Species: B. alba

Binomial name
- Bryonia alba L.

Synonyms
- Bryonia dioica M.Bieb. nom. illeg.; Bryonia monoeca E.H.L.Krause nom. illeg.; Bryonia nigra Gilib. nom. inval.; Bryonia vulgaris Gueldenst. ex Ledeb.

= Bryonia alba =

Species of plant

Bryonia alba, known by the common name white bryony, is a vigorous vine in the family Cucurbitaceae, found in Europe and Northern Iran. It has a growth habit similar to kudzu, which gives it a highly destructive potential outside its native range as a noxious weed. Other common names include false mandrake, English mandrake, wild vine, wild nep, tamus, ladies' seal, and tetterbury.

== Description ==
An herbaceous, perennial vine of the cucumber family, white bryony is monoecious but diclinous (separate male and female flowers found on the same plant) with a tuberous yellow root. Greenish-white flowers are 1 cm (0.39 in) across. Long curling tendrils, flowers, and fruit all stem from axils of palmately lobed leaves. The fruit is a 1.5 cm (0.59 in) berry which blackens as it ripens.

== Distribution ==
White bryony is native to Europe and Northern Iran. It has also been introduced to the United States, where it is listed as a noxious weed in Washington, Idaho.

== Ecology ==
Birds are the most common dispersal mechanism for this plant. They deposit seeds where they eat and nest, and so bryony is prevalent in native hawthorn patches and in windbreak, shelterbelt, riparian buffer, and wildlife plantings. Bryonia alba leaves may be used as a food plant by the larvae of cabbage moths.

== Toxicity ==
All parts of Bryonia alba contain bryonin which is poisonous and may cause illness or death. Livestock may also be poisoned by consuming the fruit and leaves. Forty berries constitutes a lethal dose for adult humans.

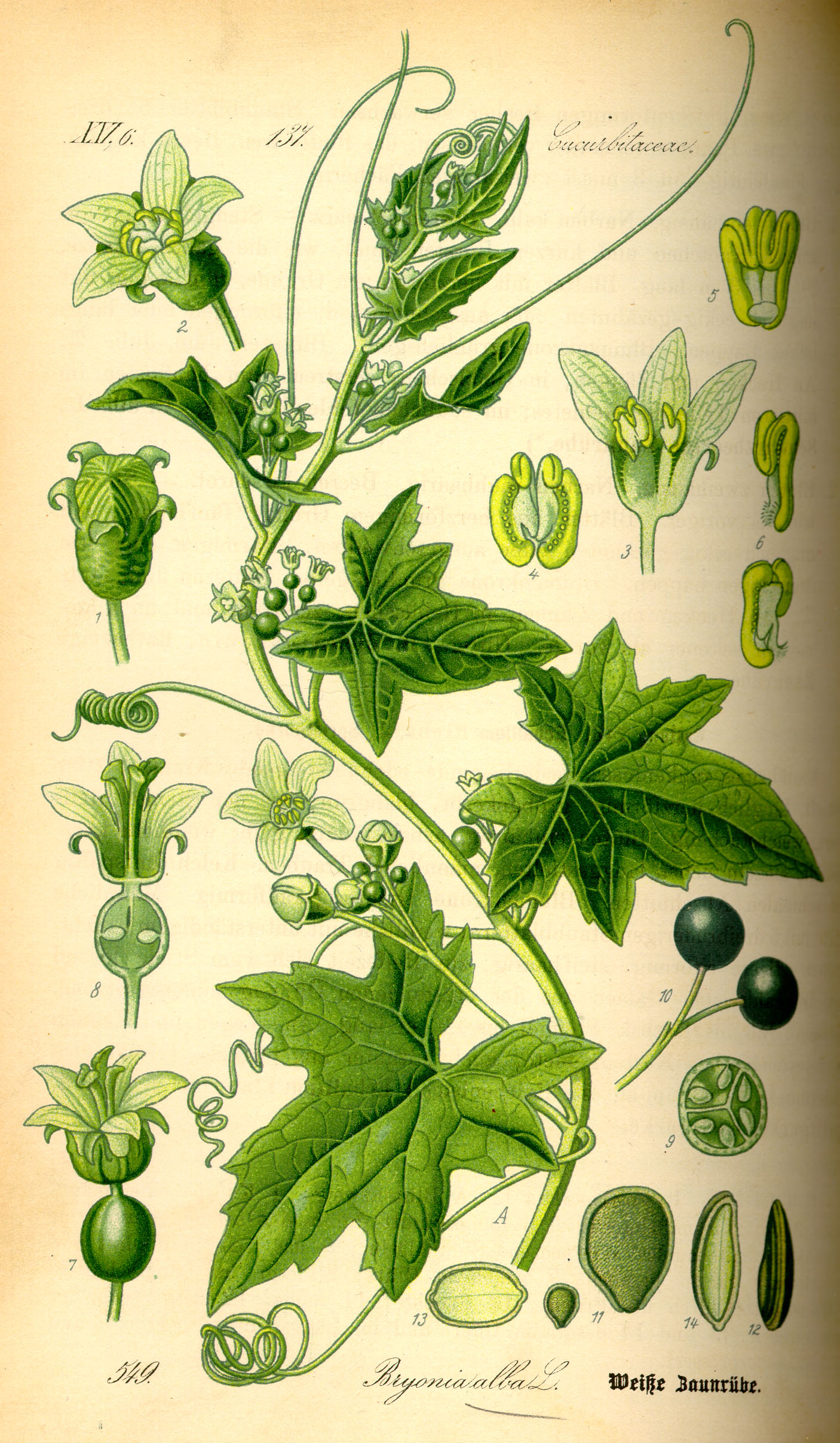

== Invasive species ==
Outside of its native range, this vine is often a very aggressive invasive weed. It can produce three vines at a time, which each grow up to 15 cm (5.9 in) per day. It has a climbing growth pattern similar to kudzu, and will grow into a dense mat when it cannot climb. Once established, it will climb other plants and trees as well as fences and buildings, blocking the sun and even rain from its host. Winter snow or heavy rains weighing down the mat of foliage create extra weight, leading to breakage of host limbs or even felling of entire host trees.

Control of white bryony usually involves manual pulling and very frequent removal of new growth, diligence being the key to success. Plants may be killed manually by severing the roots 7–10 cm (2.8–3.9 in) below ground surface to remove the crown and prevent re-sprouting. Tillage is often ineffective and can harm host plant roots, but broadleaf herbicides such as glyphosate can be useful when care is taken not to spray host plant leaves. Multiple applications are necessary to eventually move herbicide to the root and block production of new shoots. The dispersed seeds are viable for many years, so manually removing B. alba before seed production is important.
