= Mansoa =

Mansoa may refer to:

- Mansôa, a town in Guinea-Bissau
  - Mansoa River
- Mansoa (plant), a genus of plants in the family Bignoniaceae
