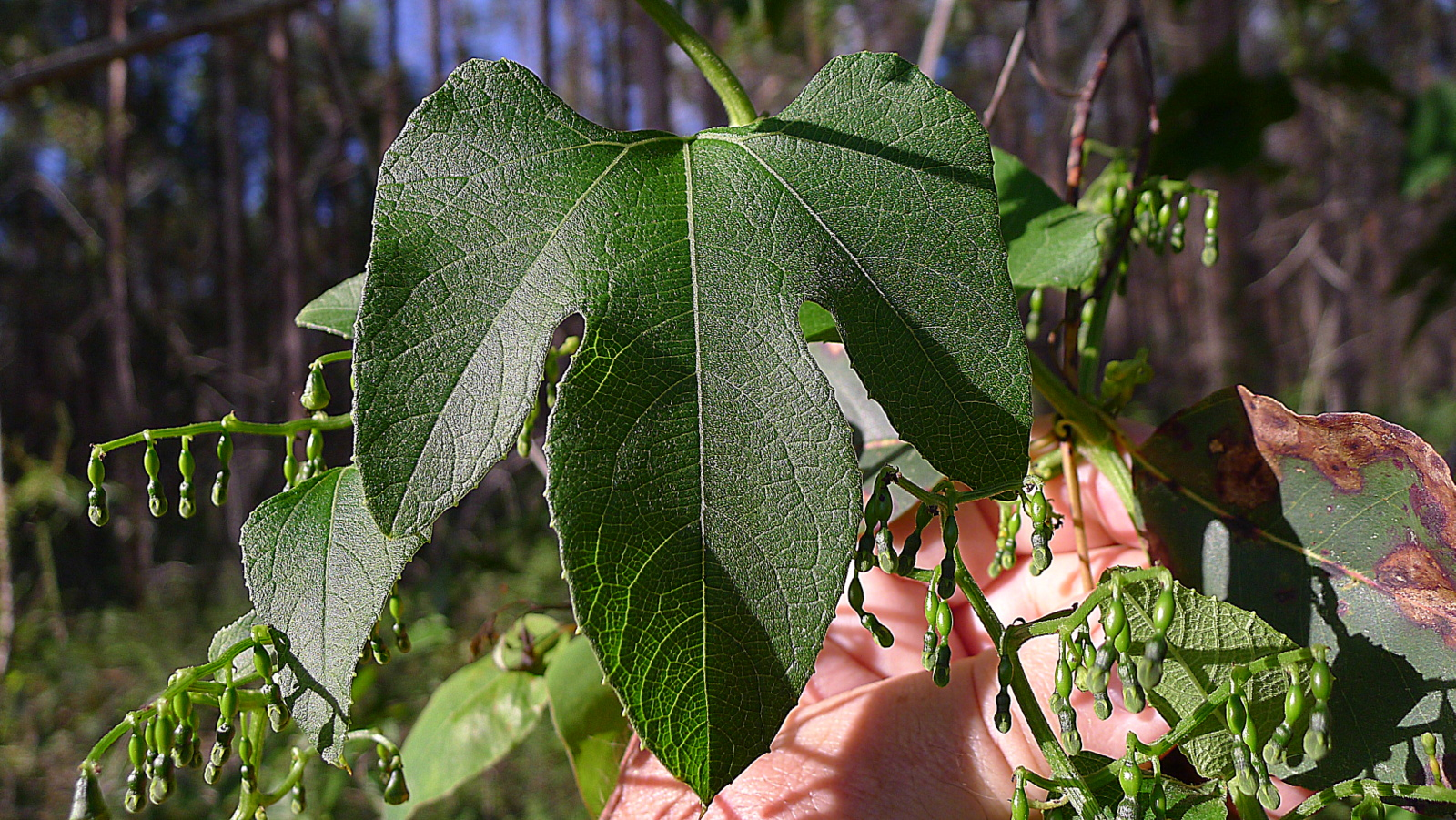
- Cayaponia tayuya leaf

Scientific classification
- Kingdom: Plantae
- Clade: Tracheophytes
- Clade: Angiosperms
- Clade: Eudicots
- Clade: Rosids
- Order: Cucurbitales
- Family: Cucurbitaceae
- Genus: Cayaponia
- Species: C. tayuya

Binomial name
- Cayaponia tayuya (Vell.) Cogn.

Synonyms
- Cayaponia piauhiensis; Cayaponia ficifolia; Bryonia tayuya; Trianosperma tayuya; Trianosperma piauhiensis; Trianosperma ficcifolia

= Cayaponia tayuya =

Tayuya

Species of plant

Cayaponia tayuya (tayuya or taiuiá) is a vine that grows in the Amazon region of South America, in the nations of Brazil, Bolivia and Peru. Its roots are used in herbal medicine.

Studies in rodent models have shown that several cucurbitacins isolated from tayuya may have anti-inflammatory properties and reduce damage from arthritis. Some cucurbitacins can be made anti-rheumatic agent.
