= Vera Lúcia Gomes-Klein =

Brazilian botanist

Dr. Vera Lúcia Gomes-Klein is a Brazilian botanist and professor at the Federal University of Goiás. She specializes in plant taxonomy, particularly floristics and the classification of spermatophytes.

== Career ==
She is manager of the Federal University of Goiás' Conservation Unit, which consists of an herbarium, the August Forest of Saint Hilaire, and the Serra Dourada Biological Reserve. She has described at least five species of melonleaf in the genus Cayaponia. The standard author abbreviation Gomes-Klein is used to indicate this person as the author when citing a botanical name.
