= Cayaponia racemosa =

Conservation status
- Least Concern (IUCN 3.1)

Scientific classification
- Kingdom: Plantae
- Clade: Tracheophytes
- Clade: Angiosperms
- Clade: Eudicots
- Clade: Rosids
- Order: Cucurbitales
- Family: Cucurbitaceae
- Genus: Cayaponia
- Species: C. racemosa

Binomial name
- Cayaponia racemosa (Mill.) Cogn.

Synonyms
- Arkezostis latebrosa (Aiton) Kuntze; Arkezostis racemosa (Mill.) Kuntze; Bryonia latebrosa Aiton; Bryonia racemosa Mill.; Cayaponia latebrosa (Aiton) Cogn.; Cayaponia racemosa var. acutiloba Cogn.; Cayaponia racemosa var. laevis Cogn.; Cayaponia racemosa var. microcarpa Cogn.; Cayaponia racemosa var. palmatipartita Cogn.; Cayaponia racemosa var. plumieri Cogn.; Cayaponia racemosa var. scaberrima Cogn.; Cayaponia racemosa var. subintegrifolia Cogn.; Cionandra cuspidata Griseb.; Cionandra graciliflora Griseb.; Cionandra racemosa (Mill.) Griseb.; Trianosperma racemosum (Mill.) Griseb.

Species of plant

Cayaponia racemosa, the mountain melonleaf or Mountain bryony, is a perennial vine in the family Cucurbitaceae. it is native to Mexico, Central America, the Caribbean, and northern South America.
