= Mansoa difficilis =

Scientific classification
- Kingdom: Plantae
- Clade: Tracheophytes
- Clade: Angiosperms
- Clade: Eudicots
- Clade: Asterids
- Order: Lamiales
- Family: Bignoniaceae
- Genus: Mansoa
- Species: M. difficilis

Binomial name
- Mansoa difficilis Bureau & K.Schum.

Species of vine

Mansoa difficilis is a species of neotropical liana in the family Bignoniaceae. It is native to Brazil, Argentina, and Paraguay. Its flowers range in colour from fuchsia to purple.
