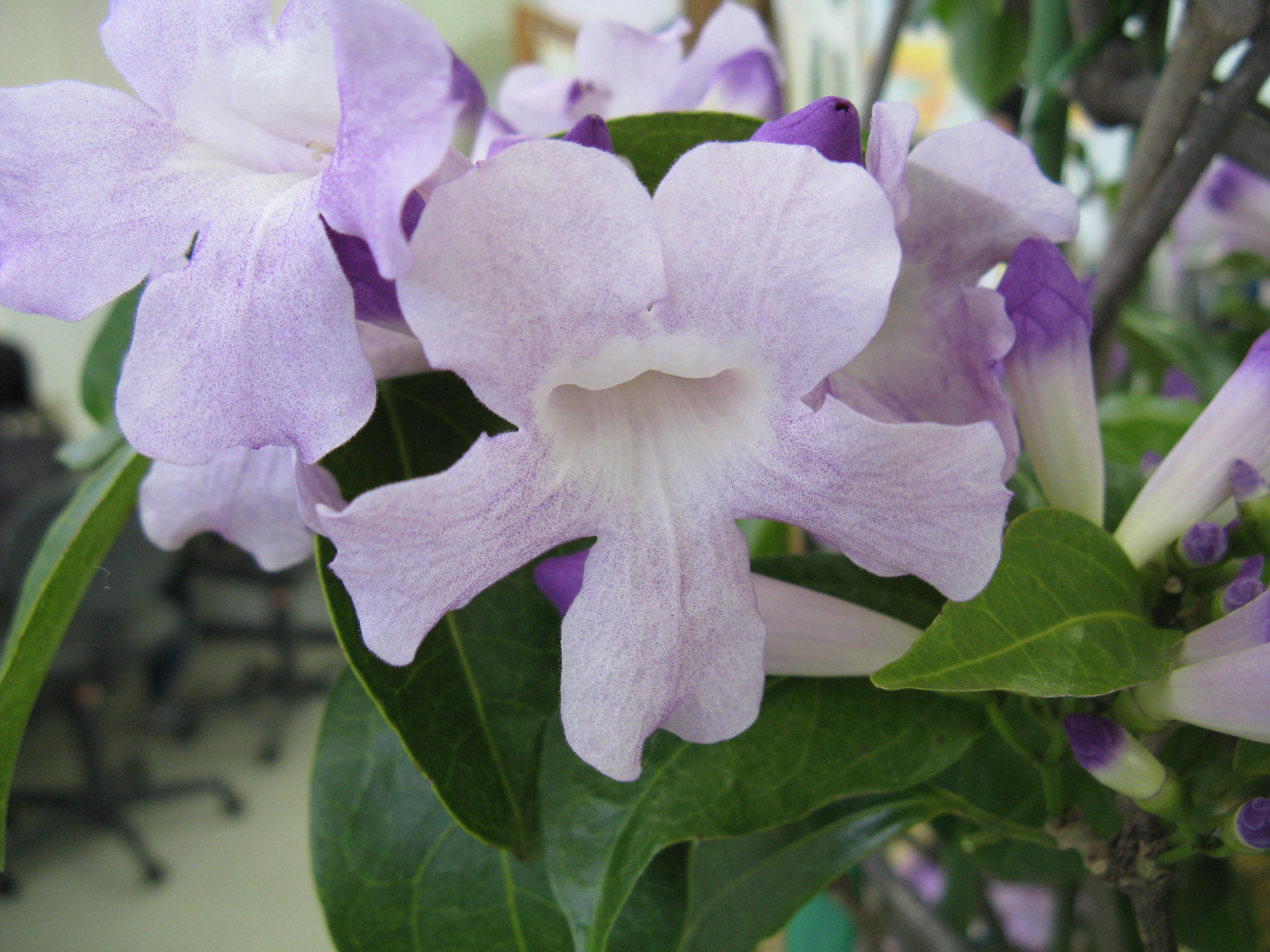
- Garlic vine in bloom

Scientific classification
- Kingdom: Plantae
- Clade: Tracheophytes
- Clade: Angiosperms
- Clade: Eudicots
- Clade: Asterids
- Order: Lamiales
- Family: Bignoniaceae
- Genus: Mansoa
- Species: M. alliacea

Binomial name
- Mansoa alliacea (Lam.) A.H.Gentry

Synonyms
- Adenocalymma alliaceum (Miers); Adenocalymma pachypus; Adenocalymma sagotii (Bureau & K. Schum); Bignonia alliacea (basionym); Cystida aequinoctialis; Pachyptera alliacea; Pseudocalymma alliaceum (Sandwith); Pseudocalymma pachypus; Pseudocalymma sagotti (Bureau & K. Schum)

= Mansoa alliacea =

Species of plant

Mansoa alliacea, or garlic vine, is a species of tropical liana in the family Bignoniaceae. It is native to Northern South America, and has spread to Central America and Brazil.

== Description ==
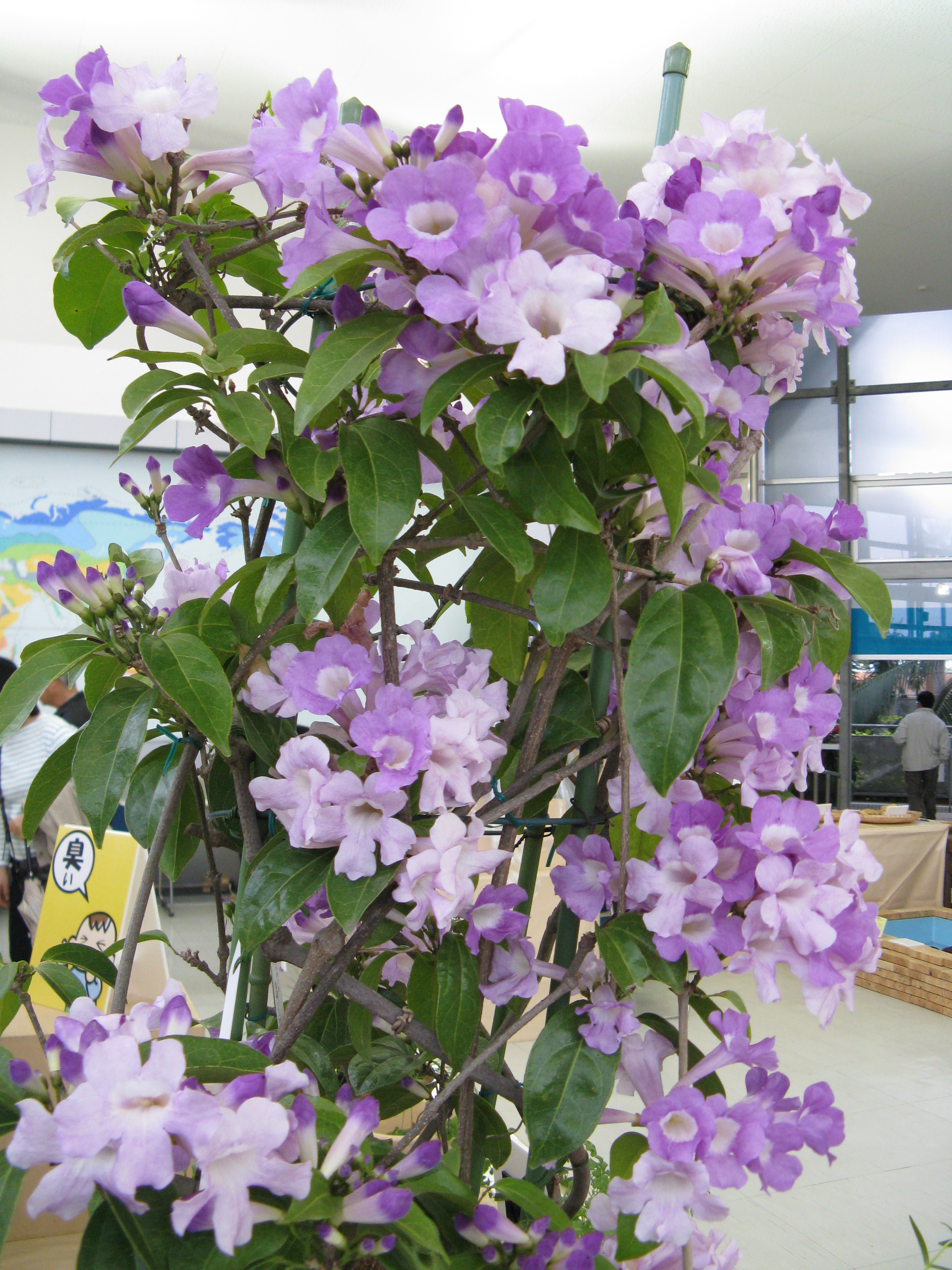
A cultivated garlic vine at the Sakuya Konohana Kan, a botanical garden in Osaka, Japan.

The plant can be described as a shrub or a liana since it produces numerous woody shoots from the root and reaches a height of 2 to 3 m. The stems are almost bare and slightly scaly.

The short-stalked leaves are opposite and trifoliate. The petiole is up to 3 centimeters long. The slightly leathery, short-stalked, egg-shaped to elliptical leaflets are almost glabrous, slightly scaly, entire and rounded, pointed to pointed with a pointed, rarely rounded to truncated base.

The middle leaflet is often replaced by a long, usually three-part, often falling tendril. The slightly glandular leaflets are 10 to 27 centimeters long. The leaflet stalks are up to 3 centimeters long. The pseudo stipules are inconspicuous.

=== Inflorescence ===
Axillary, few-flowered and thyroid-shaped inflorescences are formed. The large, slightly fragrant, hermaphrodite and stalked, funnel-shaped flowers with double perianth are violet to purple-white. The small, about 1 centimeter long, cup-shaped and slightly glandular calyx is slightly toothed, almost truncated. The corolla is up to 9 centimeters long and the bare corolla tube up to 7 centimeters. The corolla lobes are up to 2 centimeters long. The 4 enclosed stamens are didynamic. The two-chambered and scaly, elongated ovary is superior, the style with two-lobed stigma is enclosed. There is a discus. The plant flowers abundantly twice a year, in autumn to winter and in spring (though it may also have some flowers sporadically throughout the year).

The fruit is ribbed, angular, pointed, almost bare, multi-seeded capsules with a persistent calyx, up to 40 centimeters long and up to 3.5 centimeters wide. The seeds are winged on both sides and are up to 5-6 centimeters long with the wings; the wings can also be reduced.

== Distribution ==
It is native to tropical South America, where it can be found growing wild in the tropical rainforests of Brazil (including the Amazon forest), Ecuador, Peru, Colombia, Venezuela, the Guianas, and also in Costa Rica.

== Cultivation ==
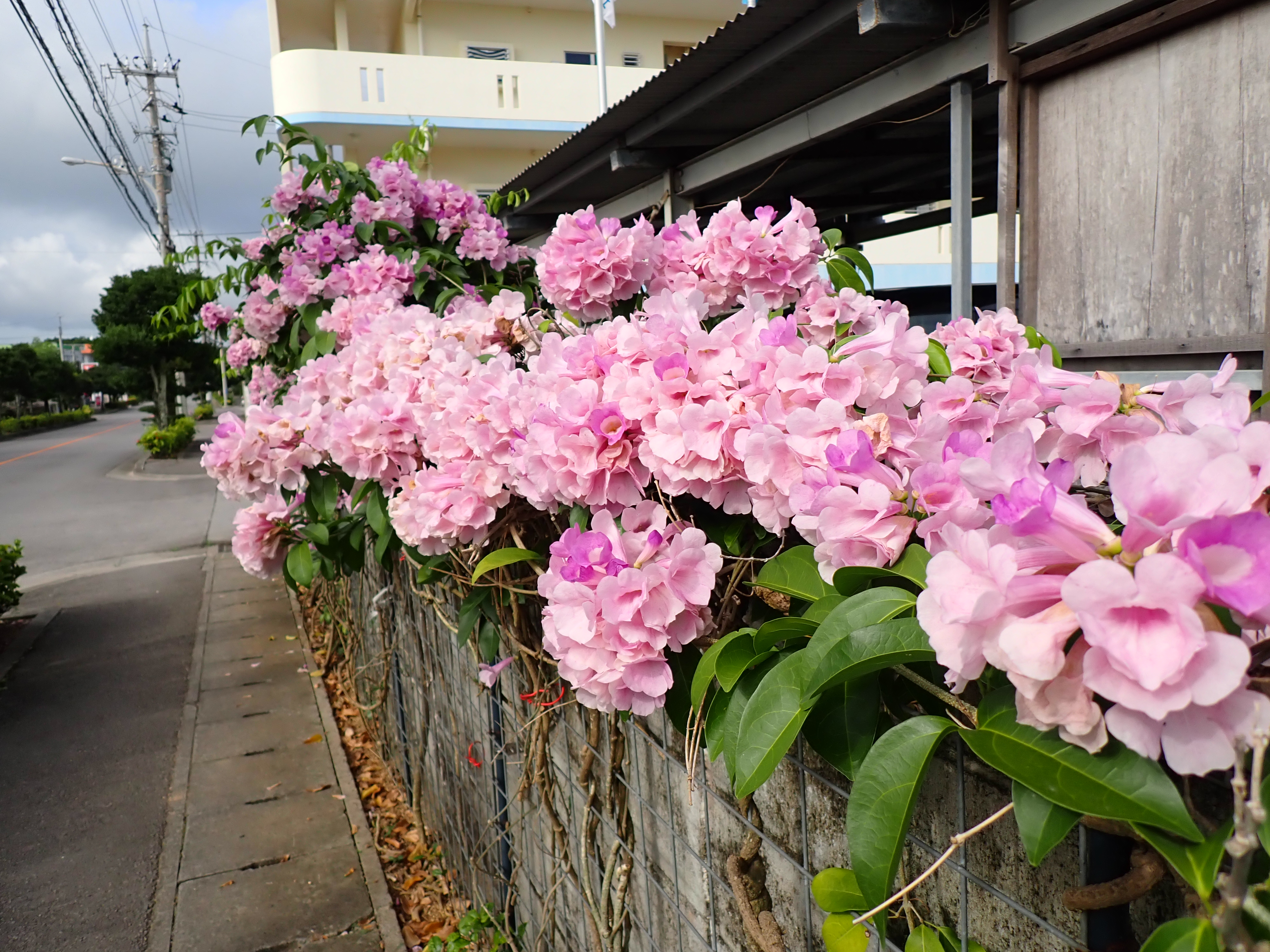
Growing on fence in Ishigaki, Okinawa

Mansoa alliacea has been exported overseas, and grows in the favourable climates of (for example) Puerto Rico, Southern Africa, Thailand and India. It is cultivated in the West Indies. Among the mestizos of the Amazon rainforest it is known as ajo sacha, a Spanish-Quechua name that means "forest garlic" or "wild garlic".

=== Uses ===
It is a plant remedy in the Amazon for pain and inflammation from arthritis and rheumatism, as well as colds, flu, fever, diarrhea and skin ulcers. The bark is used in ayahuasca preparations. Some capsule and leaf products are sold in stores in Brazil and Peru, and can be found as an ingredient in several other multi-herb formulas for cold, flu, and pain.

== Gallery ==
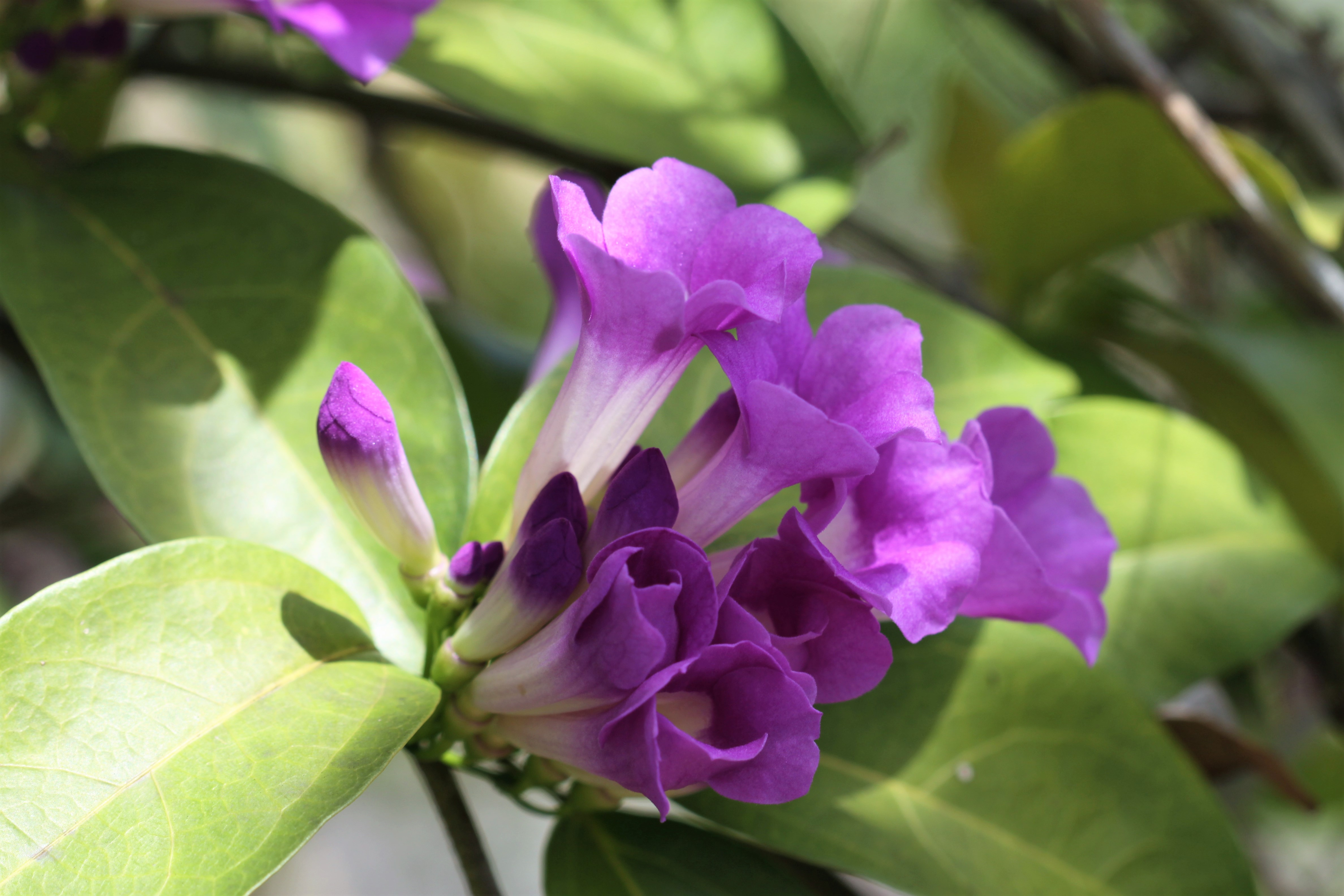
M. alliacea flowers in Thailand

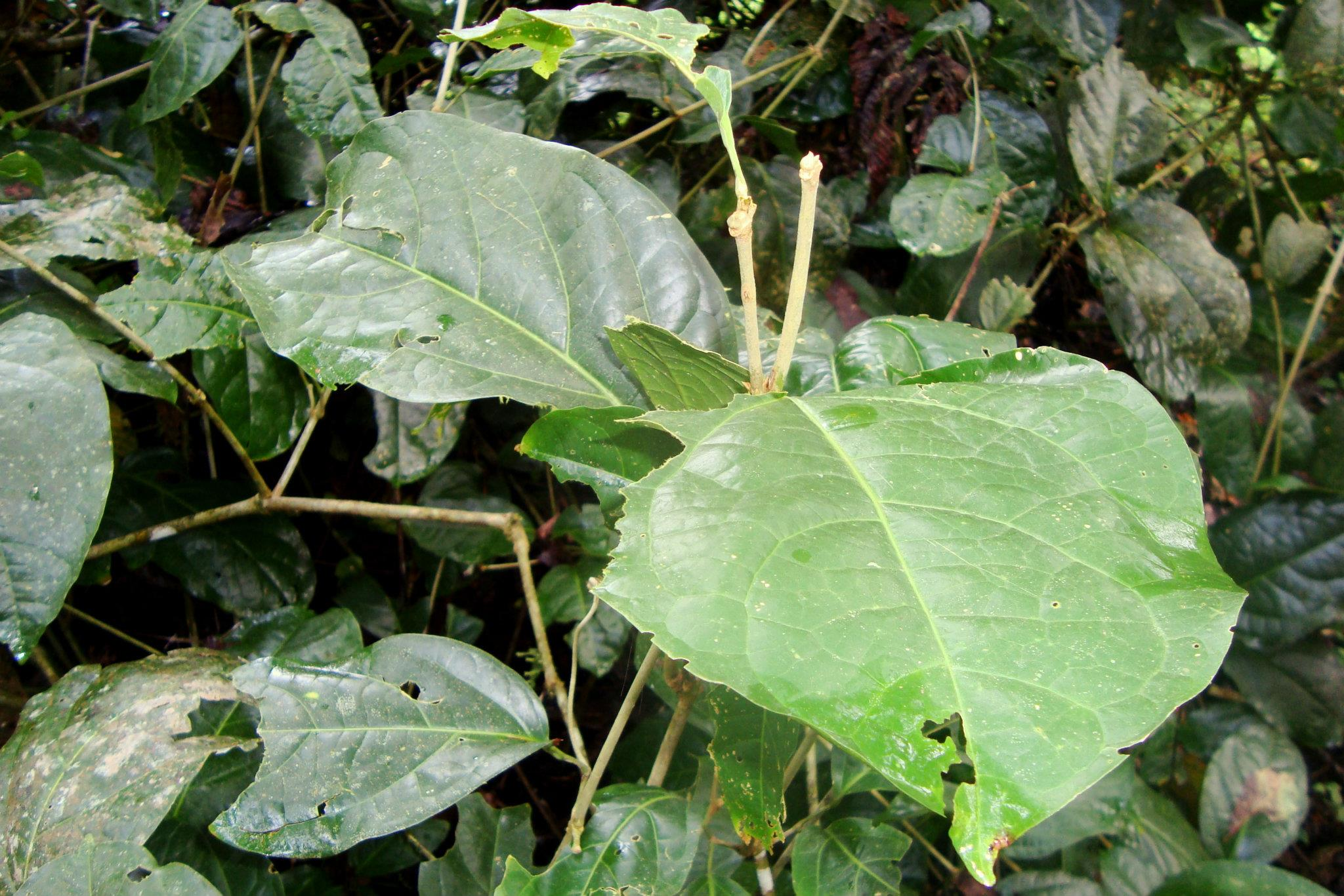
M. alliacea leaves

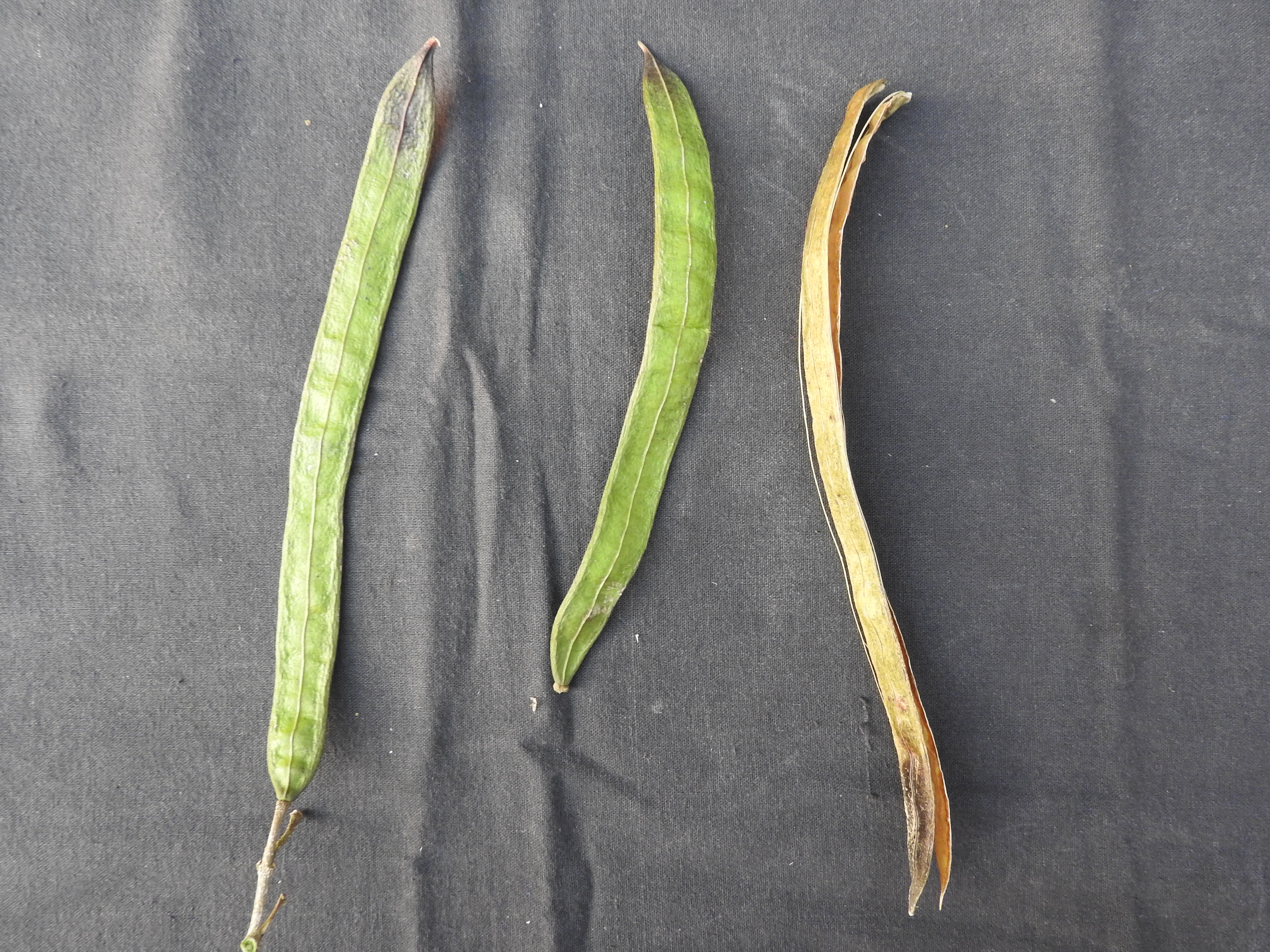
M. alliacea fruit

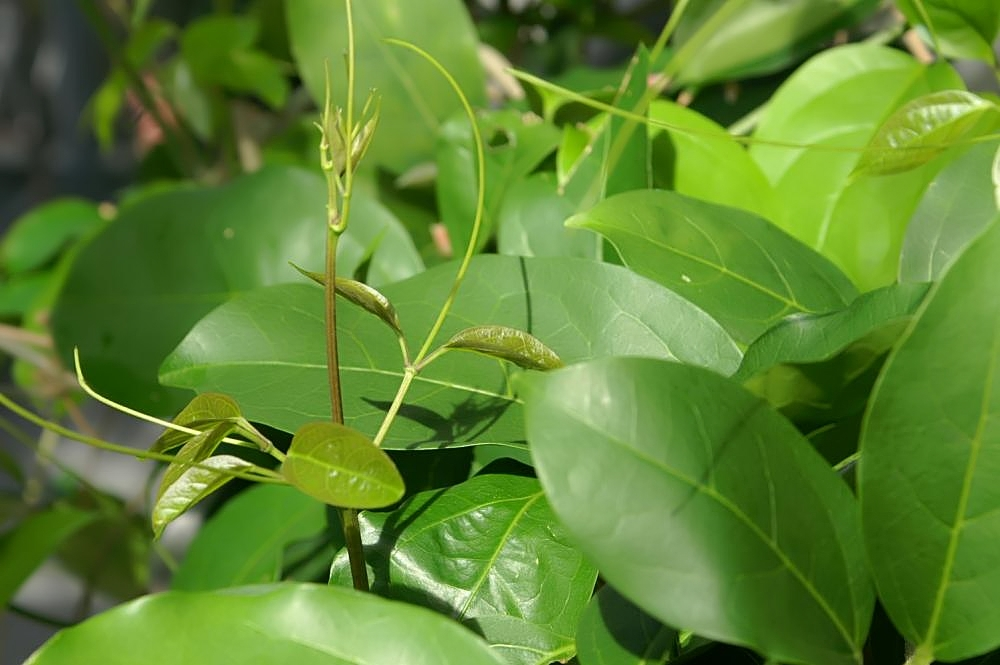
Tendrils

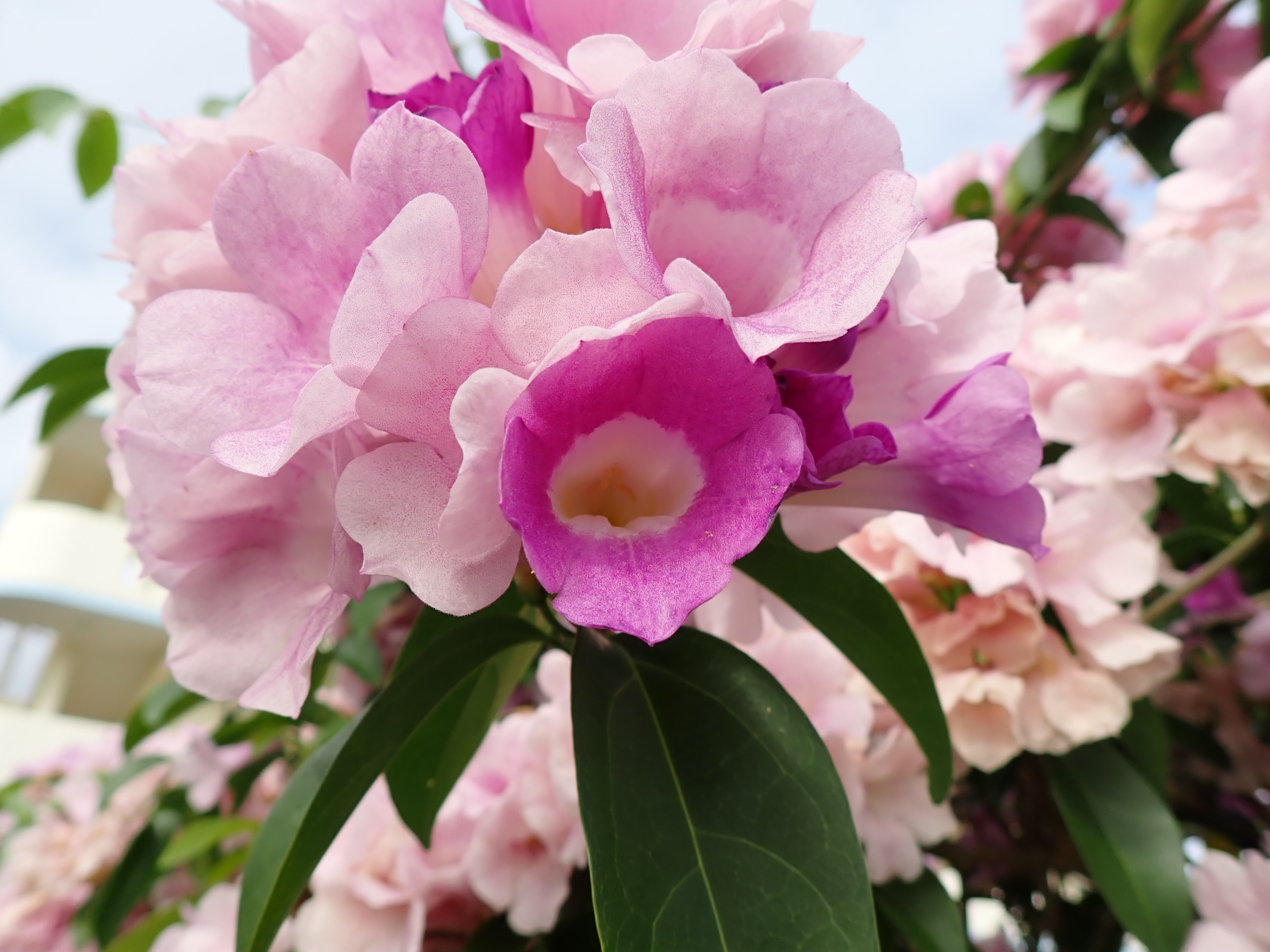
Flower closeup

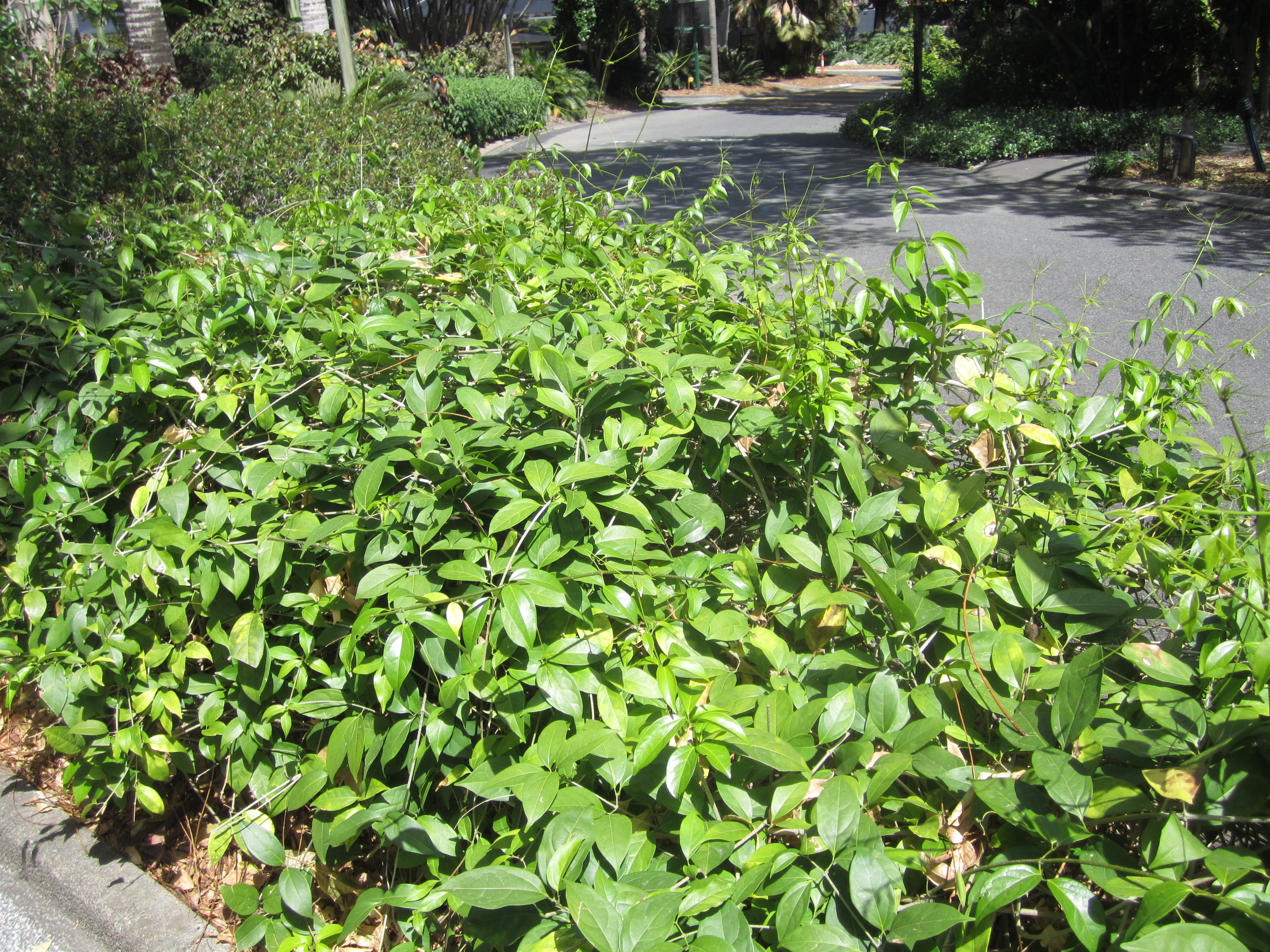
Groundcover

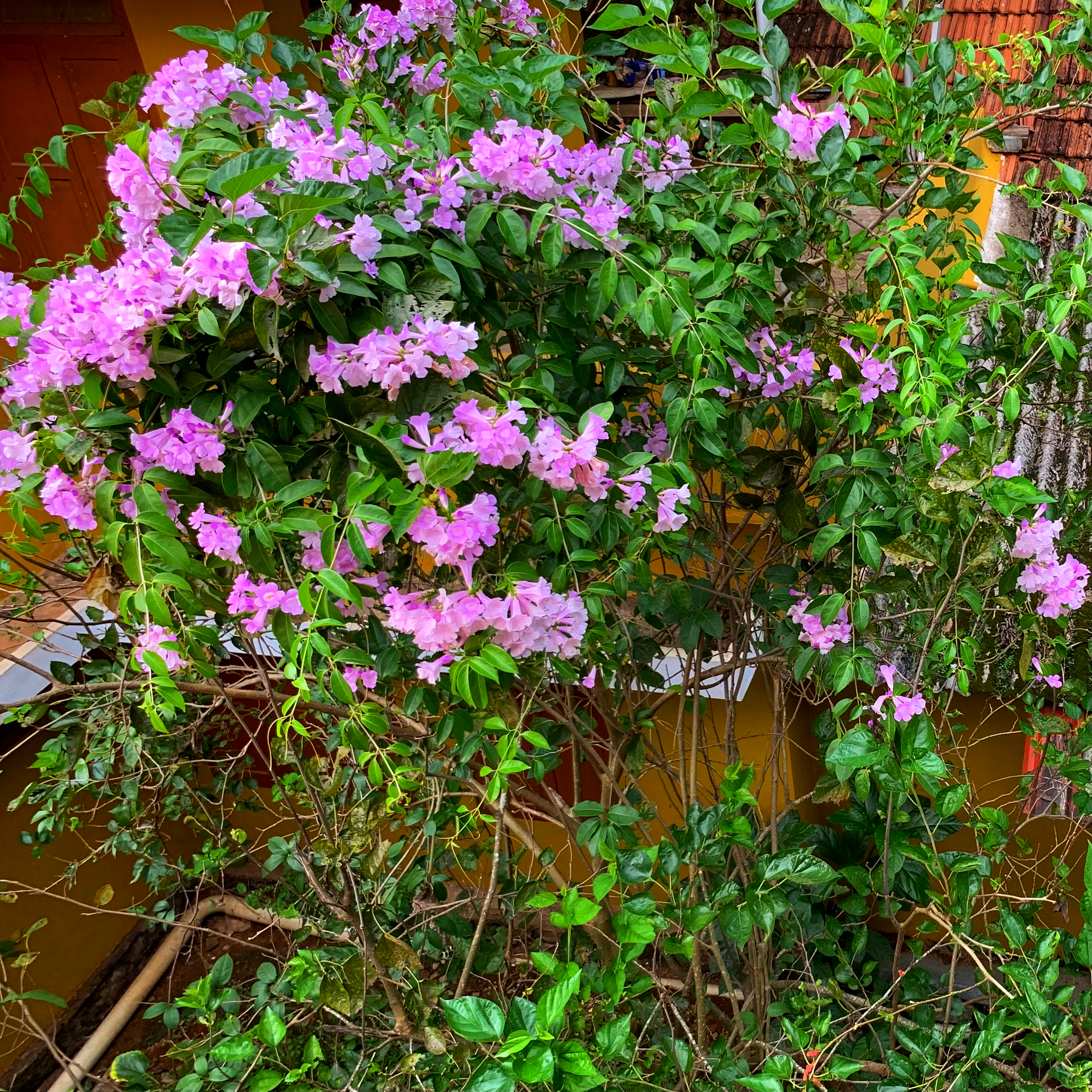
Shrubby growth

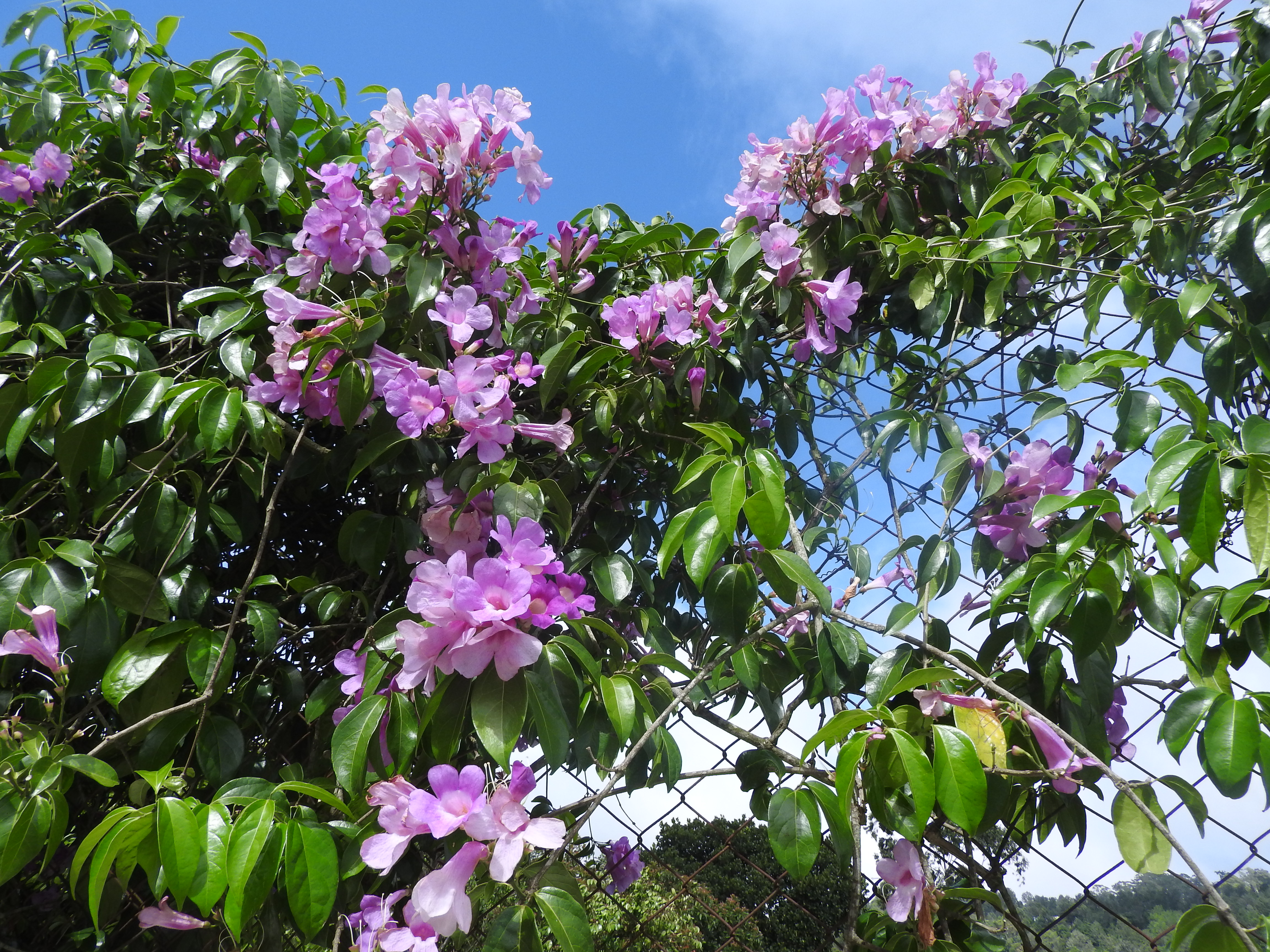
Climbing on barbed wire fence, Salem, India
