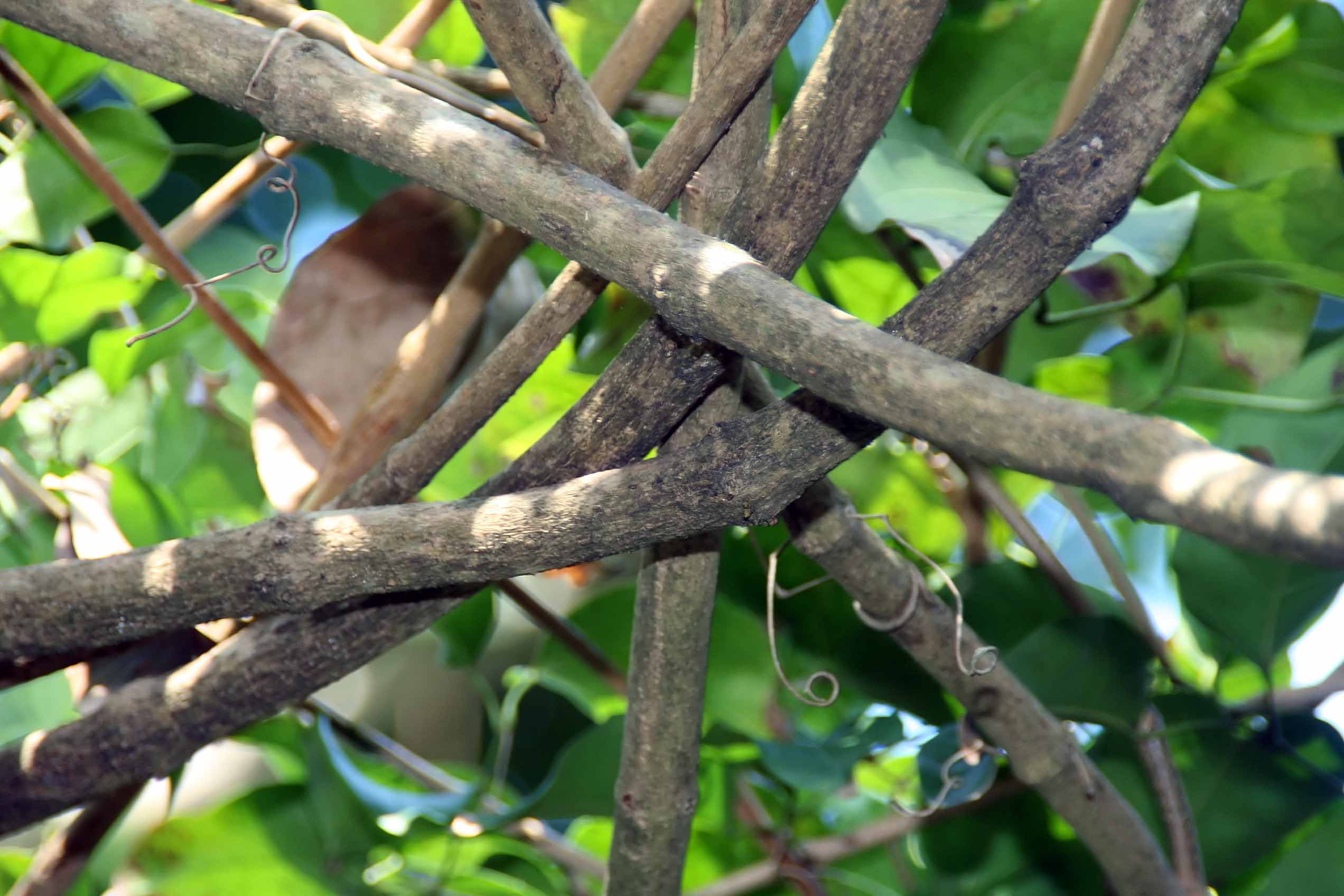

Scientific classification
- Kingdom: Plantae
- Clade: Tracheophytes
- Clade: Angiosperms
- Clade: Eudicots
- Clade: Asterids
- Order: Lamiales
- Family: Bignoniaceae
- Genus: Mansoa
- Species: M. verrucifera

Binomial name
- Mansoa verrucifera Gentry.

Synonyms
- Adenocalymma helicocalyx Kuntze; Onohualcoa verrucifera (Schltr.) A. H. Gentry

= Mansoa verrucifera =

Species of vine

Mansoa verrucifera is a species of liana in the family Bignoniaceae. It is native to Mexico, Guyana, and Venezuela. M. verrucifera bears long, narrow fruit, and has trifoliolate leaves that grow oppositely.
