= Antônio Luiz Patrício da Silva Manso =

Brazilian botanist (1788–1848)

António Luiz Patrício da Silva Manso (1788–1848) was a Brazilian botanist, medical doctor, and politician.

Born in Campinas, Brazil, Silva Manso became an expert on spermatophytes and was the first person to classify the genus Cayaponia and the species Cayaponia espelina. He named the genus Cayaponia after the indigenous Cayapo people of Brazil. A genus of climbing shrubs, Mansoa, is named after him. He began work as a painter, as his father was a painter. He began studying botany in 1819 and became a licensed physician in 1820. He was also a member of the Brazilian General Assembly from 1834 to 1837.

He became involved in the Brazilian struggle for independence, which led to his murder in January 1848.
