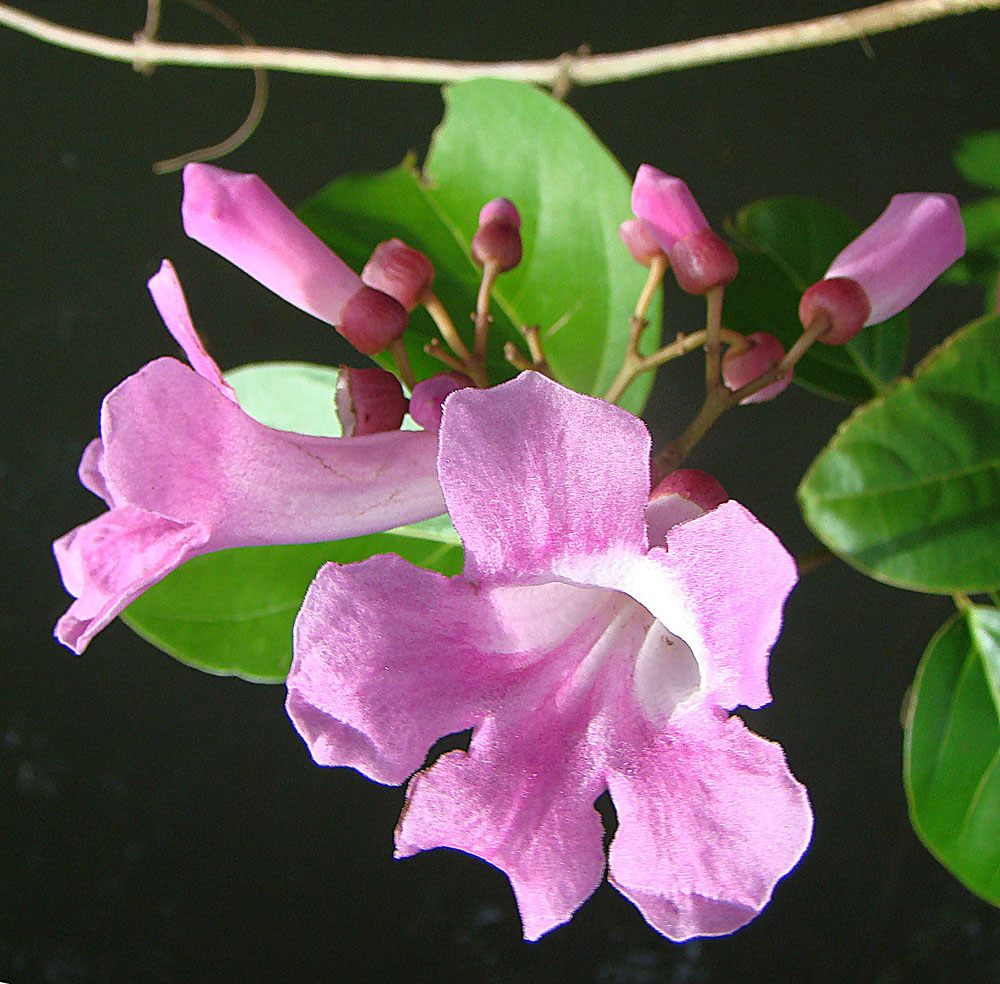
- Mansoa hymenaea, in Nicaragua

Scientific classification
- Kingdom: Plantae
- Clade: Tracheophytes
- Clade: Angiosperms
- Clade: Eudicots
- Clade: Asterids
- Order: Lamiales
- Family: Bignoniaceae
- Genus: Mansoa
- Species: M. hymenae

Binomial name
- Mansoa hymenae Gentry.

= Mansoa hymenaea =

Species of vine

Mansoa hymenaea is a species of liana in the family Bignoniaceae. It is native to Mexico through South America.
