= Selysia =

Scientific classification
- Kingdom: Plantae
- Clade: Tracheophytes
- Clade: Angiosperms
- Clade: Eudicots
- Clade: Rosids
- Order: Cucurbitales
- Family: Cucurbitaceae
- Subfamily: Cucurbitoideae
- Tribe: Cucurbiteae
- Genus: Selysia; Cogn. (1881)

Species
- Four; see text

Genus of plants

Selysia is a genus of the gourd family. It includes four species of climbers native to southern Central America and northern South America, ranging from Nicaragua to Peru and northern Brazil.

Plants of the World Online accepts the genus. A 2011 study based on genetics placed it under the genus Cayaponia.

== Species ==
Four species are accepted.

- Selysia bidentata Hampshire – native to Panama and northwestern Colombia
- Selysia cordata Cogn. – Colombia
- Selysia prunifera (Poepp. & Endl.) Cogn. – Nicaragua to Peru and northern Brazil
- Selysia smithii (Standl.) C. Jeffrey – western Colombia, Ecuador, and Peru
