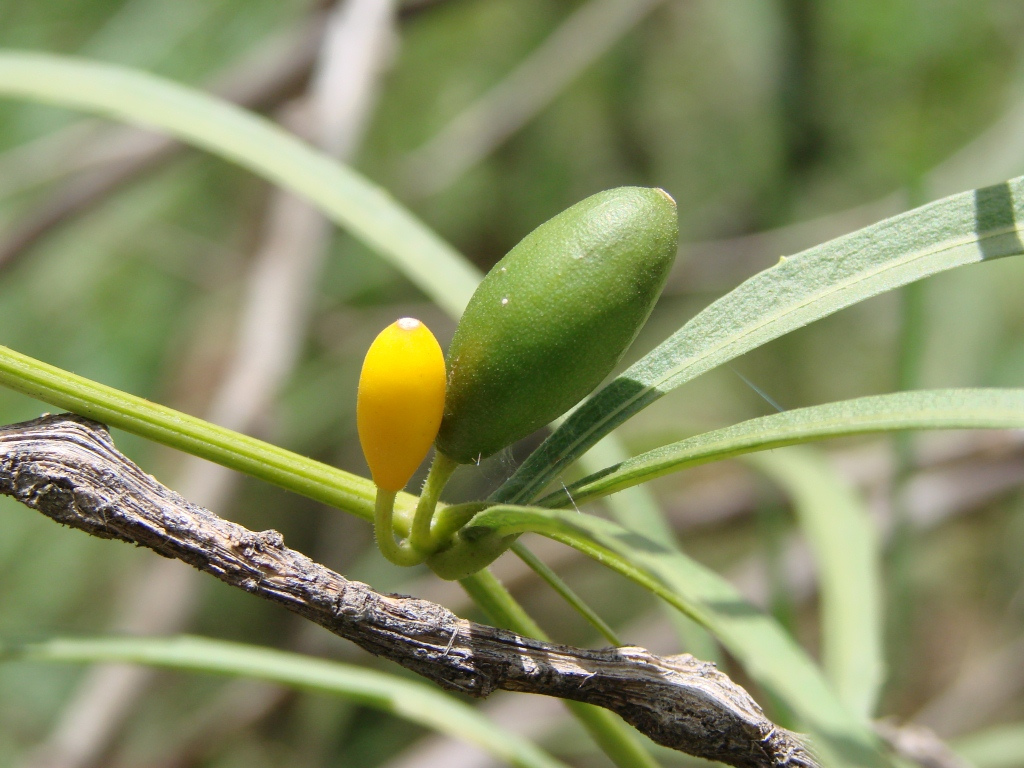
- Cayaponia espelina plant with fruit

Scientific classification
- Kingdom: Plantae
- Clade: Tracheophytes
- Clade: Angiosperms
- Clade: Eudicots
- Clade: Rosids
- Order: Cucurbitales
- Family: Cucurbitaceae
- Genus: Cayaponia
- Species: C. espelina

Binomial name
- Cayaponia espelina (Silva Manso) Cogn.

Synonyms
- Perianthopodus espelina Silva Manso

= Cayaponia espelina =

Cayaponia espelina fruit.jpg

Species of flowering plant

Cayaponia espelina, also known as the São Caetano melon, is a plant native to Brazil. It is a diuretic and aids in the treatment of diarrhea and syphilis. The fruits are occasionally eaten by the maned wolf (Chrysocyon brachyurus).
