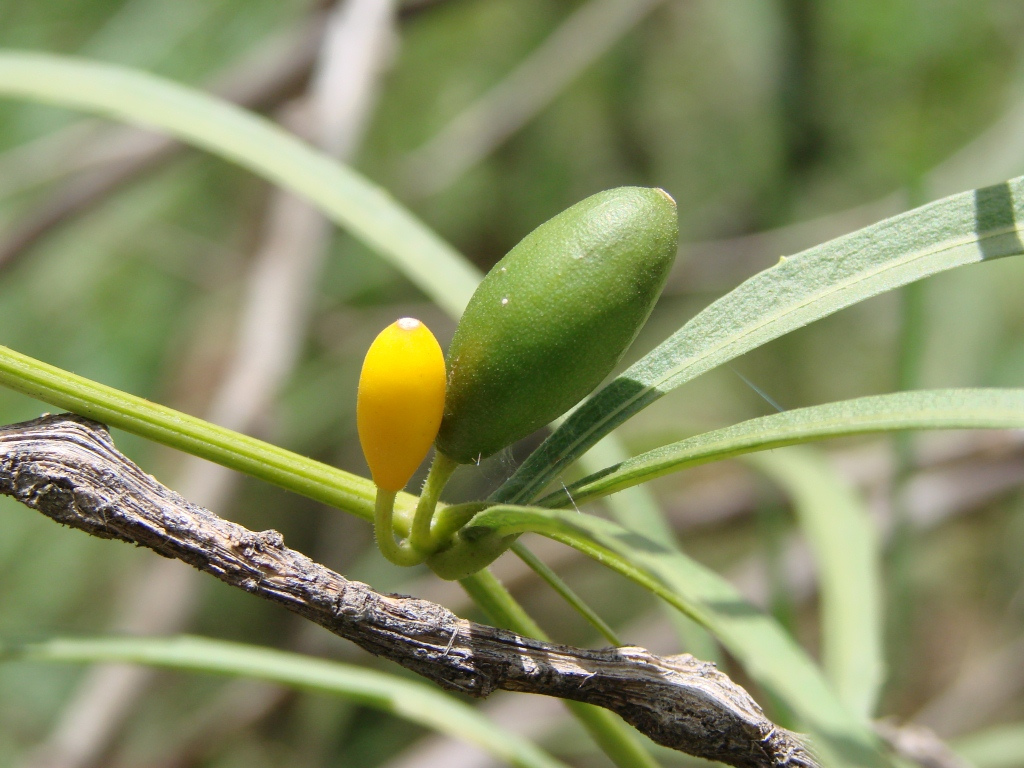
- Cayaponia espelina fruit
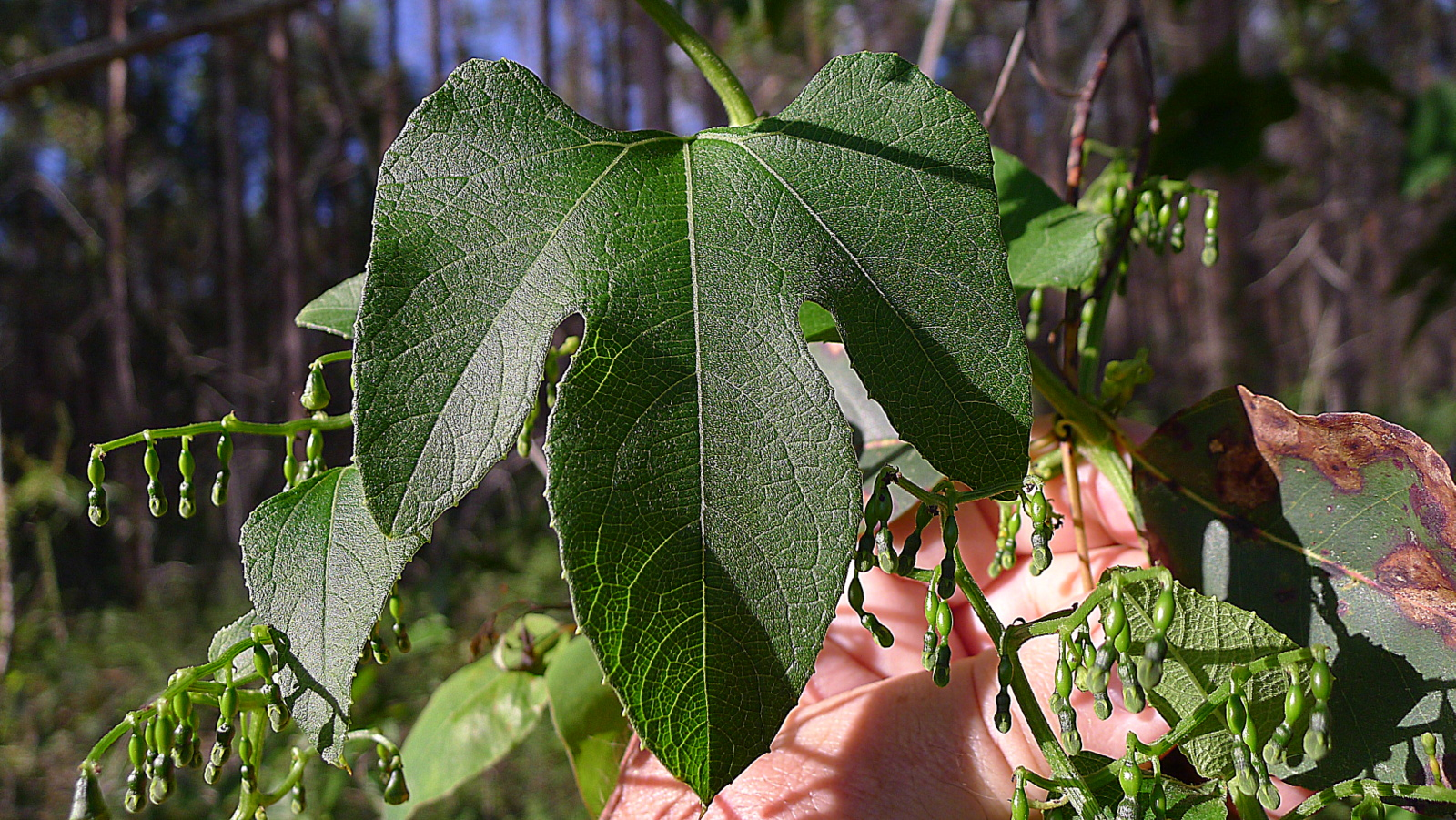
- Cayaponia tayuya leaf

Scientific classification
- Kingdom: Plantae
- Clade: Embryophytes
- Clade: Tracheophytes
- Clade: Angiosperms
- Clade: Eudicots
- Clade: Rosids
- Order: Cucurbitales
- Family: Cucurbitaceae
- Subfamily: Cucurbitoideae
- Tribe: Cucurbiteae
- Genus: Cayaponia; Silva Manso

Species
- 74; see text

Synonyms
- Allagosperma M.Roem. (1846); Alternasemina Silva Manso (1836); Antagonia Griseb. (1874); Arkezostis Raf. (1838); Bryonopsis Arn. (1841); Cionandra Griseb. (1860); Dermophylla Silva Manso (1836), nom. illeg.; Druparia Silva Manso (1836), nom. illeg.; Perianthopodus Silva Manso (1836); Trianosperma Mart. (1843)

= Cayaponia =

Genus of flowering plants

Cayaponia is among the largest genera in the gourd family, Cucurbitaceae, with 74 species. The plants are referred to as melonleaf. They are common from the southern United States to South America. Some species are also found in western Africa, Madagascar, and Fernando de Noronha, which is about 354 km (220 mi) off the coast of Brazil.

Most species are found in rainforests and have white or yellow-green flowers. The ancestral mode of pollination in Cayaponia was inferred as pollinated by bats, but at least two shifts to bee pollination are inferred among some of its species. This is apparently the first clade to shift from bat to bee pollination vice bee to bat pollination. A 2011 phylogenetioc study placed the genus Selysia under this genus.

Brazilian botanist António Luiz Patricio da Silva Manso named this genus after the indigenous Cayapo people of Brazil.

== Species ==
74 species are accepted.

- Cayaponia africana (Hook.f.) Exell
- Cayaponia alarici M. Porto
- Cayaponia amazonica (Poepp. & Endl.) Cogn.
- Cayaponia americana (Lam.) Cogn.
- Cayaponia angustiloba (Cogn.) Cogn.
- Cayaponia attenuata (Hook. & Arn.) Cogn.
- Cayaponia biflora Cogn. ex Harms
- Cayaponia boliviensis Cogn.
- Cayaponia bonariensis (Mill.) Mart.
- Cayaponia bonplandii (Cogn.) Cogn.
- Cayaponia botryocarpa C. Jeffrey
- Cayaponia breviloba (Griseb. ex Cogn.) Pozner
- Cayaponia buraeavii Cogn.
- Cayaponia cabocla (Vell.) Mart.
- Cayaponia capitata Cogn. ex Harms
- Cayaponia caulobotrys C.Jeffrey
- Cayaponia citrullifolia (Griseb.) Cogn. ex Griseb.
- Cayaponia cogniauxiana Gomes-Klein
- Cayaponia coriacea Cogn.
- Cayaponia cruegeri (Naudin) Cogn.
- Cayaponia denticulata Killip ex C.Jeffrey
- Cayaponia diversifolia Cogn.
- Cayaponia domingensis (Cogn.) H.Schaef. & M.Nee
- Cayaponia duckei Harms
- Cayaponia espelina (Silva Manso) Cogn.
- Cayaponia ferruginea Gomes-Klein
- Cayaponia floribunda (Cogn.) Cogn.
- Cayaponia fluminensis (Vell.) Cogn.
- Cayaponia glandulosa (Mart.) Cogn.
- Cayaponia gracillima (Cogn.) Cogn.
- Cayaponia granatensis Cogn.
- Cayaponia guianensis C.Jeffrey
- Cayaponia hammelii Grayum
- Cayaponia jenmanii C.Jeffrey
- Cayaponia kathematophora R.E.Schult.
- Cayaponia laciniosa (L.) C.Jeffrey
- Cayaponia laxa Cogn. ex Harms
- Cayaponia lhotskyana (Cogn.) Cogn.
- Cayaponia longifolia Cogn.
- Cayaponia longiloba A.K.Monro
- Cayaponia macrocalyx Harms
- Cayaponia martiana (Cogn.) Cogn.
- Cayaponia membranacea Gomes-Klein
- Cayaponia nitida Gomes-Klein & Pirani
- Cayaponia noronhae C.Jeffrey
- Cayaponia ophthalmica R.E.Schult.
- Cayaponia oppositifolia Harms
- Cayaponia ovata Cogn.
- Cayaponia palmata Cogn.
- Cayaponia pedata Cogn.
- Cayaponia peruviana (Poepp. & Endl.) Cogn.
- Cayaponia petiolulata Cogn.
- Cayaponia pilosa (Vell.) Cogn.
- Cayaponia podantha Cogn.
- Cayaponia quinqueloba (Raf.) Shinners
- Cayaponia racemosa (Mill.) Cogn.
- Cayaponia rigida (Cogn.) Cogn.
- Cayaponia rugosa Gomes-Klein & Pirani
- Cayaponia ruizii Cogn.
- Cayaponia selysioides C.Jeffrey
- Cayaponia sessiliflora Wunderlin
- Cayaponia setulosa (Cogn.) Cogn.
- Cayaponia simplicifolia (Naudin) Cogn.
- Cayaponia tayuya (Vell.) Cogn.
- Cayaponia ternata (Vell.) Cogn.
- Cayaponia tessmannii Harms
- Cayaponia tibiricae (Naudin) Cogn.
- Cayaponia triangularis (Cogn.) Cogn.
- Cayaponia trifoliata (Cogn.) Cogn.
- Cayaponia trilobata Cogn.
- Cayaponia tubulosa Cogn.
- Cayaponia ulei Cogn. ex Harms
- Cayaponia villosissima Cogn.
- Cayaponia weddellii (Naudin) Cogn.
