= Selysia bidentata =

Scientific classification
- Kingdom: Plantae
- Clade: Tracheophytes
- Clade: Angiosperms
- Clade: Eudicots
- Clade: Rosids
- Order: Cucurbitales
- Family: Cucurbitaceae
- Genus: Selysia
- Species: S. bidentata

Binomial name
- Selysia bidentata R.J. Hampshire

Species of flowering plant

Selysia bidentata is a species of the genus Selysia native to Panama. It is highly similar to S. smithii. It has ovate seeds and there are 6–9 of them in each fruit. The fruits turn from green to red at maturity. The leaves have three lobes. Selysia bidentata can be distinguished from the 3 other species of Selysia by its bidentate (two teeth-like parts) seeds. Seeds of the other three species are shaped like arrowheads.
