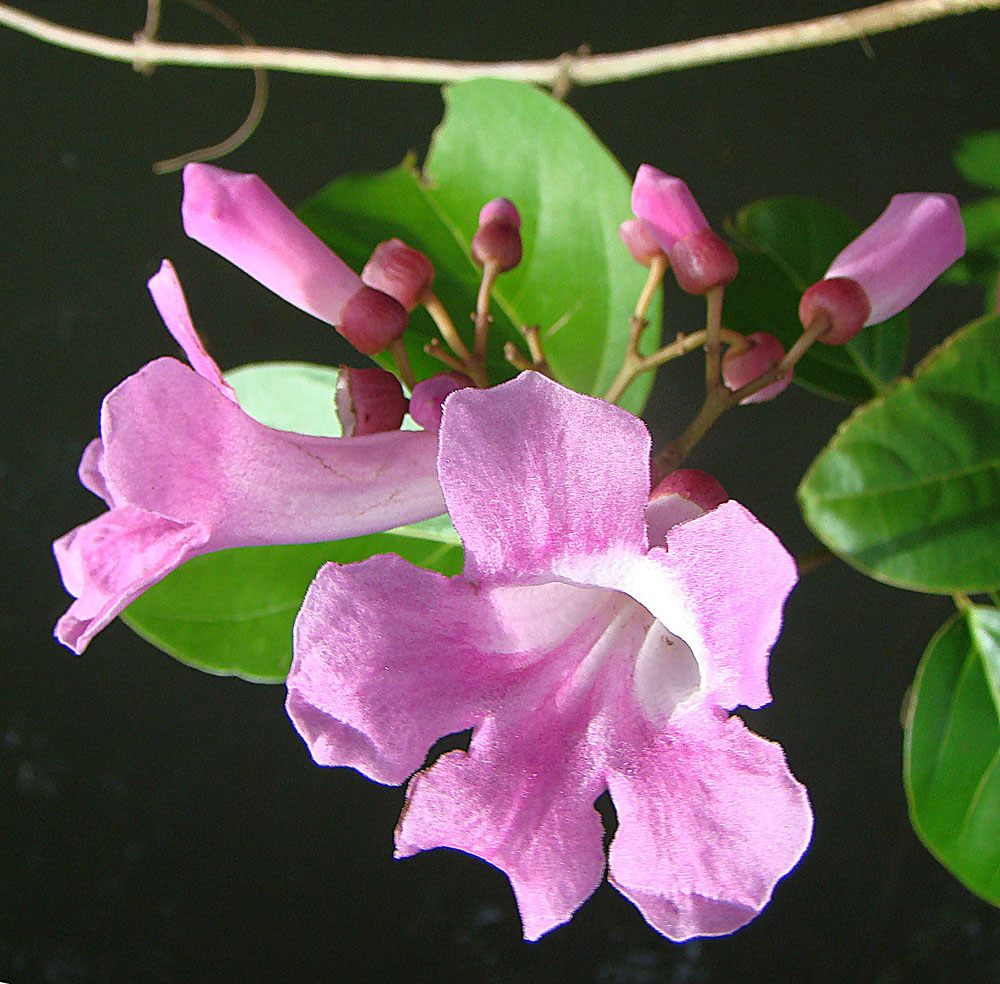
- Mansoa hymenaea, in Nicaragua

Scientific classification
- Kingdom: Plantae
- Clade: Tracheophytes
- Clade: Angiosperms
- Clade: Eudicots
- Clade: Asterids
- Order: Lamiales
- Family: Bignoniaceae
- Tribe: Bignonieae
- Genus: Mansoa; DC.

Selected species
- Mansoa alliacea; Mansoa difficilis; Mansoa hymenaea; Mansoa verrucifera

Synonyms
- Bayonia Dugand; Chodanthus Hassl; Daniella Corr. Méllo; Hanburyophyton Bureau; Onohaulcoa Lundell; Onohualcoa Lundell; Pachyptera DC. ex Meisn. Pseudocalymma A. Samp. & Kuhlm.

= Mansoa (plant) =

Genus of vines

Mansoa is a genus of tropical, flowering vines in the family Bignoniaceae.

Its native range is Mexico to Tropical America, and it is found in Argentina, Belize, Bolivia, Brazil, Colombia, Costa Rica, Ecuador, El Salvador, French Guiana, Guatemala, Guyana, Honduras, Leeward Is., Mexico, Nicaragua, Panamá, Paraguay, Peru, Suriname, Trinidad-Tobago, Venezuela and Windward Is.

The genus name of Mansoa is in honour of Antônio Luiz Patrício da Silva Manso (1788–1848), a Brazilian botanist, physician, and politician. It was first described and published in Biblioth. Universelle Genève, sér.2, Vol.17 on page 128 in 1838.

== Known species ==
According to Kew;

- Mansoa alliacea (Lam.) A.H.Gentry
- Mansoa angustidens (DC.) Bureau & K.Schum.
- Mansoa difficilis (Cham.) Bureau & K.Schum.
- Mansoa gentryi M.M.Silva
- Mansoa glaziovii Bureau & K.Schum.
- Mansoa hirsuta DC.
- Mansoa hymenaea (DC.) A.H.Gentry
- Mansoa ivanii M.M.Silva
- Mansoa lanceolata (DC.) A.H.Gentry
- Mansoa longicalyx M.M.Silva
- Mansoa minensis M.M.Silva
- Mansoa montecillensis (Ant.Molina) C.Nelson
- Mansoa onohualcoides A.H.Gentry
- Mansoa paganuccii M.M.Silva
- Mansoa parvifolia (A.H.Gentry) A.H.Gentry
- Mansoa standleyi (Steyerm.) A.H.Gentry
- Mansoa ventricosa A.H.Gentry
- Mansoa verrucifera (Schltdl.) A.H.Gentry
