= Moqua =

Moqua may refer to:

- Moqua Well, Nauru
- Moqua Caves, Nauru
- Yaren, former name of the district of Nauru
- Chi qua, also known as moa qua or moa gua (Chinese: 毛瓜; lit. 'hairy gourd'), a variety of winter melon (Benincasa hispida var. chieh-gua)
