= Paruppusilli =

Traditional Tamil dish

- Place of origin: India
- Region or state: Tamil Nadu
- Main ingredients: Toor dal, bengalgram dal, red chillies, french beans or cluster beans

Paruppusilli (Tamil: பருப்புஉசிலி) is a traditional Tamil dish. It is made by cooking toor dal and bengal gram dal with red chillies and french beans/cluster beans/plantain flowers, and is flavored with asafoetida, curry leaves and mustard seeds. It is typically served with rice and Mor Kuzhambu during a meal.

== See also ==
- Cuisine of Tamil Nadu
