= Bijwari =

Bijwari Vijwari
- Village
- Location in Rajasthan, India Bijwari (India) Bijwari (India)
- Coordinates: 27.21°N 77.49°E
- Country: India
- State: Rajasthan
- District: Bharatpur

Government
  - Body: Gram panchayat

Population (2001)
  - Total: 615

Languages
  - Official: Hindi
- Time zone: UTC+5:30 (IST)
- PIN: 321407
- ISO 3166 code: RJ-IN

Bijwari is a village in Wair tehsil of Bharatpur in Rajasthan, India. It is a village of Indolia gotra Jats. It was founded by Vijay Singh. The village is located on the banks of river Baanganga which flows across the geographical area of Rajasthan.

== Demographics ==
The village with the total population of 615 is mainly of Jat population of 315 persons comprising 43 families of Indoliya gotra of Jats, other Jat gotras include Sinsinwar with 3 families and Deshwar with 2 families. Indolia gotra is mainly dominated and had given various contribution for development of the village. The other major castes are Brahman, Mali, Jogi, Jatav. The village is blessed with recent technological developments. People are now getting acquainted with computers, mobiles and latest gadgets.

== Agriculture ==
Agriculture is the prime economic activity of Indian economy. Agriculture contributes 54% of the total workforce in India. "Bijwari" has the pride of marking itself as one of the biggest village in the Bharatpur district in terms of Agricultural land. More than 8000 Beegha area is used for various agricultural purposes. The major crops include wheat, mustard, gram, bajra, jawar, gwar. The major vegetable crops include: watermelon, melon, cucumber, tinda, pumpkin, bottle gourd, kaddu, okra, potato.

"Bijwari" is not an exception to agricultural development where almost 80% of the population depends on agriculture as a source of income. With the spread of education the people are now becoming familiar with the new agricultural techniques. Use of sprinkle pumps, tractors, fertilizers, pesticides, high yielding seeds, submersible pumps has proved to be a boon for agricultural development in the village.

== Education ==
The education programs implemented by Government of Rajasthan are given proper attention in making people aware about the benefits of education. As the result of this endeavour by government, people from "Bijwari" are now making their presence in various government and private services like Medical, Civil, Engineering, Defense fields.

== Transport ==
How to reach - The village is well connected by the Road and Railways. The village is adjacent to the NH-11(Agra-Jaipur).
