= Winter melon punch =

Sweet fruit drink

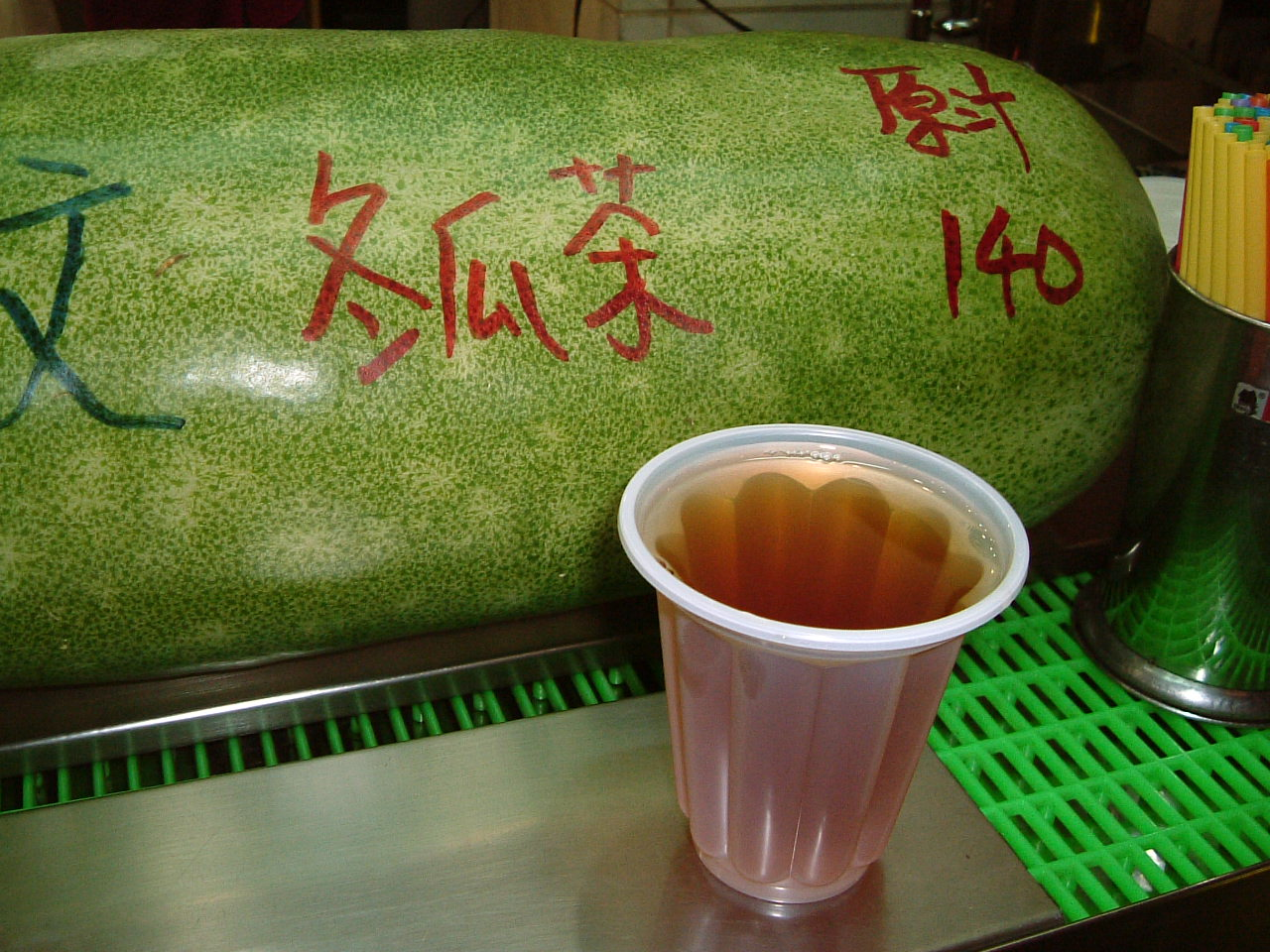
- A cup of winter melon punch in front of a winter melon at a Taiwanese street vendor's stall.
- Alternative names: Winter melon tea
- Type: sweetened fruit drink
- Place of origin: China
- Region or state: East Asia
- Serving temperature: Cold
- Main ingredients: winter melon, brown sugar or caramel
- Ingredients generally used: lime or calcium hydroxide
- Variations: addition of lemon juice, oolong tea, tapioca balls, nata de coco, or tangyuan
- Food energy (per serving): 17 kcal (71 kJ)

Winter melon punch, also called winter melon tea in East Asia (Chinese: 冬瓜茶; pinyin: dōngguā chá), is a drink made from winter melon and sugar that has been boiled for some time. It is popular in East Asia, especially Taiwan.

Winter melon punch
- Chinese: 冬瓜茶
Transcriptions
Standard Mandarin
- Hanyu Pinyin: dōngguā chá

== Preparation ==
The punch is prepared by peeling, slicing and removing the seeds of a winter melon. The winter melon slices are then placed in boiling water with brown sugar or caramel and stirred for several hours. The mixture is filtered with a gauze or sieve to remove any undissolved sediment, leaving concentrated winter melon juice that can be cooled, stored or refrigerated before drinking. It can be diluted with the aid of ice.

The concentrated winter melon juice can also be reduced to form "winter melon candy". After the reduced juice is poured into a pan and left to cool, the solid is commonly cut into cubes and sold. The winter melon candy cubes can be cooked in tea.

A sugar-free version of the winter melon punch is made for people with kidney issues and diabetes.

The winter melon slices can alternatively be soaked in lime or calcium hydroxide to preserve the melon's original flavour by hardening the flesh before boiling with sugar, caramel, and water.

== Variations ==
There are many variations of winter melon punch throughout Taiwan. Lemon juice and oolong tea can be added to winter melon punch to change its taste, or alcohol can be added to create a cocktail. Street vendors may also add tapioca balls, nata de coco, or tangyuan to winter melon punch and sell it as a dessert.

== See also ==
- List of juices
