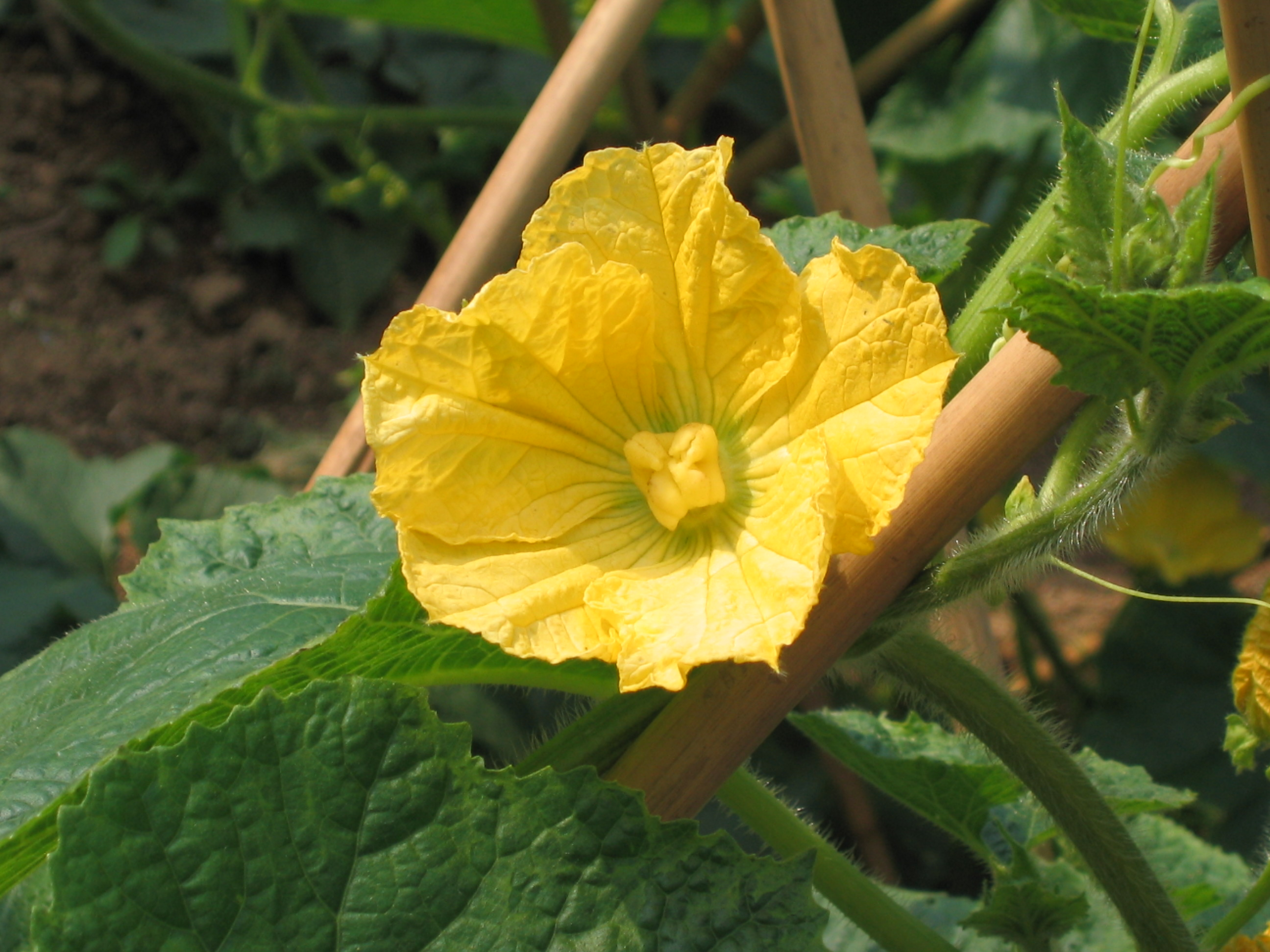
- Flower of B. hispida v. chieh-qua

Scientific classification
- Kingdom: Plantae
- Clade: Tracheophytes
- Clade: Angiosperms
- Clade: Eudicots
- Clade: Rosids
- Order: Cucurbitales
- Family: Cucurbitaceae
- Genus: Benincasa
- Species: W. gourd
- Variety: B. h. var. chieh-qua

Trinomial name
- Benincasa hispida var. chieh-qua F.C.How, 1954

= Chi qua =

Variety of edible fruit

Chi qua is the fruit of Benincasa hispida var. chieh-qua, a variety of the wax gourd. The fruit is a staple of the Chinese diet.

== Etymology ==
The fruit is commonly referred to in Chinese as chi qua (simplified Chinese: 节瓜; traditional Chinese: 節瓜; pinyin: jiéguā; Jyutping: zit3 gwaa1), but can also be referred to as moa qua or moa gua (Chinese: 毛瓜; pinyin: máoguā; Jyutping: mou4 gwaa1; lit. 'hairy gourd').

In English, the fruit is known by a variety of names including hairy melon, hairy gourd, hairy cucumber, fuzzy gourd, fuzzy squash, Chinese preserving melon, wax gourd, or small winter melon.

== Cultivation ==
The fruit is produced on vines in warm temperatures, at 25°C to 35°C, and is sensitive to frost. In China, it is commonly cultivated in Guangdong and Guangxi.

== Uses ==
Chi quas, covered by a coating of fine hairs, must be prepared carefully to avoid skin irritations. While young chi quas can be eaten raw, they are usually cooked. They are prepared and eaten in a similar fashion to summer squash or zucchini. In China, they are usually eaten in the summer. The gourd is also used in Andean, Caribbean, East African, Indian, Mexican, South American and Southeast Asian cuisine.
