= Mor Kuzhambu =

Curry made with buttermilk and vegetables

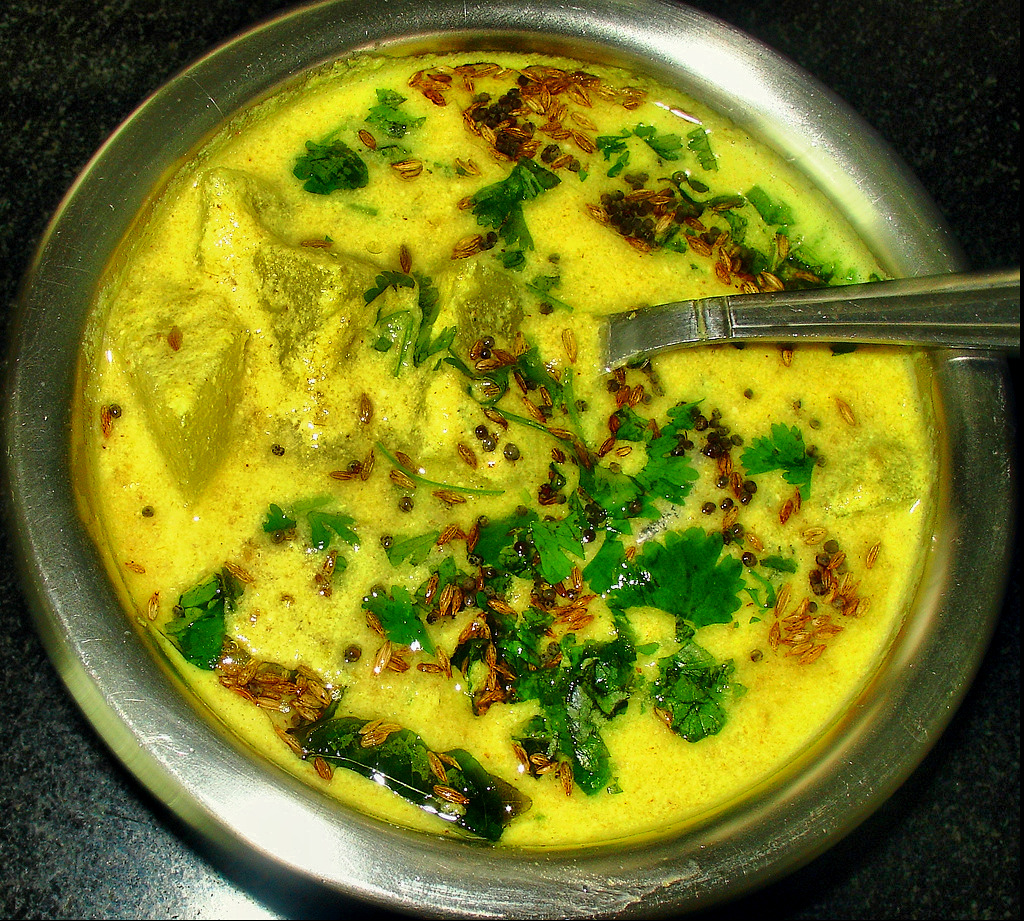
Mor Kuzhambu (Kaalan)

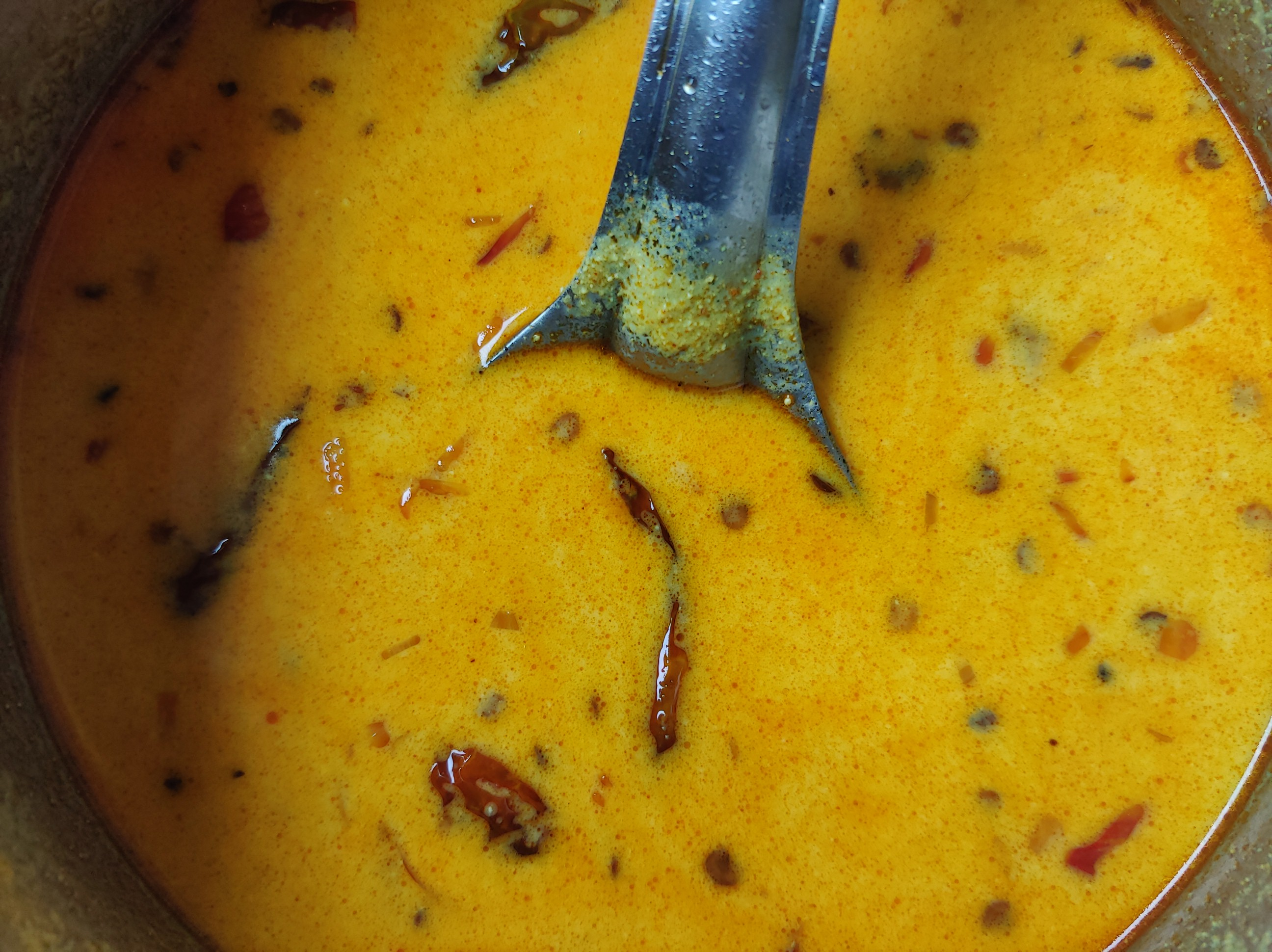
Buttermilk Curry (Moru curry) from Kerala

Buttermilk Kuzhambu or Moru Curry(Malayalam) Mor Kuzhambu(Tamil) is a commonly prepared dish in Kerala and Tamil Nadu. This is a liquid curry recipe which is served with white or boiled rice, pancake made of lentils / mixed gram dosa.

Traditionally, it includes vegetables like okra, winter melon or ash gourd, colocasia, etc. The taste is a bit sour, and it is a dish of Tamil Nadu. It is widely prepared on festivals as a special dish. It is often served with hot steamed rice and potato fries.

In Kerala there are two variants of this curry. One with vegetables and other without any vegetables. Ash gourd is the common vegetable in this kind of curry it is called Kaalan. Also, the curry without vegetables is called Buttermilk curry.

This is very rich in calcium and vitamin C, and has very low cholesterol.
