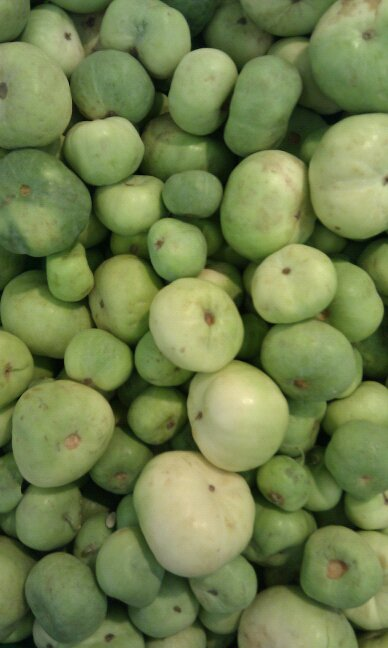

Scientific classification
- Kingdom: Plantae
- Clade: Embryophytes
- Clade: Tracheophytes
- Clade: Spermatophytes
- Clade: Angiosperms
- Clade: Eudicots
- Clade: Rosids
- Order: Cucurbitales
- Family: Cucurbitaceae
- Genus: Benincasa
- Species: B. fistulosa

Binomial name
- Benincasa fistulosa (Stocks) H.Schaef. & S.S.Renner (2011)

Synonyms
- Citrullus fistulosus Stocks (1851); Citrullus lanatus var. fistulosus (Stocks) Duthie & J.B.Fuller (1977); Citrullus vulgaris var. fistulosus (Stocks) J.L.Stewart (1869); Colocynthis citrullus var. fistulosus (Stocks) Chakrav. (1959); Praecitrullus fistulosus (Stocks) Pangalo (1944)

= Tinda =

Species of flowering plant

Benincasa fistulosa, commonly known as tinda, also called Indian squash, round melon, Indian round gourd, apple gourd or Indian baby pumpkin, is a squash-like cucurbit grown for its immature fruit, a vegetable especially popular in South Asia.

== Description and use in cooking ==
The plant is as with all cucurbits, a prolific vine, and is grown as an annual. The plant also is prickly with small thorns. The fruit is approximately spherical, and 5–8 cm in diameter. The seeds may also be roasted and eaten. Tinda is a famous nickname among Punjabi families in both India and Pakistan.

This unique squash-like gourd is native to India and Pakistan, and is very popular in Indian and Pakistani cooking with curry and many gourmet dishes. The green, apple-sized fruit is flattish round in shape and 50–60 grams in weight. The plants are vigorous, productive and begin to bear fruit 70 days after planting.

== Variant names ==
Tinda is also called aibhi (ऐभी) or "हस्तिघोषालताफलम्" (elephant's nest fruit) in Sanskrit . It is called tindsi in Rajasthan, and in Marathi it is called dhemase (ढेमसे). In Hindi and Marathi it is called dilpasand, and in Sindhi it is called meha (Sindhi: ميها).

== Similarly-named plants ==
Tinda can be confused with tendli or kundru due to similar-sounding names from different languages and regions. In Punjabi, Hindi, and most other North Indian languages, the word tinda means "Indian baby pumpkin".

== Production ==
Global production of the tinda fruit was estimated to be about 1.3 million tonnes in 2013. India is the largest producer of tinda with the States of Punjab and Haryana being the predominant producers. A hearty variant called Hisar Tinda produced in Hisar, Haryana being more resistant to mildew and cucurbit blights. Other major producers of Tinda include Pakistan, Bangladesh, China, Nepal, and Sri Lanka.
