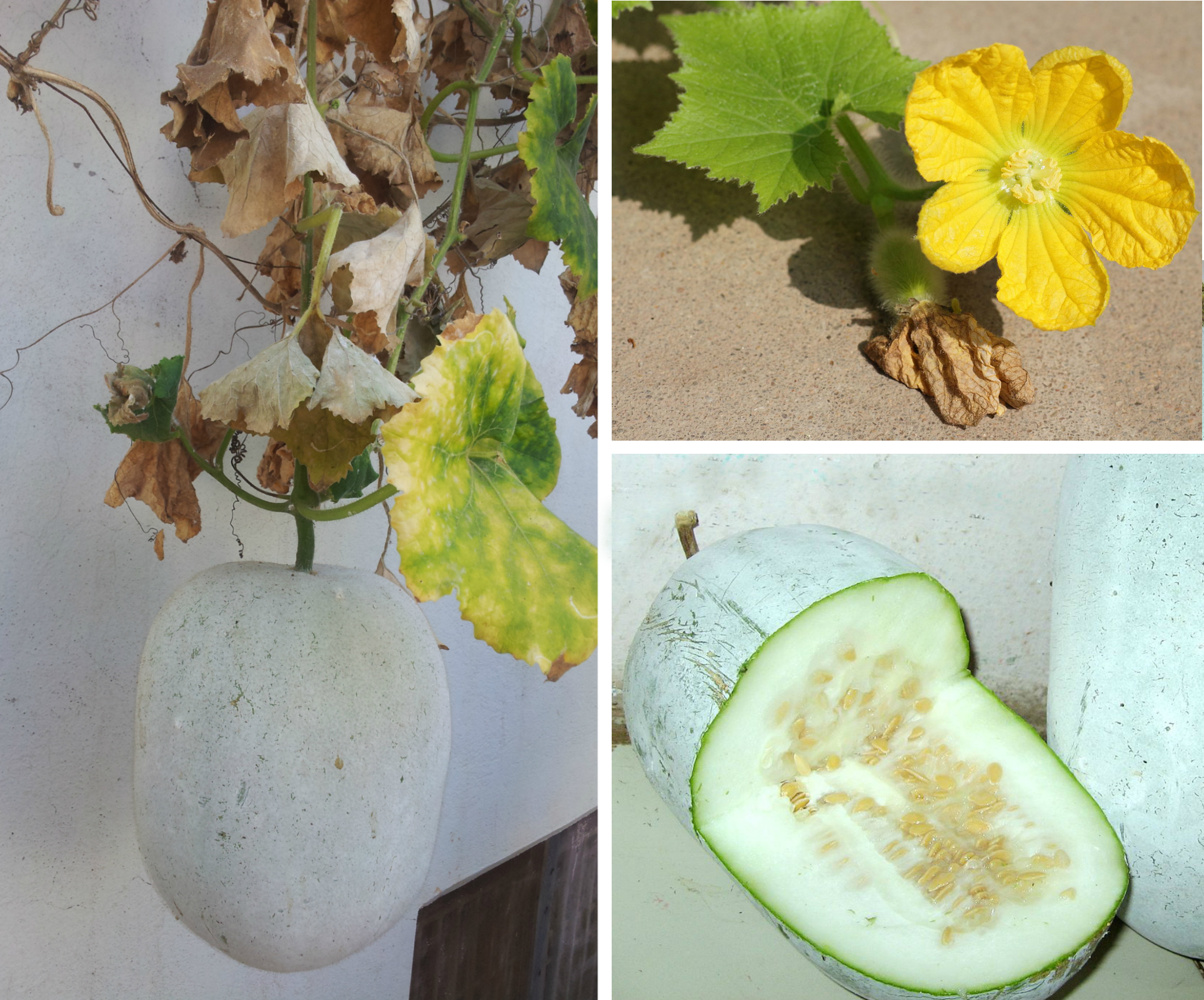
- Wax gourd plant, flower and immature and mature fruit

Scientific classification
- Kingdom: Plantae
- Clade: Tracheophytes
- Clade: Angiosperms
- Clade: Eudicots
- Clade: Rosids
- Order: Cucurbitales
- Family: Cucurbitaceae
- Genus: Benincasa
- Species: B. hispida

Binomial name
- Benincasa hispida (Thunb.) Cogn.

Synonyms
- List: Benincasa cerifera Savi; Benincasa cylindrica Ser. nom. inval.; Benincasa pruriens (Parkinson) W.J.de Wilde & Duyfjes nom. inval.; Benincasa vacua (F.Muell.) F.Muell.; Cucurbita alba Roxb. ex Wight & Arn.; Cucurbita farinosa Blume; Cucurbita hispida Thunb.; Cucurbita littoralis Hassk.; Cucurbita pruriens Parkinson nom. inval.; Cucurbita pruriens Seem.; Cucurbita vacua F.Muell.; Cucurbita villosa Blume; Gymnopetalum septemlobum Miq.

= Wax gourd =

Species of vine and edible fruit

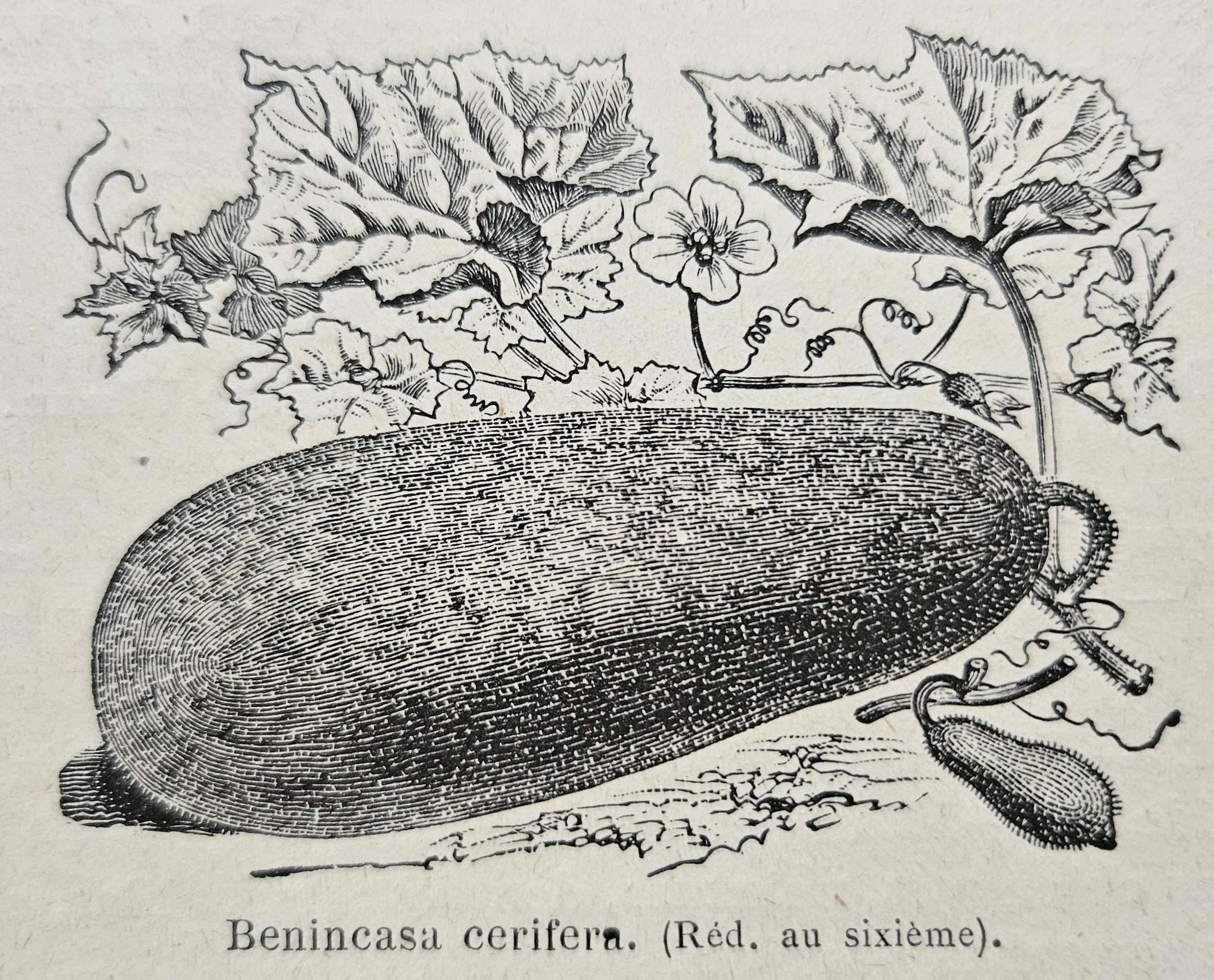
Illustration (as the synonym Benincasa cerifera) in "Les plantes potagères" Vilmorin 1925

Waxgourd, raw (Daily Value)
Nutritional value per 100 g (3.5 oz)
- Energy: 54 kJ (13 kcal)
- Carbohydrates: 3 g
- Dietary fibre: 2.9 g
- Fat: 0.2 g
- Protein: 0.4 g
Vitamins and minerals
Vitamins	Quantity %DV^{†}
Thiamine (B1)	3% 0.04 mg
Riboflavin (B2)	8% 0.11 mg
Niacin (B3)	3% 0.4 mg
Pantothenic acid (B5)	3% 0.133 mg
Vitamin B6	2% 0.035 mg
Folate (B9)	1% 5 μg
Vitamin C	14% 13 mg
Minerals	Quantity %DV^{†}
Calcium	1% 19 mg
Iron	2% 0.4 mg
Magnesium	2% 10 mg
Phosphorus	2% 19 mg
Potassium	0% 6 mg
Selenium	0% 0.2 μg
Sodium	5% 111 mg
Zinc	6% 0.61 mg
- Other constituents: Quantity
- Water: 96.1 g
- Link to USDA Database entry values are for edible portion
- ^{†}Percentages estimated using US recommendations for adults, except for potassium, which is estimated based on expert recommendation from the National Academies.

Benincasa hispida, the wax gourd, also called ash gourd, white gourd, winter gourd, winter melon, tallow gourd, ash pumpkin, dongah or Chinese preserving melon, is a species of gourd.

The wax gourd is native to South and Southeast Asia. It is grown, especially in Asia, for its very large fruit, eaten as a vegetable when mature. One variety of the plant, called chi qua (Benincasa hispida var. chieh-qua), is commonly used in Asian cuisine.

== Description ==
The plant grows thick vines with coarse, hairy stems. It has large, rough leaves between 10–30 centimetres (4–12 in) long.

In early summer from June to September, golden yellow flowers form in the leaf axils.

After they are pollinated, they bear obloid fruit 50–60 cm (20–24 in) long and 10–25 cm wide. They typically weigh 5–10 kg, with weights of up to 34.5 kg recorded. The young fruit are covered with soft fuzzy hairs which eventually disappear and develop a waxy coating that gives the fruit a shelf life of up to a year. The fruit has thick flesh that is sweet, crisp and juicy; it has white or yellow seeds.

== Etymology ==
The name "winter melon" that is sometimes given to this plant is based on the Chinese name dōngguā (冬瓜); however, the character 瓜 (guā) can also mean "gourd" or "squash". It is likely that the name "melon" is given because this gourd is sometimes candied or made into a sweet tea.

The name "wax gourd" comes from the wax coating in the fruit's skin.

== Distribution and habitat ==
The wax gourd is native to South and Southeast Asia. It is widely grown throughout Asia, including Java and Japan, the places where it is thought to have originated. The wax gourd is also grown in Central America, primarily along the Pacific coast of Nicaragua.

== Cultivation ==
It is grown in well-drained loam and sandy soils in warm, mild climates, and will not tolerate frosts. It is grown in riverbeds or furrows, and needs constant irrigation during the growing season.

== Uses ==
=== Culinary ===
The fruit, seeds, buds and young leaves can be eaten cooked, resembling pumpkin or zucchini. The gourd can be stored for many months, much like winter squash.

Ash gourds of the Indian subcontinent have a white coating with a rough texture (hence the name ash gourd). Southeast Asian varieties have a smooth waxy texture. It is one of the few vegetables available during winter in areas of deciduous vegetation. In India, the wax gourd is viewed as having medicinal properties in the Ayurvedic system of medicine. It is also viewed as having significance in spiritual traditions of India and Yoga, where it is identified as a great source of prana.

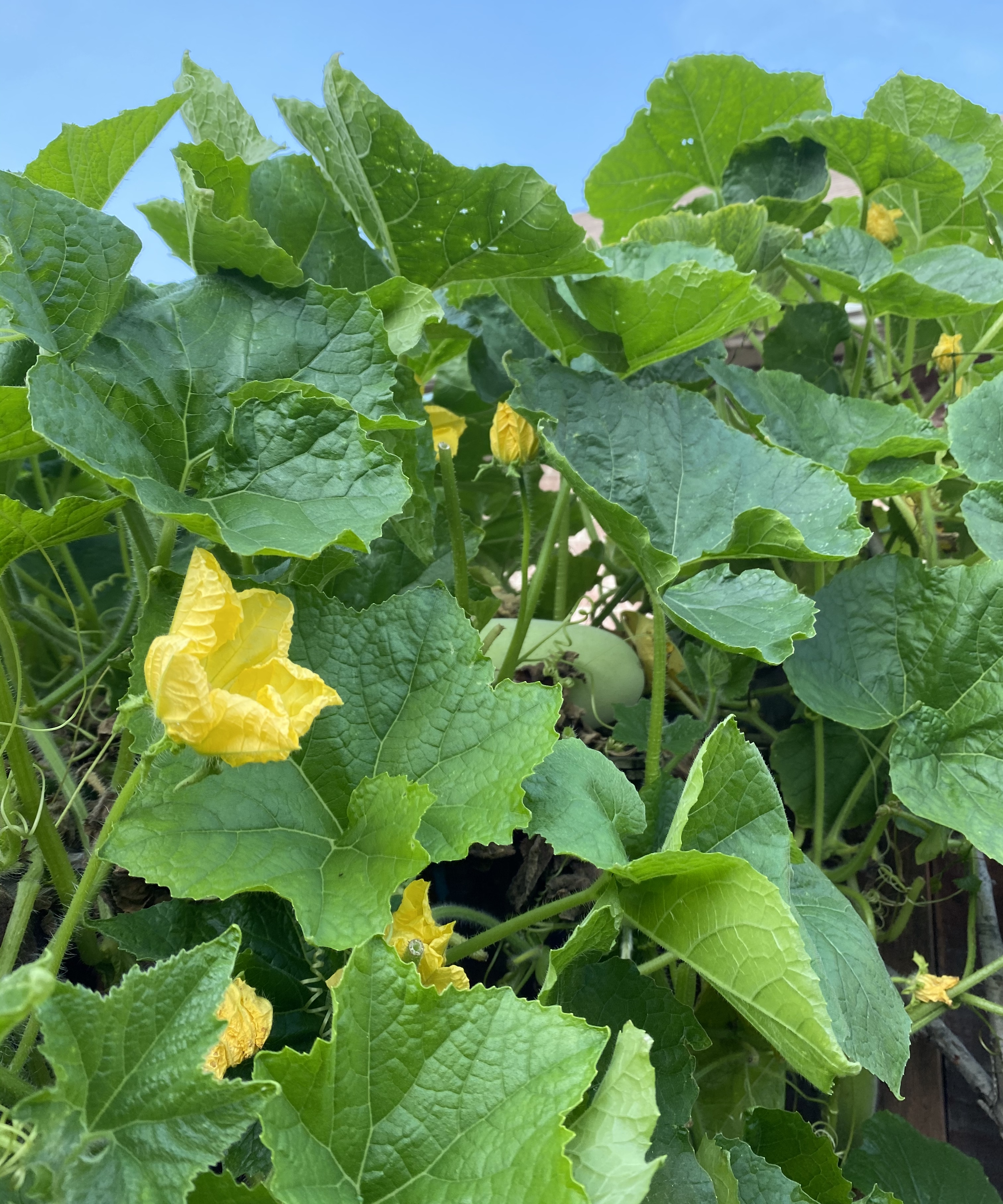
Winter melon plant in Cambodia

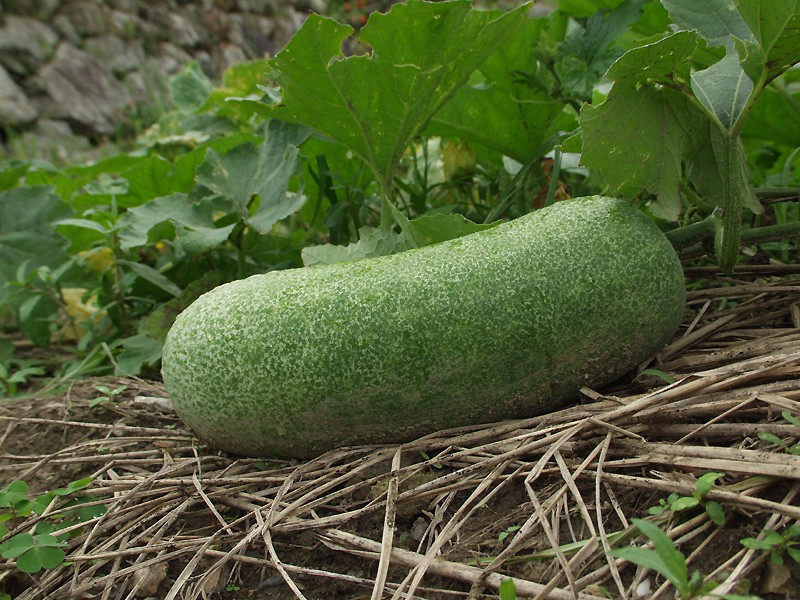
Nearly mature wax gourd

In Cambodia, it is known as tralach (Khmer: ត្រឡាច), and used in soup and stews in Cambodian cuisine. It is commonly used to make samlor tralach, which is winter gourd and pork soup, or stuffed pork in the gourd.

In Chinese cuisine, the gourds are used in stir fries or combined with pork or pork/beef bones to make winter gourd soup, often served in the scooped out gourd, carved by scraping off the waxy coating. It is also chopped and candied as wintermelon candy (dōng guā táng), commonly eaten at New Year festivals, or as filling for Sweetheart cake (lǎopó bǐng). It has also been used as the base filling in Chinese and Taiwanese mooncakes for the Moon Festival.

In Vietnamese cuisine, it is called bí đao, and is usually used to make soup or stew. When cooked with pork short ribs, the resulting soup is traditionally thought to help produce more milk for breastfeeding mothers.

In the Philippines, it is called kundol and is candied or used as a pastry filling for hopia. It is also an ingredient in some savory soups (sabáw) and stir-fried (guisado) dishes.

In Indian cuisine, it is traditionally used to prepare a wide variety of dishes. In northern India it is used to prepare a candy called petha. In South Indian cuisine, it is traditionally used to make a variety of curries, including sāmbār and a stew (mōr kuḻambu, made with a yogurt base. The juice of the raw ash gourd (Maipawl or Khar) is used by the Mizo community and indigenous Assamese ethnicities of North-East India as a natural remedy to treat mild to severe dysentery. In north India, particularly in the middle Himalayas, it is paired with pulses such as moong which, when crushed, along with winter gourd, make a dish locally called bori. When dried in sunlight it becomes somewhat hard and is used in curry dishes and eaten with rice or chapati. This practice is especially prevalent in the Himalayas due to the long shelf life of the resulting product.

In western Bihar as well as eastern Uttar Pradesh, it is called bhathua (भथुआ). In Sri Lanka, it is called puhul (පුහුල්) and alu puhul (අළු පුහුල්). In Andhra Pradesh, it is called Boodida Gummadikaya (బూడిద గుమ్మడికాయ Telugu). It is used to make stews, stir fries and vadialu. Vadialu are made by chopping the gourd into small pieces and mixing with ground urad beans and spices, then sun-drying. To eat, vadialu are deep fried in oil and eaten as an accompaniment to rice and sambar or lentil stews.

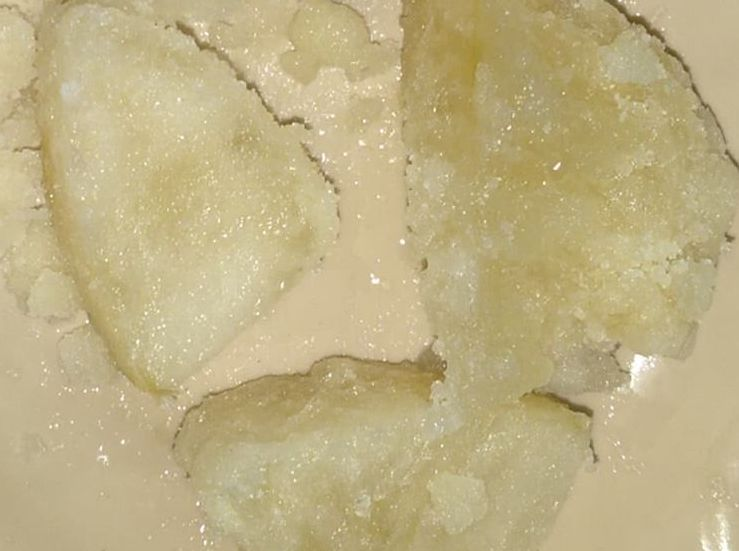
Murabba made from wax gourd

It is known as Kohalaa (कोहळा) in the Marathi language. Kohala is used to prepare a sweet dish called Kohalyachi Vadee, a kind of Barfi. It is also used to make Sambar.

In Gujarat, it is called kolu (કોળુ).

In Bengal, it is called "ChaalKumro" (চালকুমড়ো ). There are various dished made with it, viz., ChalKumro’r Bora, Chalkumro ghonto, Chalkumror dudh curry, Chal kumro with mung dal, etc.

In Odisha it is called (ପାଣି କଖାରୁ), it is used in various types of recipe all over Odisha. It is the main ingredient to prepare a candy-like food (ବଡ଼ି) for curry or as a supplement mainly with watered rice.

In Nepal, where it is called Kubhindo, it is cooked as a vegetable when young, but the ripe gourds are usually made into preserves or crystallized candy known as "murabba" or "petha".

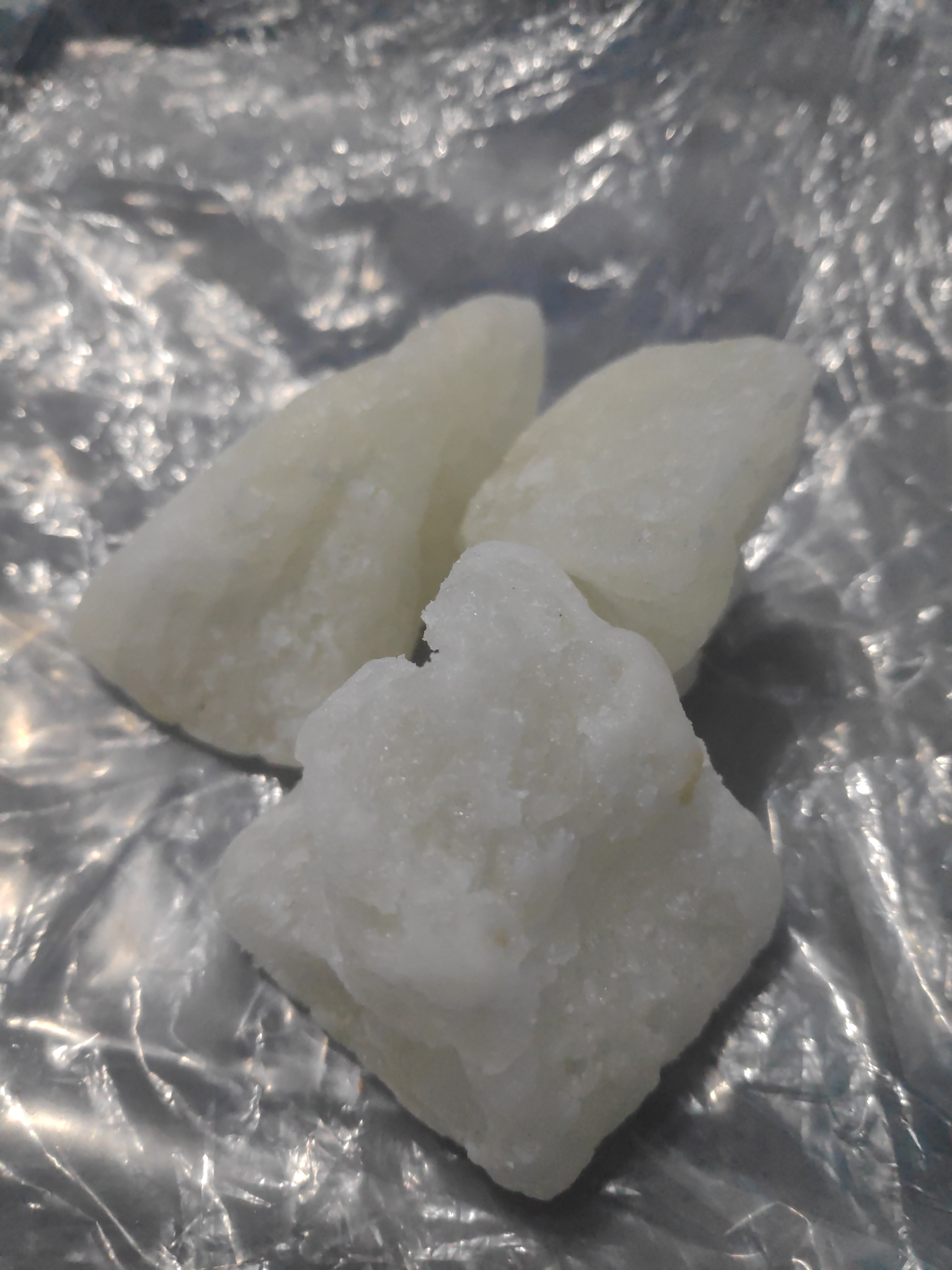
Murabba made from ash gourd from Nepal

Occasionally, it is used to produce a fruit drink, usually sweetened with caramelized sugar. In Southeast Asia, the drink is marketed as wax gourd tea or wax gourd punch.

In Nicaragua, the plant is known in Spanish as toncúa and is eaten candied, flavored with cinnamon sticks and fig leaves. The municipality of Chinandega recognized candied wax gourd, or toncúa en miel, as the official dessert/candy in 2016.

The shoots, tendrils, and leaves of the plant are sometimes eaten as greens.

=== Other purposes ===
The ash gourd is also used by Hindus as a sacrificial offering in lieu of animal sacrifice. The gourd is marked with vermillion and split in two with a sword.

In Kerala, the plant is called കുമ്പളം kumbalam and the fruit is called കുമ്പളങ്ങ kumbalanga or കൂശ്മാണ്ടം kooshmandam. It is traditionally used to offer 'Guruthi' (ഗുരുതി) instead of 'Kuruti' (കുരുതി) among Malayali Brahmins. Thus, instead of offering someone's life in the pyre, an ash gourd is cut into two as a symbolic performance in lieu of human sacrifice.

In Karnataka, the ash gourd is known as Boodu Kumbalakaayi (ಬೂದು ಕುಂಬಳಕಾಯಿ) (Kannada) and Boldu Kumbda in Tulu, and is used to prepare dishes like Kodel (Sambhar), Ale bajji, Kashi Halwa and chutney. It is widely used during Dasara and other festivities while performing pooje.

Its fruit was often dried as containers to store infused coconut oil among Polynesians (known as fa(n)gu or hue ʻaroro – latter not to be confused with the other hue gourd).

== Cultural significance ==
In mid-2020, several U.S. states reported unsolicited packages containing unknown and unidentified seeds of various kinds; the envelopes presented Chinese text in many cases. At least one person planted one type of these seeds, which grew into B. hispida and was analyzed before state officials destroyed the plant.

== Gallery ==
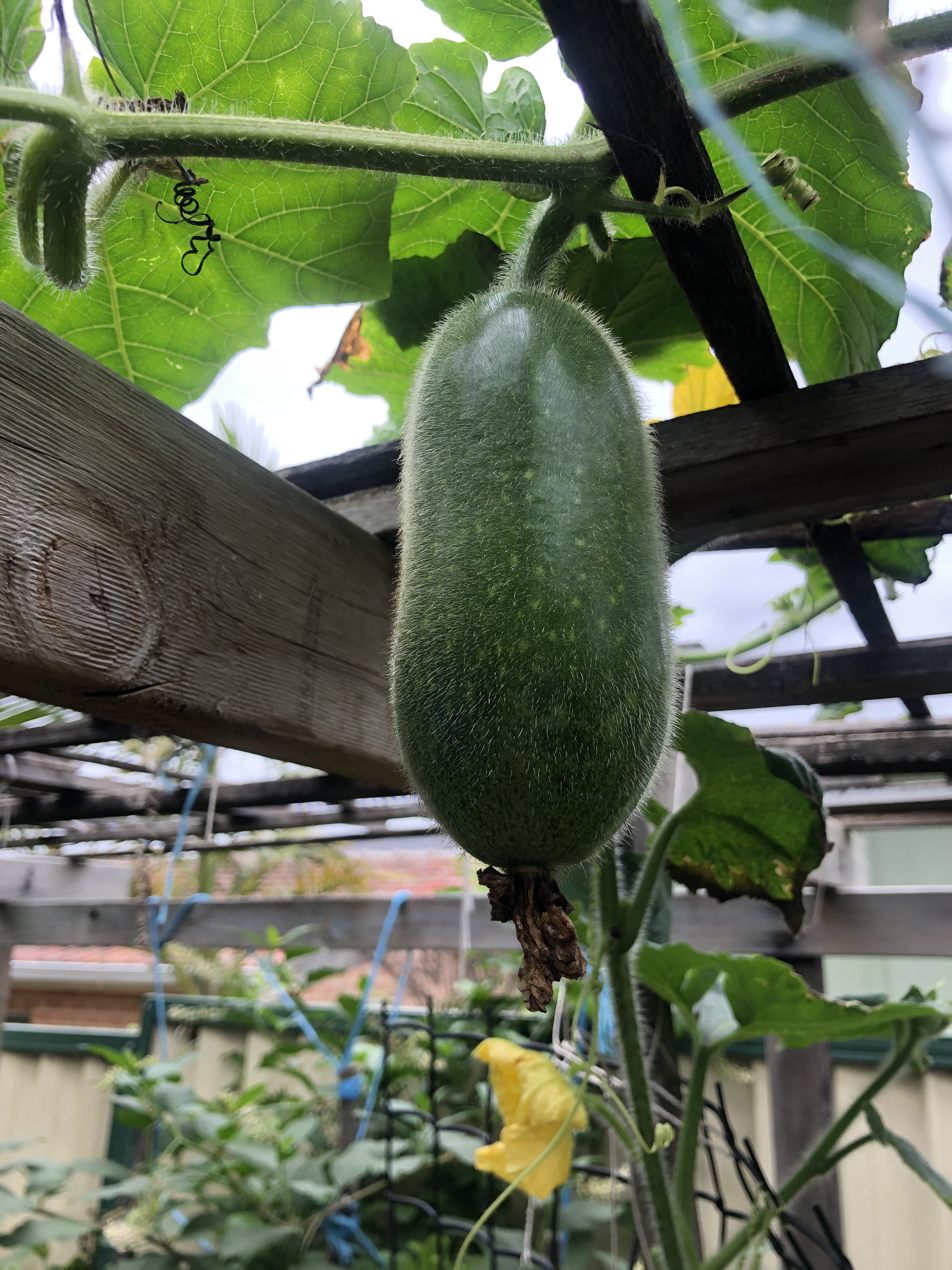
Wax gourd two weeks after flowering

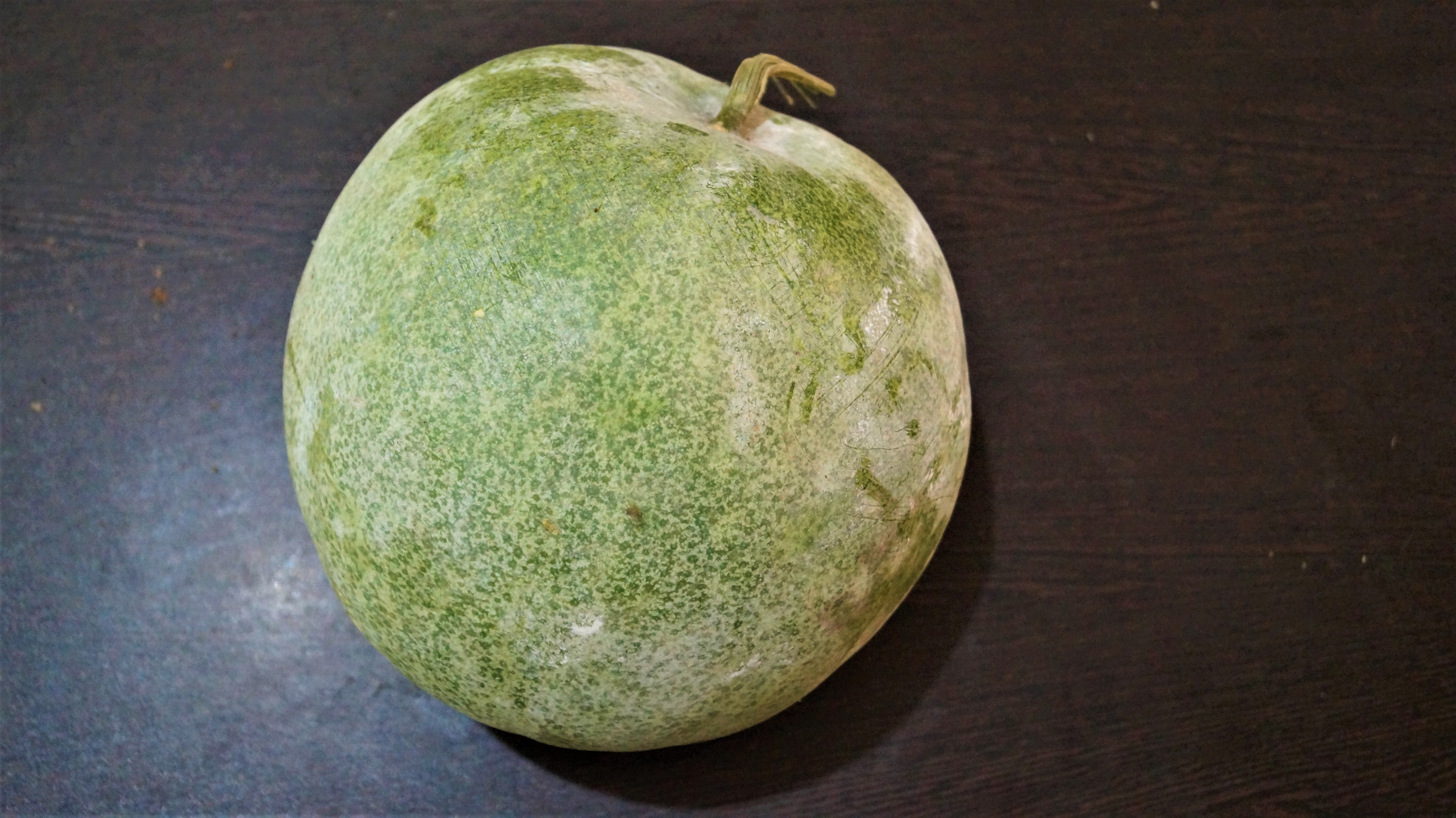
Indian ash gourd

Gourd flower.

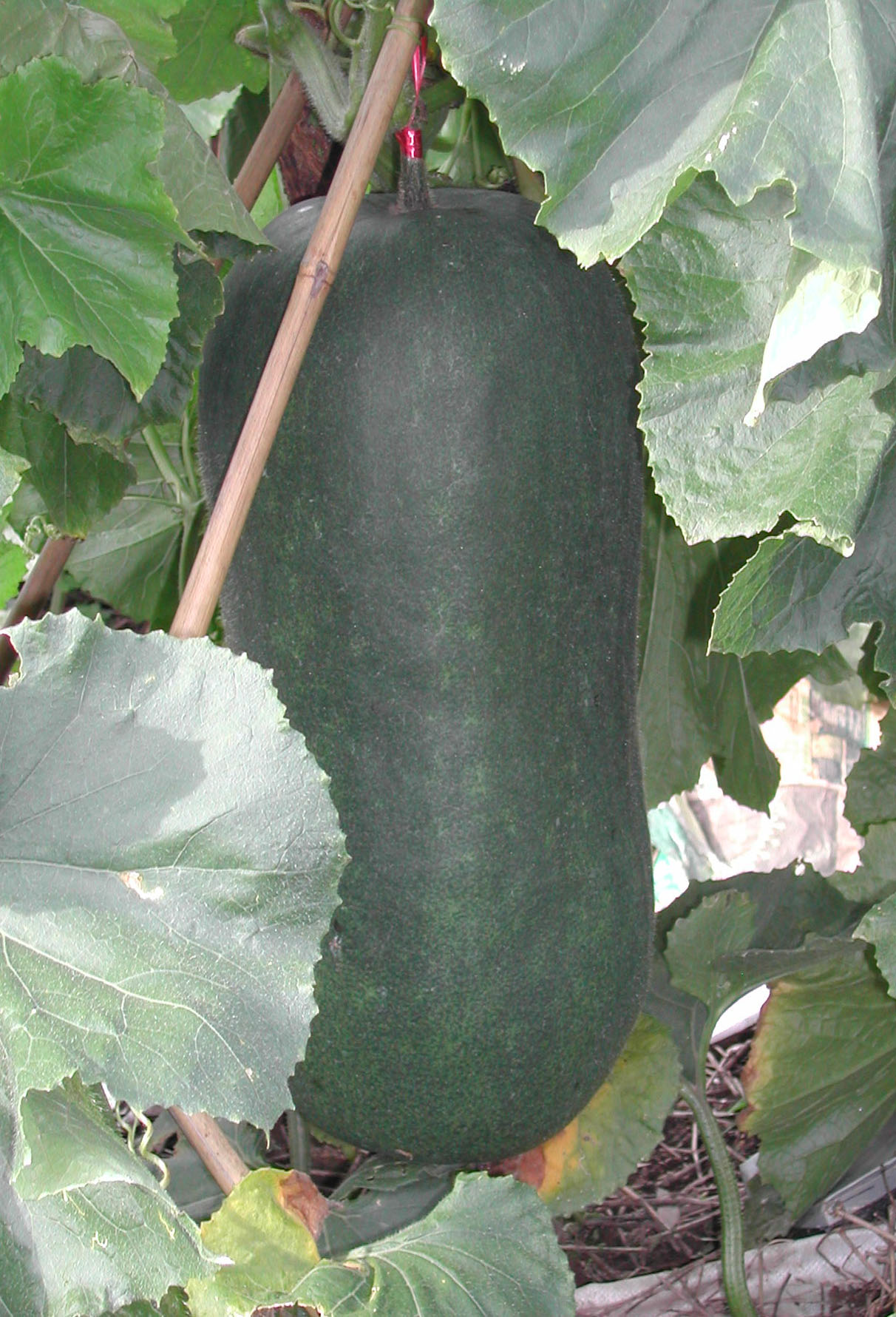
Wax gourd

Chinese winter melon soup

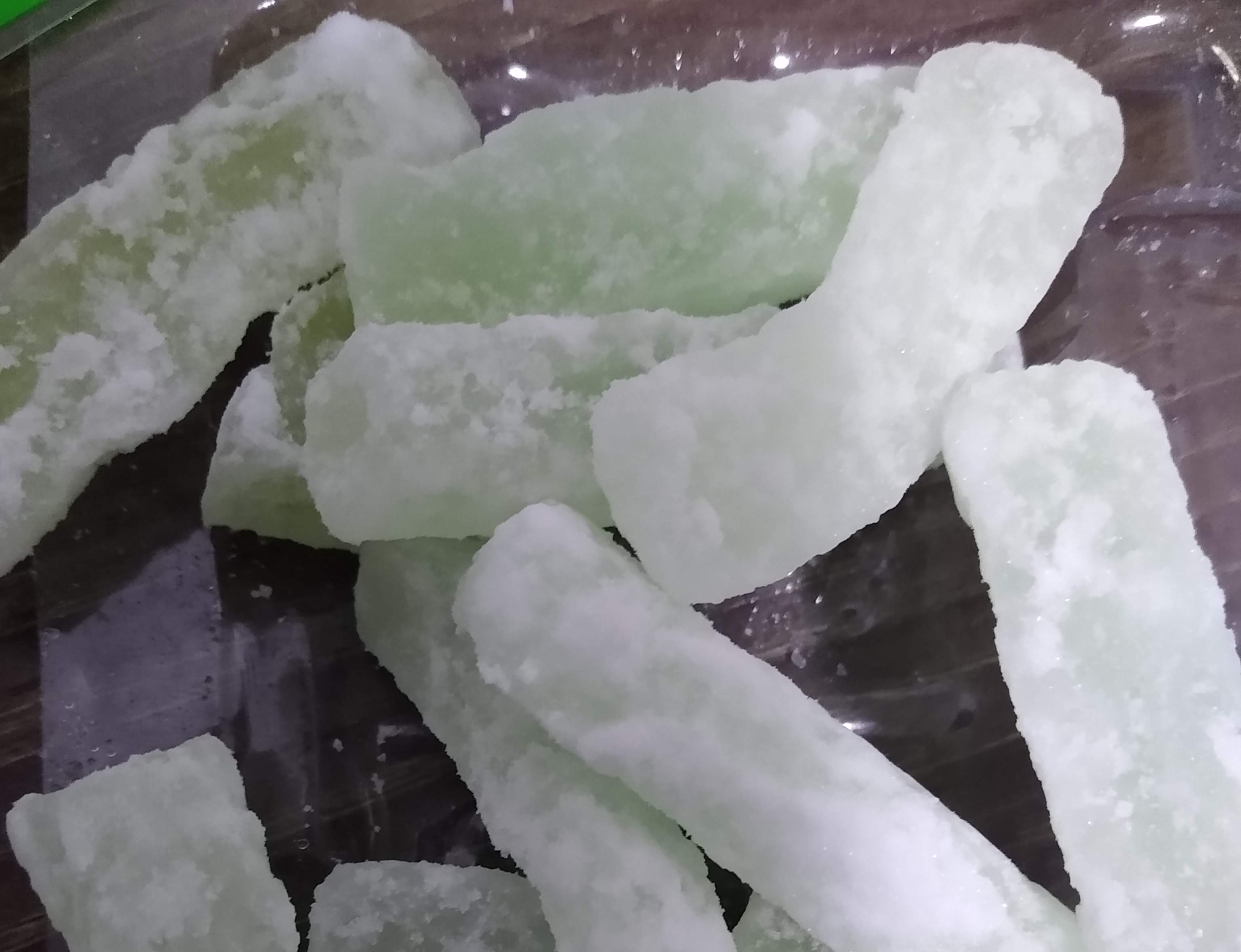
Chinese winter melon candy

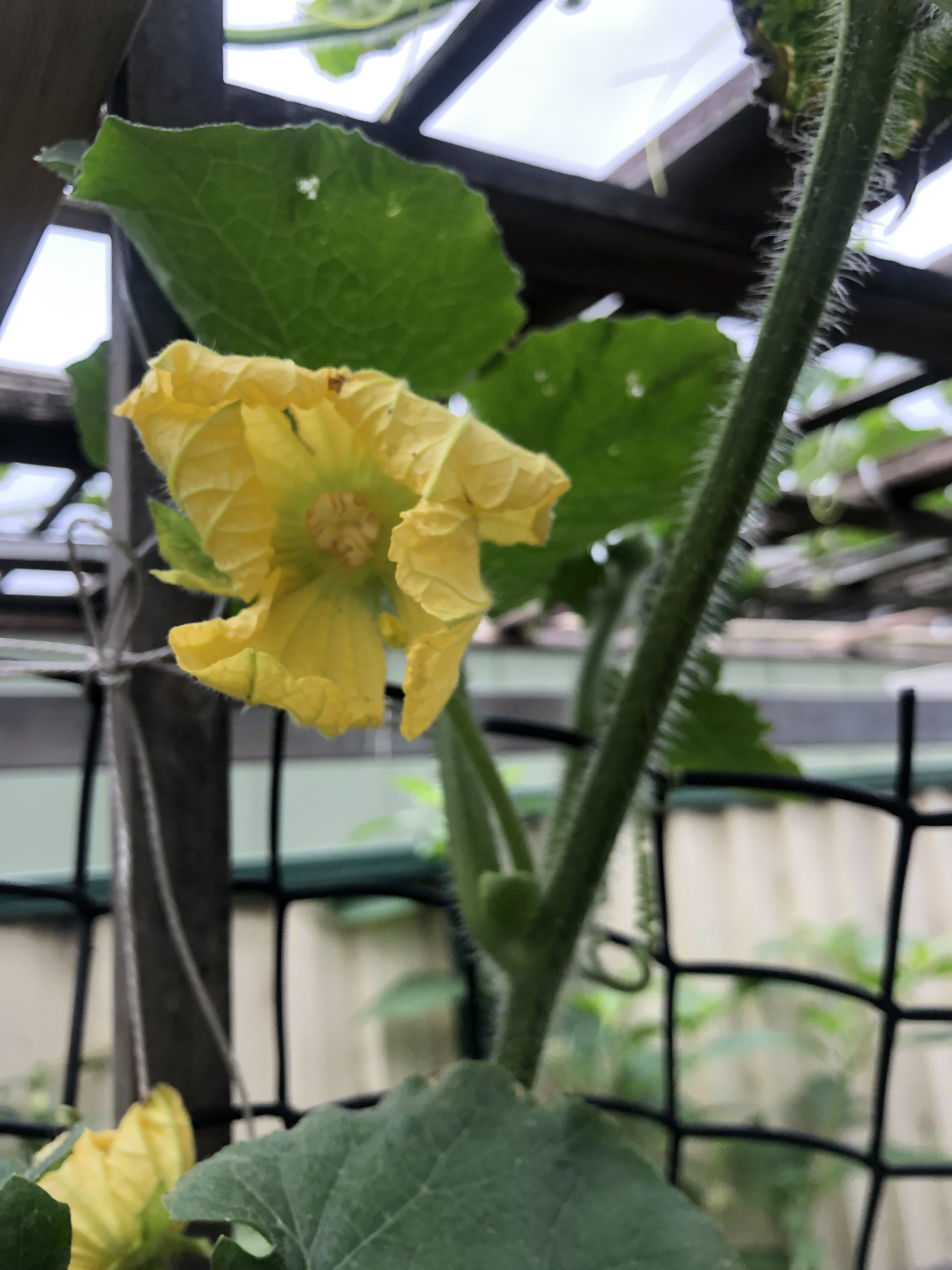
Wax gourd plant flowering

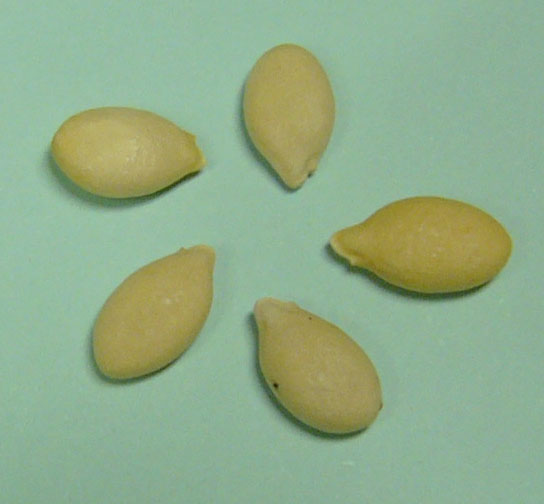
Seeds
