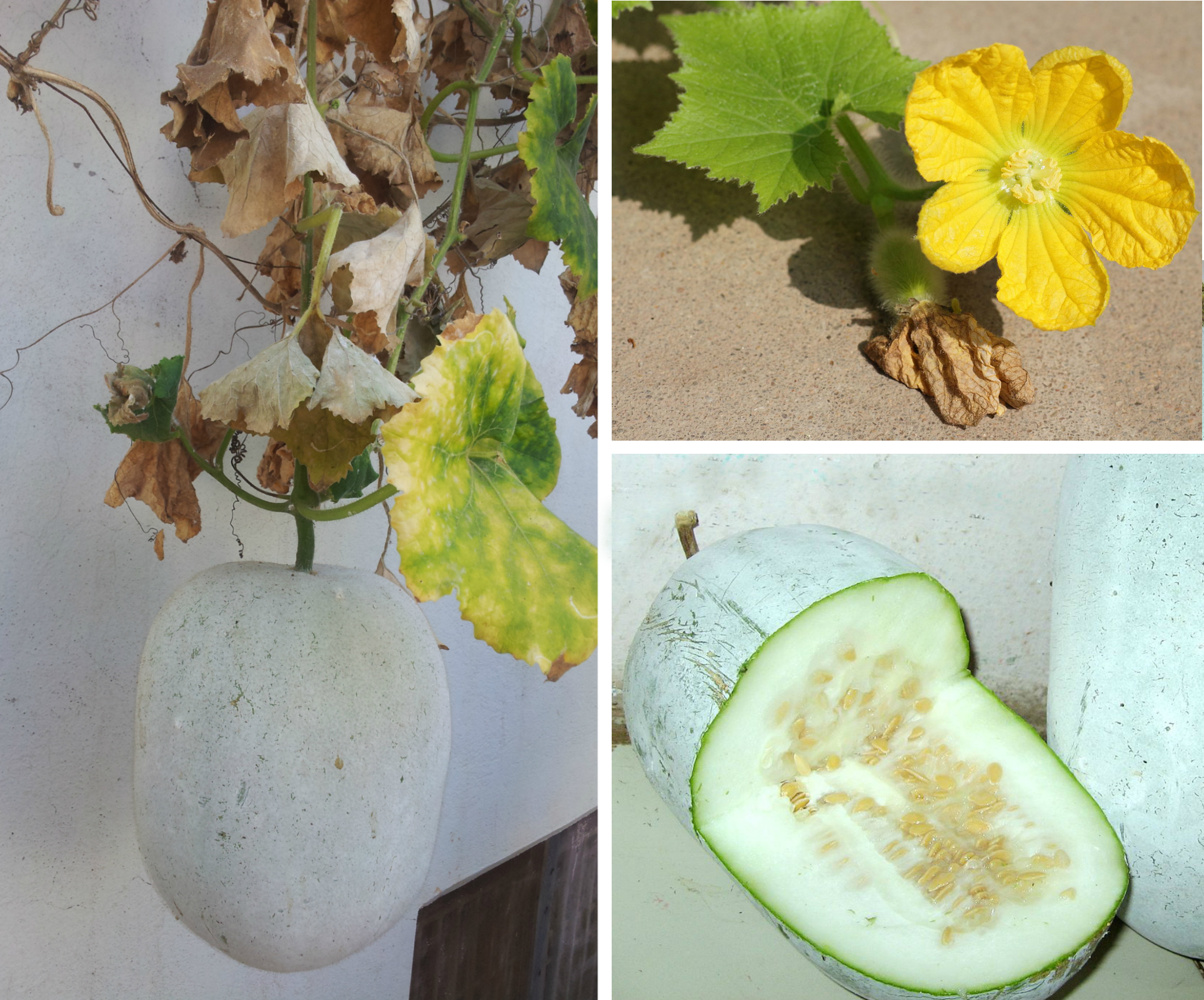
- Benincasa hispida plant, flower and immature and mature fruit

Scientific classification
- Kingdom: Plantae
- Clade: Tracheophytes
- Clade: Angiosperms
- Clade: Eudicots
- Clade: Rosids
- Order: Cucurbitales
- Family: Cucurbitaceae
- Subfamily: Cucurbitoideae
- Tribe: Benincaseae
- Genus: Benincasa; Savi (1818)

Species
- Benincasa fistulosa (Stocks) H.Schaef. & S.S.Renner; Benincasa hispida (Thunb.) Cogn.

Synonyms
- Camolenga Post & Kuntze (1903); Praecitrullus Pangalo (1944)

= Benincasa =

Genus of flowering plants

Benincasa is a genus of flowering plants in the cucumber family, Cucurbitaceae. It includes two species native to Indomalaya and Australasia:

- Benincasa fistulosa (Stocks) H.Schaef. & S.S.Renner – tinda
- Benincasa hispida (Thunb.) Cogn. – wax gourd
