= List of plants used in Indian cuisine =

South Asian cuisine encompasses a delectable variety of sub-cuisines and cooking styles that vary very widely, reflecting the diversity of the Indian subcontinent, even though there is a certain centrality to the general ingredients used. Terms used the recipes of varied Indian and other South Asian sub-cuisines sometimes tend to be multi-lingual and region-specific, mostly based on the author's specific sub-ethnicity, the popularity of a given vegetable/spice in a given sub-cuisine within South Asia, etc.

Indian cuisine is overwhelmingly vegetarian friendly and employs a variety of different fruits, vegetables, grains, and spices which vary in name from region to region within the country. Most Indian restaurants serve predominantly Punjabi/North Indian cuisine, while a limited few serve a very limited choice of some South Indian dishes like Dosa. But for the connoisseurs, India offers a complex and eclectic array of sub-cuisines to explore, which are equally vegetarian friendly and a delight to the taste buds.

Even for South Asian people, this wide variety of vegetables, fruits, grains and spices used in various Indian sub-cuisines can be mind-boggling because of the variety of region-specific names used for identifying the food items. Indian vegetable markets and grocery stores get their wholesale supplies from suppliers belonging to various regions/ethnicities from all over India and elsewhere, and the food suppliers/packagers mostly use sub-ethnic, region-specific item/ingredient names on the respective signs/labels used to identify specific vegetables, fruits, grains and spices based on their respective regions of origin. This further aggravates the confusion in identifying specific items/ingredients, especially for international consumers/expatriates looking to procure vegetables, fruits, grains and spices specific to Indian sub-cuisines.

This article attempts to centralize, compile and tabulate the various vegetables, fruits, grains and spices that are commonly employed in various South Asian sub-cuisines to help reduce this confusion in identifying and procuring various South Asian food ingredients, especially in the cross-regional, international markets/contexts.

The following is a list of common South Asian ingredients, as well as their names in various local languages spoken.

== Pulses and dry legumes ==
Pulse names by various Indian and Sri Lankan languages
Hindi	English	Botanical name	Assamese	Bengali	Gujarati	Kannada	Malayalam	Marathi	Oriya	Punjabi	Sinhala	Tamil	Telugu	Tulu	Urdu	Konkani	Meitei	Nepali	Maithili	Rajasthani
दाल (Dāl)	Pulses/ Split beans / bean		দাইল (Dāil)	ডাল (Ḍāl)	દાળ (Dāḷ)	ಬೇಳೆ (Bēḷe)	പരിപ്പ് (Parippu)	डाळ; Ḍāḷ	ଡାଲି (Ḍāli)	ਦਾਲ (Dāl)	පරිප්පු (Parippu)	பருப்பு (Paruppu)	పప్పు (Pappu)	ಸಾಲೈ (Salāyi)	دال (Dăl)	डाळ (Ḍāḷ)	ꯍꯋꯥꯏ (Hawāi)	दाल (Dāl)	দালি (Dāil)	दाळ/द्विदळ (Dāḷ/Dvidaḷ)
तुअर/अरहर दाल (Tuar/Arhar Dāl)	Pigeon Pea / Yellow Split Gram	Cajanus cajan	ৰহৰ দাইল (Rôhôr Dāil)	অড়হর ডাল (Arhôr Ḍāl)	તુવેર દાળ (Tuver Dāḷ)	ತೊಗರಿ ಬೇಳೆ (Togari Beḷe)	തുവര/സാമ്പര പരിപ്പ് (Thuvara/Sambhar Parippu)	तूर डाळ (Tūr Ḍāḷ)	ହରଡ଼ ଡାଲି (Håråṛå Ḍāli)	ਅਰਹਰ ਦਾਲ (Arhar Dāl)	තෝර පරිප්පු (Thora Parippu)	துவரம் பருப்பு (Thuvaram Paruppu)	కంది పప్పు (Kandi Pappu)	ತೋಗಾರಿ ಸಾಲೈ (Tōgari Salāyi)	ارہر (Arhar)	तोरी डाळ (Tori Ḍāḷ)	ꯍꯋꯥꯏ ꯀꯪꯇꯥꯛ (Hawāi Kangtak)	रहर दाल (Rahar Dāl)	ৰাহাৰি দালি (Rāhèr Dāil)	अरड़/अड़द दाळ (Araṛ/Aṛad Dāḷ)
काबुली चना (Kābuli Chanā)/ छोले (Chhole)	Garbanzo Beans/ Chickpea	Cicer arietinum	কাবুলি বুট (Kābuli But)	কাবুলি ছোলা/কাবুলি চানা/কাবুলি বুট ( Kābuli Chholā/ Kābuli Chānā/ Kābuli Buṭ)	કાબુલી ચણા (Kābuli Chaṇā) છોલે ચણા (Chhole Chaṇā)	ಕಡಲೆ ಕಾಳು (Kaḍale Kāḷu)	വെള്ള കടല (Veḷḷa Kaḍala)	काबुली चणे (Kābuli Chaṇe)	ଧଳା/କଳା କାବୁଲିଆ ଚଣା (Dhåḷā/Kåḷā Kābuliyā Chåṇā)	ਸਫੈਦ ਛੋਲੇ/ਚਣੇ (Safaid Chhole/Chaṇe)	කඩල (Kaḍala)	கொண்டை கடலை / வெள்ளை கடலை (Konḍai Kaḍalai/ Veḷḷai Kaḍalai)	బుద్దా సెసగలు/సనగలు (Budda Senagalu /Sanagalu)	ಬೊಲ್ದು ಕಡ್ಲೆ (Boldu Kaḍle)	(Kabli chana) كابلي چنا	चणे (Tsaṇe/Chaṇe)	ꯍꯋꯥꯏ ꯀꯪꯘꯧ/ꯆꯅꯥ ꯀꯪꯘꯧ (Hawāi Kanghou/Chanā Kanghou)	काबुली चना (Kābuli Chanā)	কাবুলী চনা (Kābuli Chanā)	काबली चणां (Kābli Chaṇā̃)
चना (Chanā)		Cicer arietinum		ছোলা (Chholā)	ચણા (Chaṇā)	ಕಡಲೆ (Kaḍale)	കടല (Kaḍala)	हरभरा (Harbharā)	ଭୁୁଟ/ବୁଟ (Bhuṭå/Buṭå)	ਛੋਲੇ (Choleh)		கடலை (Kaḍalai)	సెనగలు/సనగలు (Senagalu/Sanagalu)	Kaḍle (ಕಡ್ಲೆ)	چنا			चना (Chanā)	বূট (Būṭ)	चणां (Chaṇā̃)
कुलथी (Kulthi)	Horse gram	Macrotyloma uniflorum	কুুলথি কলাই (Kulthi Kalāi)	কুলথি ডাল (Kulthi Ḍāl)	કળથી ડાળ (Kaḷthi Dāḷ)	ಹುರಳಿ ಬೇಳೆ (Huraḷi Beḷe)	മുതിര പരിപ്പ് (Muthira Parippu)	कुळीथ/हुलगे डाळ (Kuḷith/Hulge Ḍāḷ)	କୋଳଥ ଡାଲି (Koḷåthå Ḍāli)	ਕੁਲਥੀ/ਕਲਥੀ ਦੀ ਦਾਲ (Kulthi/Kalthi di Dal)	කොල්ලු (Kollu)	கொள்ளு பருப்பு (Koḷḷu Paruppu)	ఉలవలు పప్పు (Ulavalu Pappu)	ಕುದು ಸಾಲೈ (Kudu Sālayi)	(Kulit)	कुळीथ डाळ (Kuḷith Ḍāḷ)		गहतको दाल (Gahatko Dāl)	কুৰ্থি দালি (Kurthi Dāil)	कुळथी दाळ (Kuḷthi Dāḷ)
लोबिया (Lobiā)	Black-eyed pea	Vigna unguiculata	লুবিয়া (Lubiā)	লোবিয়া/বরবটি কলাই (Lobiā/Borboti Kolāi)	સફેદ છોલા (Safed Cholā)	ಅಲಸಂದೆ (Alasande)	കരമണി/പയര് (Karamaṇi/ Pairu)	चवळी (Chawḷi)	ନାଦୁୁକ (Nādukå)	ਰੋਁਗੀ (Rongi)	කවුපි (Kawupi)	காராமணி பயறு /தட்டாம் பயறு (Karamaṇi Payaru/Thaṭṭam Payaru)	అలచందలు (Alachandalu)	ಲತಂದೆ/ಲತ್ತಣೆ ಬಿತ್ತ್ (Lathandè/lathaṇe Bitt)	Lobia لوبیا	अलसंदे (Alsande)	ꯍꯋꯥꯏꯖꯥꯔ ꯃꯥꯔꯨ (Hawaijar Maru)	लोबिया (Lobiā)	বোৰা (Borā)	चंवळो (Chãvḷo)
मसूर (Masūr)	Red Lentils	Lens culinaris	মচুৰ দাইল (Mosur Dail)	মসুর/মুসুরি ডাল (Moshur/Mushuri Ḍal)	મસુર દાળ (Masoor Dāḷ)	ಕೆಂಪು ತೊಗರಿ(Kempu Togari)	പരിപ്പ് (Parippu)	मसूर डाळ (Masur Ḍāḷ)	ସୁର/ମସୁର ଡାଲି (Sūrå/Måsūrå Ḍāli)	ਮਾਸਰ/ਪੀਲੀ ਦੀ ਦਾਲ (Masar/ Peeli di Daal)	මයිසූර් පරිප්පු (Mysore Parippu)	மைசூர் பருப்பு (Mysore Paruppu)	ఎర్ర కంది పప్పు (Erra Kandi Pappu)/ ఎర్ర కాందులు (Erra Kandulu)	ಕಜೆ ಸಾಲೈ/ತೊಗರಿ (Kajae Sālayi/Togari)	(Masoor) /مسور	मोसुुर डाळ (Mosur Ḍāḷ)	ꯍꯋꯥꯏ ꯃꯥꯏꯔꯣꯡꯕꯤ (Hawai Mairongbi)	मुसुरको दाल (Musurako Dāl)	মোসৰী দালি (Mosri Dāil)	मसूर/मसहूर दाळ (Masūr/Masahūr Dāḷ)
मूँग (Mūng)	Mung bean (Green gram)	Vigna Radiata	মগু দাইল (Mogu Dăil)	মুগ ডাল (Mug Ḍāl)	મગ દાળ (Mag Dāḷ)	ಪಚ್ಚೆಸರು / ಹೆಸರು ಬೇಳೆ (Pacchesaru / Hesaru Beḷe)	ചെറുപയർ (Cherupayar)	मूग (Mug Ḍāḷ)	ମୁଡ଼/ମୁଗ ଡାଲି (Muṛå/Mugå Ḍali)	ਮੁੰੰਗੀ ਦੀ ਦਾਲ (Mūngi di Daal)	මුං ඇට (Mung Eṭa)	பச்சை பயரு/பருப்பு (Pachai Payaru/Paruppu)	పెసర పప్పు (Pesara Pappu) /పెసలు (Pesalu)	ಪದೆಂಗಿ ಸಾಲೈ (Padengi Sālayi)	(Mūng) مونگ	मूग (Mūg Ḍāḷ)	ꯍꯋꯥꯏ ꯃꯨꯛ (Hawai Muk)	मुङ्ग दाल (Mung Dāl)	খেৰহী দালি (Kherhi Dāil)/ ওঙ্ক্রী দালি (Onkri Dāil)	मग/मोगर दाळ (Mag/Mogar Dāḷ)
तिल (Til)	Sesame	Sesamum indicum	তিল (Til)	তিল (Til)	તલ (Tal)	ಎಳ್ಳು(Eḷḷu)	എള്ള് (Eḷḷu)	तीळ (Tiḷ)	ରାଶି (Rāsi)	ਤੀਲ (Til)	තල (Thala)	எள் (Eḷu)	నువ్వులు (Nuvvulu) నువ్వు పప్పు (Nuvvu Pappu)	ಎಡ್ಮೆ/ಎಣ್ಮ (Eḍme/ Eṇme)	(Til) تل	तीळ (Tiḷ)	ꯊꯣꯏꯗꯤꯡ ꯑꯉꯒꯨꯕꯥ꯫ / ꯊꯣꯏꯗꯤꯡ ꯑꯃꯨꯕꯥ (Thoiding Angouba/Thoiding Amuba)	तील (Til)	তীল (Tīl)	तळ/तिल्ली (Taḷ/Tilli)
मोठ (Moṭh)	Moth bean (Turkish gram) Balls	Vigna aconitifolia		মথ/মঠ (Môth/Môṭh)	મઠ (Maṭh)	ತನ್ನಿ ಕಾಳು (Tanni Kāḷu)	മമ്പയർ (Mambayar)	मटकी (Maṭki)	କଞ୍ଚା ମୁୁ଼ଡ଼/ମୁଗ (Kånchā Muṛå/Mugå)	ਮੋਠ (Moṭh)		தட்ட பயரு/பருப்பு (Thaṭa Payaru/Paruppu)	బొబ్బర్లు (Bobbarlu)		(Matki chawal)					मोठ दाळ (Moṭh Dāḷ)
राजमा (Rājmā)	Kidney beans	Phaseolus vulgaris	ৰাজমাহ (Rājmāh)	রাজমা (Rājmā)	રાજમા (Rājmā)	ಅವರ ಕಾಳು/ರಾಜಮಾ (Abara Kāḷu/Rājma)	വൻപയർ /രജ്മ /അമര (Vanpayar/Rajma/Amara)	राजमा (Rājmā)	ରାଜମା (Rājamā)	ਰਾਜਮਾ (Rājmā)	මෑ ඇට (Mae Eṭa)	அவரை/பீன்ஸ் (Avarai/Beans)	రాజ్మా/ సీమచిక్కుడు విత్తులు/అనుములు (Rajma/ Sīmachikkuḍu Vittulu/ Anumulu)	ಅಬರೆ (Abarae)	Rajma phalli راجما		ꯀꯨꯂꯤꯍꯋꯥꯏ (Kulihawāi)	राजमा (Rājmā)	ৰাজমা (Rājmā)	राजमा (Rājmā)
उड़द (Urad)	Black Lentil (whole)/ White Lentil (dehusked)	Vigna mungo	মাটি মাহ (Māti Māh)	কলাই ডাল/ বিউলি ডাল (Kôlāi Ḍāl/ Biuli Ḍāl)	અડદ દાળ (Aḍad Dāḷ)	ಉದ್ದಿನ ಬೇಳೆ (Uddina Beḷe)	ഉഴുന്ന് (Uzhunnu)	उडीद/ उडदाची डाळ (Uḍid/ Uḍadāchi Ḍāḷ)	ବିରି ଡାଲି (Biri Ḍāli)	ਕਾਲੀ ਦਾਲ (Kāli Dāl Whole – Sābat/ Split – Dhoti)/ ਮਾੰੰਹ (Mā̃h sābut/ dhoti/ Kāle Mā̃h)	උඳු (Undhu)	உளுந்து (Uḷundhu)	మినప్పప్పు (Minappappu)/ మినుములు (Minumulu)	ಉರ್ದು ಸಾಲೈ (Urdu Sālayi)	(Ureed)	उडद डाळ (Uḍad Dāḷ)	ꯍꯋꯥꯏ ꯁꯒꯣꯜ (Hawāi Sagol)	कालो मासको दाल (Kālo Māsko Dāl)	কলাই দালি (Kalāi Dāil)	उड़द दाळ (Uḍad Daḷ)
मटर (Maṭar)	Pea	Pisum sativum	মটৰ (Môtôr)	মটর (Môṭor)	વટાણા (Vaṭāṇa)	ಬಟಾಣಿ (Baṭāṇi)	പട്ടാണി കടല (Paṭṭāṇi Kaḍala)	मटार/वाटाणे (Maṭār/ Vāṭāṇe)	ମଟର ଛୁଇଁ/ମଟର (Maṭårå Chhuĩ /Maṭårå)	ਮਟਰ (Maṭar)		பட்டாணி (Paṭṭāṇi)	బఠాణీ (Baṭāṇi)	ಬಟಾಣಿ (Baṭāṇi)	(Matar Phalli)	वाटाणे (Vātāṇe)	ꯍꯋꯥꯏ ꯊꯥꯔꯛ (Hawāi Thārak)	केराउ (Kerāu)	মটৰ (Maṭar)	वटला/मटर (Vaṭlā/Maṭar)
Hindi	English	Botanical name	Assamese	Bengali	Gujarati	Kannada	Malayalam	Marathi	Oriya	Punjabi	Sinhala	Tamil	Telugu	Tulu	Urdu	Konkani	Meitei	Nepali	Maithili	Rajasthani

== Cereals ==
Cereal names by various Indian languages
Hindi	English	Botanical name	Assamese	Bengali	Gujarati	Kannada	Malayalam	Marathi	Oriya	Punjabi	Sinhala	Tamil	Telugu	Tulu	Urdu	Konkani	Meitei	Maithili	Rajasthani
मक्कि/मकै (Makki/Makai)	Maize, Corn	Zea mays	মাকৈ (Mākoi)	ভুট্টা (Bhuṭṭā)	મકાઈ (Makāi)	ಮುಸುಕಿನ ಜೋಳ (Musukina Joḷa)	ചോളം (Choḷam)	मका (Makā)	ମକା (Måkā)	ਮੱਕਿ (Makki)	ඉරිඟු (Iringu)	மக்காசோளம் (Makka Choḷam)	మొక్కజొన్న (Mokka Jonna)	ಜೋಲ (Jōla)	(Makai)	जोळ (Joḷ)	ꯆꯨꯖꯥꯛ (Chujak)	মকৈ (Makai)	मक्को (Makko)
चावल (Chāval-uncooked rice) भात (Bhāt-cooked rice)	Rice	Oryza sativa	চাউল (Sāul) / ভাত (Bhāt)	চাল (Chāl) / ভাত (Bhāt)	ચોખા (Chokhā)/ ભાત (Bhāt)	ಅಕ್ಕಿ (Akki)/ ಅನ್ನ (Anna)	അരി (Ari)/ ചോറ് (Chor)	तांदूळ (Tā̃duḷ) / भात (Bhāt)	ଚାଉଳ (Chāuḷå) / ଭାତ (Bhātå)	ਚੋਲ (Chawl) / ()	සහල් (Sahal) / බත් (Bat)	அரிசி (Arici)/ சாதம் (Sādam)	బియ్యం (Biyyam) వడ్లు/వరి/వండిన అన్నం (Vaḍlu/Vari/Vanḍina Annam) ప్రాలు/ప్రాయి (Prālu /Prāyi)	ಅರಿ (Ari) ಅನ್ನ (Anna)	چاول (Chāval)	तांदूळ (Tā̃duḷ)/ भात (Bhāt)	ꯆꯦꯡ (Cheng)/ ꯑꯀꯪꯕꯥ ꯆꯦꯡ (Akobā Cheng)	চৌৰ (Chôr)/ ভাত (Bhāt)	चावळ/चोखा (Chawaḷ/Chokhā)/ भात (Bhāt)
गॆहुन (Gehun)	Wheat	Triticum aestivum	গম (Gôm)	গম (Gôm)	ઘઉઁ (Ghaũ)	ಗೋಧಿ (Gōdhi)	ഗോതമ്പ് (Godambu)	गहू (Gahu)	ଗହମ (Gåhåmå)	ਕਣਕ (Kaṇak)	තිරිඟු (Tiringu)	கோதுமை (Godumai)	గోధుమ (Godhuma)	ಗೋದಿ (Gōdi)	گيهو (Gehun)	गोंव (Gõv)	ꯒꯦꯍꯨ (Gehu)	গহুম (Gahum)	गऊं/गेऊं (Gaũ/Geũ)
जोव (Jow)	Barley	Hordeum vulgare	বাৰ্লি (Bārli)	যব (Jaub)	જવ (Jav)	ಬಾರ್ಲಿ/ಜವೆ (Bārli /Jave)	ബാർലി (Bārli)	जव (Jav)	ଯଉ (Jau)	ਜੋੰ (Jawn)	බාර්ලි (Bārli)	பாரலி (Bārli)	యావ (Yāva), యావ బియ్యం (Yāvaka Biyyam), జావ బియ్యం (Jāva Biyyam)	ಬಾರ್ಲಿ (Bārli)	جؤ(Jav)	वार्लि (Bārli)	ꯕꯥꯔꯂꯤ (Bārli)	()	जव/जऊं (Jav/Joũ)
जोवार (Jowār)	Sorghum bicolor		যুৱাৰ (Zuwār)	যোবওর (Jowār)	જુવાર (Juwār)	ಜೋಳ (Jōḷa)	ജേവാർ/ചോളം (Jowar/Choḷam)	ज्वारी (Jwāri)	ଜୁୟାର/ଜୁବାର (Juyāra/Jubāra)	ਜਵਾਰ (Jawār)	ඉදල් ඉරිඟු (Idal Iringu)	கருஞ்சோளம் (Karunchoḷam)	జొన్న (Jōnna)	ಜೋಲ (Jōla)	جوار (Javar)	जोळ(Joḷ)	ꯖꯣꯋꯥꯔ (Jowār)	()	जुआर (Juār)
बाजरा (Bājrā)	Pearl millet	Pennisetum glaucum	বাজৰা (Bājrā)	বাজরা (Bājrā)	બાજરી (Bājri)	ಸಜ್ಜೆ (Sajje)	കമ്പ്/കംമ്പം (Kambu/Kambam)	बाजरी (Bājri)	ବାଜରା (Bājarā)	ਬਾਜਰ (Bājar)	බජිරි (Bajiri)	கம்பு (Kambu)	సజ్జలు (Sajjalu)	ಸಜ್ಜೆ (Sajje)	باجرا (Bājra)	बाजरा (Bajra)	ꯕꯥꯖꯔꯥ (Bājrā)	বাজৰা (Bājrā)	बाजरो (Bājro)
रागि (Rāgi)	Finger millet	Eleusine coracana	মৰুৱা (Maruwā)	মারওআ (Mārwā)	નાગળી/નાચણી (Nāgḷi/Nachṇi)	ರಾಗಿ (Rāgi)	കൂരഗ്/പാഞ്ജി പുല്ലു (Kūragu/Pānji Pullu)	नाचणी/नागली (Nāchṇi/Nāgli)	ମାଣ୍ଡିଆ (Māndiā)	ਰਾਗੀ (Rāgi)	කුරක්කන් (Kurakkan)	கேழ்வரகு / கேப்பை /ஆரியம் (Kezhvaragu /Keppai /Ariyam)	చోళ్ళు/ తైడా/రాగులు (Choḷḷu/Taiḍā/Rāgulu)	ರಾಗಿ (Rāgi)	ناچني (Nachni)	नातणो/नाचणो (Natṇo/Nachaṇo)	ꯔꯥꯒꯤ (Rāgi)	মৰুআ (Maruā)	नागली (Nāgli)
कोद्रा (Kodra)	Kodo millet	Paspalum scrobiculatum	কোডো (Kodo)	কোডো (Koḍo)	કોદરી (Kodari)	ಹರಕ (Haraka)	കൂവരക് (Koovarakku)	कोदो (Kodo)	କୋଦୁଅ (Koduå)		ਕੋਦਰਾ (Kodra)	கருவரகு /வரகு (Karuvargu/Varagu)	అరికెలు (Arikelu)					()	कोदरो (Kodaro)
बर्रि (Barri)	Proso millet	Panicum miliaceum	চীনা (Sinā)	চীনা (Cheenā)	ચેનો (Cheno)	ಬರಗು (Baragu)	പനിവരക് (Panivarakku)	वरी (Vari)	ଚଣି (Chåṇi)		මෙනේරි (Meneri)	பனிவரகு (Panivaragu)	వరిగులు (Varigulu)						चेनो/बरी (Cheno/Bari)
कंगनी (Kãgni)	Foxtail millet	Setaria italica	কণী (Kôni)	কাউন (Kāun)	કાંગ (Kā̃g)	ನವಣೆ (Navaṇe)	തിന (Tina)	राळे/कांग (Rāḷe/Kā̃g)	କାଙ୍ଗୁ (Kāngu)		තනහාල් (Tanahal)	தினை (Tinai)	కొర్రలు (Kōrralu)					কাউনী (Kāuni)	कांग (Kā̃g)
झंगोरा (Jhangora)	Barnyard millet	Echinochloa	চ্যমা (Syamā)	শ্যামা (Shyāmā)	સામો (Sāmo)	ಊದಲು (Ūdalu)	കാവട പുല്ലു (Kavaḍa Pullu)	भगर (Bhagar)	ଖିରା (Khirā)			குதிரைவாலி (Kuthiraivali)	ఒడలు/కోడిసమ (Oḍalu/Kōḍisāmā)						संवो/संमो (Sãvo/Sāmo)
कुट्की (Kuṭki)	Little millet	Panicum sumatrense	চামা (Sāmā)	সামা (Sāmā)	ગાજરો (Gājro)	ಸಾಮೆ/ಸಾವೆ (Sāme/Sāve)	ചാമാ (Chāmā)	कुटकी (Kuṭki)	ସୁଆଁ (Suā̃)			சாமை அரிசி (Sāmai Arici)	సమలు (Samalu)						गजरो (Gajro)
विलायति जौन/जै (Vilāyati joun/Jai)	Oats	Avena sativa	ওট্স (Oṭs)	জঈ (Jôi)	ઓટ્સ (Oṭs)	ತೋಕೆ ಗೋಧಿ (Tōke Gōdhi)	ഓട്സ് (Oṭs)	ओट्स (Oṭs)	ଜଅ (Jå)			காடைகந்நி (Kāḍaikanni)	తోక గోధుమలు(Tōka Gōdhumalu)		جؤ (Jav)				ओट (Oṭ)
Hindi	English	Botanical name	Assamese	Bengali	Gujarati	Kannada	Malayalam	Marathi	Oriya	Punjabi	Sinhala	Tamil	Telugu	Tulu	Urdu	Konkani	Meitei	Maithili	Rajasthani

== Spices ==
Spice names by various Indian languages
Hindi	English	Botanical name	Assamese	Bengali	Gujarati	Kannada	Malayalam	Marathi	Oriya	Punjabi	Sindhi	Sinhala	Tamil	Telugu	Tulu	Urdu	Konkani	Meitei	Maithili	Rajasthani
मसाले (Masāle)	Spices		মসলাবা (Môslābā)	মসলাগুলো (Môslāgulo)	મસાલો (Masālo)	ಮಸಾಲೆಗಳು (Masalegaḷu)	സുഗന്ധവ്യഞ്ജനങ്ങൾ (Sugandhavyanjhangal)	मसाल्यां (Masālyã)	ମସଲାଗୁଡ଼ିକ (Masalāguṛika)	ਮਸਾਲਿਆਂ (Masāliã)	()	කුළුබඩු (Kundivaḍu)	வசனை (Vāsaṇai)	సుగంధ ద్రవ్యాలు (Sugandha drapyālu)	()	(Masāle)	()	()	()	मसालां (Masālãā)
अदरक (Adrak)/ आदि (Ādi)	Ginger	Zingiber officinale	আদা (Āda)	আদা (Āda)	આદુ (Ādu)	ಶುಂಠಿ (Shunṭhi)	ഇഞ്ചി (Inji)	आले/आलं (Āle/Ālã)	ଅଦା (Åda-ginger) ଶୁଖିଡ଼ା (Sukhiḍā-dried ginger)	ਅਦਰਕ (Adrak)	()	ඉඟුරු (Inguræ)	இஞ்சி (Inji)	అల్లం (Allam-ginger) శొంఠి (Sonthi-dried ginger)	(Sunti)	ادرك (Adrak)	आलें (Alen-fresh) सूट (Sūṭ-dried ginger)	ꯁꯤꯡ (Sing)		अदरख/आदो (Adrakh/Ādo)
इलायची (Ilāichi)	Cardamom	Elettaria cardamomum	ইলাচী/এলাচি (Ilasi/ Elasi)	এলাচ/এলাচি (Elach/ Elachi)	ઈલાયચી (Ilāychi)	ಏಲಕ್ಕಿ (Yelakki)	ഏലക്ക (Eelakkaaya)	वेलदोडा/वेलची (Veldoḍā/Velchi)	ଗୁଜୁରାତି/ଅଳେଇଚ (Gujurāti/Aḷeichå)	ਇਲਾਚੀ (Ilāchi)	()	එන්සාල්/කරඳමුංගු (Ensāl/Karandamungu)	ஏலக்காய் (Ēlkkāyam)	ఏలకి కాయ (Ēlaki Kāyi-unripe)/ ఏలకి పండు (Ēlaki Panḍu-ripe)/ యాలకులు/ఏలకులు (Yalukalu)	ಏಲಕ್ಕಿ (Yēlakki)	إلايچي (Ilaichi)		ꯑꯦꯂꯥꯏꯆꯤ (Elaichi)		इळायची (Iḷāyachi)
दालचीनी (Dalchini)	Cinnamon	Cinnamomum verum	দালচেনি (Dalseni)	দারচিনি (Darchini)	તજ (Taj)	ಚಕ್ಕೆ / ದಾಲ್ಚಿನಿ (Chakke / Dalchini)	കറുവപട്ട (Karuvapaṭṭa)	दालचिनी (Dālchini)	ଡାଲଚିନି (Dālåchini)	(Dalchīni)	दारचिनी (Dārchini)	කුරුඳු (Kurundu)	கருவா பட்டை (Karuvā Paṭṭai)	దాల్చిన చెక్క (Dālchini Chekka)	(Kethey)	دارچين (Darcheen)	दालचिनी (Daalchini)			तज/दाळचीणी (Taj/Dāḷchiṇi)
हल्दी (Haldi)	Turmeric	Curcuma longa	হালধি (Halodhi)	হলুদ (Holud)	હળદર (Haḷdar)	ಅರಿಶಿನ (Arishina)	മഞ്ഞള് (Manjaḷ)	हळद (Haḷad)	ହଳଦୀ (Håḷådi)	ਹਲਦੀ (Haldi)	()	කහ (Kaha)	மஞ்சள் (Manjaḷ)	పసుపు (Pasupu)	ಮಂಜೊಲ (Manjol)	هلدي (Haldi)	हळद (Haḷad)	ꯃꯆꯨ/ꯌꯥꯏꯉꯪ (Machu/Yaingam)		हरद/हळदी (Harad/Haḷadi)
धनिया (Dhaniya)	Coriander	Coriandrum sativum	ধনিয়া (Dhoniya)	ধনে (Dhone)	કોથમીર/ ધાણા (Kothmir/Dhāṇā)	ಹವೀಜ,ಕೊತ್ತಂಬರಿ ಬೀಜ (Havija/ Kotthambari Beeja)	കൊത്തമല്ലി (Kothamalli/ Malli Chappu)	धणे (Dhaṇe)	ଧନିଆ ପତ୍ର (Dhania Patra)	ਧਨਿਯਾ (Thaniya)	()	කොත්තමල්ලි (Koththamalli)	கொத்தமல்லி விதை/ மல்லி (Kottamalli Vittai/Malli)	కొత్తిమీర (Kōttimīra leaves), ధనియాలు Dhaniyālu (seeds) / కొత్తిమీర గింజలు (Kōttimīra Ginjalu - Seeds)	ಕೊತ್ತಂಬೆರಿ (Kottamberi)	(Dhanya) دهنيا	(Kanpir/Kothombar)	ꯐꯗꯤꯒꯣꯝ (Fadigom)		धांणो (Dhãāṇo)
मिर्च (Mirch)	Chili pepper-Green	Capsicum annuum	কেঁচা জলকীয়া (Kesa Zôlôkia)	কাঁচা লঙ্কা/কাঁচা মরিচ (Kãcha Lôngkā/ Kãcha Morich)	લીલા મરચા (Lilā Marchā)	ಹಸಿ ಮೆಣಸಿನಕಾಯಿ (Hasi Menasinakayi)	പച്ചമുളക് (Pacha Mulaku)	मिरची (Mirchi)	କଞ୍ଚା ଲଙ୍କା (Kånchā Lånkā)	ਮਿਰਚ (Mirach)	()	අමු මිරිස් (Amu Miris)	பச்சை மிளகாய் (Paccai Miḷakāi)	పచ్చి మిరపకాయ (Pachchi Mirapakaya)/ పచ్చిమిర్చి (Pachchimirchi)	ಕಾಯ ಮುನ್ಚಿ (Kai Munchi)	مرچي (Mirchi)		ꯃꯣꯔꯣꯛ (Morok)		लीली मिरच/लीली पितकाळी (Līlī Mirach/Līlī Pitkāḷi)
लाल मिर्च (Lal Mirch-on ripening the chili pepper becomes red)	Chili pepper-Red	Capsicum annuum	ৰঙা জলকীয়া (Rônga Zôlôkia)	শুকনো লঙ্কা/ লাল লঙ্কা/ শুকনা মরিচ/ লাল মরিচ (Shukno Lôngkā/ Lāl Lôngkā/ Shuknā Morich/ Lāl Morich)	લાલ મરચુ (Lāl Marchu)	ಒಣ ಮೆಣಸಿನಕಾಯಿ (Oṇa Meṇasinakāyi)	വറ്റല്മുളക് /ചുവന്നമുളക് (Vattal Muḷaku/ Chuvana Muḷaku)	लाल मिरची (Lāl Mirchi)	ଶୁଖିଲା ଲଙ୍କା (Sukhilā Lånkā)	(Laal Mirach)	()	රතු මිරිස් (Rutu Miris)	காய்ந்த மிளகாய் (Kayantha Miḷagāi)	ఎఱ్ఱ/ఎ౦డు మిరపకాయ (Erra/Endu; Mirapakaya-sundried)/పండుమిరపకాయ (Panḍu Mirapakaya)/ ఎండుమిర్చి (Endumirchi)	ಕೆಂಪು ಮುನ್ಚಿ (Kempu Munchi)	سرخ مرچ (Surkh Mirch)	तांब्डि मिरसंग (Tambdi Mirsang)	ꯒꯣꯜꯃꯣꯔꯣꯛ (Morok)		लाल मिरच/लाल पितकाळी (Lāl Mirach/Lāl Pitkāḷi)
हींग (Hing)	Asafoetida	Ferula assafoetida	হিং (Hing)	হিং (Hing)	હિંગ (Hing)	ಇಂಗು (Ingu)	കായം (Kaayam)	हिंग (Hinga)	ହେଙ୍ଗୁ (Hengu)	ਹੀਂਗ (Hing)	()	පෙරුම්කායම් (Perungkayang)	பெருங்காயம் (Perungkayam)	ఇంగువ (Inguva)	ಇಂಗ್ (Ing)	(Hing) هينگ	(Hing)	ꯍꯤꯡ (Hing)		हिंग (Hing)
जीरा (Jeera)	Cumin	Cuminum cyminum	জীৰা (Zira)	জিরে/জিরা (Jire/Jira)	જીરૂ (Jiru)	ಜೀರಿಗೆ (Jeerige)	ജീരകം (Jeerakam)	जिरं/जिरे (Jirã/Jire)	ଜୀରା (Jīra)	ਜੀਰਾ (Jīra)	()	සූදුරු (Suduræ)	நெற்சீரகம்/சீரகம் (Nerjiragam /Jiragam)	జీల కఱ్ఱ (Jīla Karra)	ಜೀರಿಗೆ (Jīrige)	زيرا (zeera)	जिरे (Jiren)	ꯖꯤꯔꯥ (Jira)		जीरो/जीर (Jīro/Jīr)
सौंफ (Saunf)	Fennel seed	Foeniculum vulgare		মৌরি (Mauri)	વરિયાળી (Variyali)	ಸೋಂಪು ಕಾಳು (Sompu Kaalu)		बडीशेप/बडीशोप (Baḍishep/Baḍishop)	ପାନ ମଧୁରୀ (Pana Madhuri)	ਸੋੰਫ (Saunf)	()	මාදුරු (Maduru)	சோம்பு (Sompu)	సోఁపు గింజలు (Sopu Ginjalu)			बडीशोप (Badishop)	ꯍꯣꯞ (Hop)		सूंफ (Sūnph)
कढ़ी पत्ता (Kadi Patta)	Curry leaf	Murraya koenigii	নৰসিংহ পাত (Nôrôxinghô Pat)	কারি পাতা (Kari Pata)	મીઠો લીમડો (Miṭho Limḍo)	ಕರಿಬೇವಿನ ಸೊಪ್ಪು Karibevina Soppu	കറിവേപ്പില (Karivepila/ Kariyapela)	कढीपत्ता/कढीलिंब (Kaḍhipattā/Kaḍhilimba)	ଭୃଷୁଙ୍ଗା ପତ୍ର (Bhrusunga Patra)	ਕਡੀ ਪਤ੍ਤਾ (Kadipatta)	()	කරපිංචා (Karapincha)	கறிவேப்பிலை (Karivepillai)	కరివేపాకు (Karivepaaku)	ಬೇಸೊಪ್ಪು (Besoppu)	كرهى پته (Karhi Patta)	(Beva Palo / Phanne Palo)			मीठो नींबडो (Miṭho Nīmbḍo)
काली मिर्च (Kali Mirch)	Black pepper	Piper nigrum	জালুক/গোল মৰিচ (Zaluk/ Gůl Moris)	গোল মরিচ (Gol Morich)	મરી (Mari)	ಕಾಳು ಮೆಣಸು Kaḷu Menasu	കുരുമുളക് (Kuru Muḷaku)	मिरी/काळे मिरे (Miri/Kāḷe Mire)	ଗୋଲ ମରିଚ (Gola Maricha)	ਕਾਲੀ ਮਿਰਚ (Kaali Mirch)	()	ගම්මිරිස් (Gammiris)	கருமிளகு/மிளகு (Karumiladhu/Miladhu)	మిరియము/ మిరియాలు (Miriyam/Miriyaalu-in plural)	ಯೆಡೆ ಮುನ್ಚಿ (Yeday Munchi)	سياه مرچ (Siyah Mirch)	काळे मिर्ये कण (Kaḷe Mirye Kaṇ)	ꯒꯣꯜꯃꯣꯔꯣꯛ (Golmorok)		उखणा/कौळका/मरी (Ukhṇa/Koḷkā/Mari)
कबाब चीनी (Kabab Chini)	Java pepper	Piper cubeba				(Balamenasu/ Maramenasu)	(Val Mulaku/Cavika/Cinimulaku)	(Mothi/Pimpli)	ସୁଗନ୍ଧ ମରିଚ (Sugandha Maricha/Lanka)		()	ජාවා ගම්මිරිස් (Java Gammiris)	வால்மிளகு (Valmidhu)	తోఁక మిరియాలు (Tokamiriyaalu) / చలువ మిరియాలు చలవ మిరియాలు (Chaluvamiriyaalu Chalavamiriyaalu)		(Kababchini Kankol/Sitalchini)				गंध मिरच (Gandh Mirach)
लौंग (Laung)	Clove	Syzygium aromaticum	লং (Lông)	লবঙ্গ/লং (Lôbonggo/Lông)	લવિંગ (Laving)	ಲವಂಗ (Lavanga)	കരയാമ്പൂ (Kariampoo/ Karamboo)	लवंग (Lavang)	ଲଵଙ୍ଗ (Labanga)	ਲੋੰਗ (Laung)	()	කරාබු නැටි (Karabu Neti)	கிராம்பு / இலவங்கம் (Kirambu/Ilavangam)	లవంగం (Lavangam)	ಲವಂಗ (Lavanga)	لونگ (Long)	लवंग (Lavang)	ꯂꯣꯕ (Laung)		लूंग (Lūng)
मेथी (Methi)	Fenugreek seeds	Trigonella foenum-graecum	মেথি/মিথি (Methi/Mithi)	মেথি (Methi)	મેથી (Methi)	ಮೆಂತ್ಯ (Menthya)	ഉലുവ (Uluva)	मेथ्या (Methyā)	ମେଥି (Methi)	ਮੇਥੁ (Methu)	()	උළුහාල් (Ulu Hāl)	வெந்தயம் (Vengayam)	మెంతులు (Menthulu)	ಮೆತ್ತೆಣ(Metthey)	ميتهى (Methi)	मेथी (Methi)	ꯃꯦꯊꯤ (Methi)		मेथी (Methi)
प्याज (Pyāj)	Onion/Shallot	Allium cepa	পিয়াঁজ (Piyãz)	পেঁয়াজ/পিঁয়াজ (Pẽaj/Pĩaj)	ડુંગળી/ કાંદા (Ḍungḷi/Kāndā)	ಈರುಳ್ಳಿ, ಉಳ್ಳಾಗಡ್ಡಿ (Eeruḷḷi, Uḷḷagaddi)	സവാള (Savoḷa/ Vaḷiya Uḷḷi)	कांदा (Kāndā)	ପିଆଜ/ଓଇଲ/ଉଇଲ (Piyājå/Oīlå/Uīlå)	ਪਿਯਾਜ/ਗਾਠਾ/ਗਾੰਦਾ (Pyāj/Gaṭhā/Ganhdā)	()	ලූණු (Lūnu)	வெங்காயம் (Vengkayam)	ఉల్లిపాయ /ఎఱ్ఱగడ్డ (Ullipaaya /Erragadda)	ನಿರುಲ್ಲಿ (Nirulli)	پياز (Pyaaz)	कांदो (Piyāv/Kāndo)	ꯇꯤꯜꯍꯧ (Tilahou)		कांदो (Kāndo)
लहसुन (Lehsun)	Garlic	Allium sativum	নহৰু/ৰচুন (Nôhôru/Rosun)	রসুন (Roshun)	લસણ (Lasaṇ)	ಬೆಳ್ಳುಳ್ಳಿ (Beḷḷuḷḷi)	വെളുത്തുള്ളി (Veḷuthuḷḷi/ Veḷḷuḷḷi)	लसूण (Lasuṇ)	ରସୁଣ (Rasuṇa)	ਲਸਨ (Lasan)	()	සුදු ළුණු (Sudu Lūnu)	வெள்ளை பூண்டு (Vellai Punḍu)	వెల్లుల్లి (Vellulli/ Chinna Ullipaya)	(Bollulli)	لهسن (Lehsan)	लोसण (Losuṇ)	ꯆꯅꯝ (Chanam)		लसण (Lasaṇ)
सरसों (Sarson)	Mustard seed	Brassica		সর্ষে বীজ (Sorshe Bīj)	રાઈ (Rāi)	ಸಾಸಿವೆ (Sasive)		मोहरी (Mohari)	ସୋରିଷ ମଞ୍ଜି (Soriså Manji)	ਸਰਸੋੰ (Sarson)	()	අබ (Aba)	கடுகு (Kaṭidu)	ఆవాలు, ఆవ గింజలు (Āvalu/Āva Ginjalu)	ಸಾಸೆಮಿ (Sāsemi)		सासम (Sasam)	ꯍꯪꯒꯥꯝ (Hangām)		सरसूं (Sarsun)
जायफल (Jāiphal)	Nutmeg	Myristica		জায়ফল (Jāyphol)	જાયફળ (Jayphal)	ಜಾಯಿಕಾಯಿ (Jāyikayi)		जायफळ (Jāyphaḷ)	ଜାଇଫଳ (Jāiphaḷa)	ਜਾਯਫਲ (Jāiphal)	()	සාදික්කා (Sādikka)	ஜாதிக்காய் (Jātikkai)	జాజికాయ (Jāyijekaya)			जायफळ (Jāyphaḷ)	ꯖꯥꯏꯐꯜ (Jaifal)		जायफळ (Jāiphaḷ)
जावित्री (Javitri/Jayitri)	Mace	Myristica		জৈত্রী (Joitri)	જાવંત્રી (Javantri)			जायपत्री (Jāypatri)	ଜାଇତ୍ରି (Jaitri/Jai Patra)		()	වසාවාසි (Vasāvāsi)		జాజీ కాయ పై తొక్క పొట్టు లేదా పెంకు or జాపత్రి(Jaapatri)						जांवत्री/जायपत्री (Jãāvatri/Jāypatri)
चक्रफूल (Chakraphool)	Star anise	Illicium verum			બાદિયા (Ādia)	ಚಕ್ರ ಮೊಗ್ಗು (Chakramoggu)	(Takkolam)	चक्रफूल (Chakraphul)	(Anasphul)				அன்னாசி பூ (Annasi poo)	అనాస పువ్వు (Anaasa Puvvu)		(Badyani)				चक्रफूळ (Chakraphūḷ)
पत्थर फूल/दगडफूल (Patthar phool /Dagadphool)	Black stone flower	Parmotrema perlatum				ಕಲ್ಲುಹೂವು (Kallu Hoovu)		दगडफूल (Dagaḍphul)					கல்பாசி ()	బండపువ్వు (Banda puvvu) రాతిపువ్వు (Raati puvvu)						दगडफूळ (Dagaḍphuḷ)
	(Gamboge)	Garcinia gummi-gutta					(Kudam Puli)	जुंबोगे (Jumboge)				ගොරකා (Goraka)								गेंबोज (Gemboj)
Hindi	English	Botanical name	Assamese	Bengali	Gujarati	Kannada	Malayalam	Marathi	Oriya	Punjabi	Sindhi	Sinhala	Tamil	Telugu	Tulu	Urdu	Konkani	Meitei	Maithili	Rajasthani

== Cucumbers, gourds, and squashes ==
Cucumber, gourd, and squash names by various Indian languages
Hindi	English	Botanical name	Assamese	Bengali	Gujarati	Kannada	Malayalam	Marathi	Oriya	Punjabi	Sinhala	Tamil	Telugu	Tulu	Urdu	Konkani	Meitei	Maithili	Rajasthani
चौ-चौ/चो-चो (Chow-chow/Cho-cho)	Chayote	Sicyos edulis	এচকুস (Eskus)	চো চো/স্ক্বাশ (Cho cho/Squash)	ચાઓ ચાઓ (Chowchow)	ಸೀಮೆ ಬದನೇಕಾಯಿ (Seemay Badanekāyi)	ചൗ ചൗ (Chow Chow)	चिव चिव (Chiv Chiv)	ଖେମଣା /ଚାଉଚାଉ (Khemaṇa/Chauchau)	ਚੋ ਚੋ (Chocho)	චවු චවු (Chow chow)	பெங்களூர் கத்தரிக்காய்/சொ சொ (Vengaḷur Katthirikāi /Chow Chow)	సీమ/బె౦గుళూరు వ౦కాయ (Seema/ Bengaḷuru Vankāya)			विलायती वायंगें (Vilāyati Vāyange)	ꯑꯦꯁꯀꯨꯁ /ꯆꯣ ꯆꯣ (Eskus/Cho-cho)	()	चाव-चाव (Chāv Chāv)
गिल्का/गिल्की (Gilka/Gilki) नेनुआ (Nenua)	Silk Squash/ Sponge Gourd /Egyptian Luffa	Luffa egyptiaca	জিকা (Jika/Zika)	ধুঁধুল (Dhundhul)	Galka (ગલકા)	ನಾಟಿ/ತುಪ್ಪೆದ ಹೀರೇಕಾಯಿ (Nāti/Tuppeda Hīrekāyi)	ഏണില്ല പീച്ചിങ്ങ (Ēṇilla Peechinga)	गिलके/घोसाळे (Gilke/Ghosāḷe)	ତରଡ଼ା (Taraṛa)	ਰਾਮ ਤੋਰੀ (Rām Tori)		நுரை பீர்க்கங்காய் (Nurai Peerkangai)	నేతి బీరకాయ (Naethi Beerakaya)	ಪೀರೆ (Pīre)	گهو سا لا/ترئ	घोसाळें (Ghosāḷen)	ꯁꯦꯕꯣꯠ ꯍꯦꯛꯄꯥ (Sebot Hekpa)	()	गिलकी (Gilki)
कद्दू (Kaddu)/ कोंहड़ा (Konhada)	Pumpkin	Cucurbita pepo	ৰঙা লাউ (Rônga Lau)	Kumṛo/ Kumṛa (কুমড়ো/কুমড়া)	કોળુ/કોળા (Koḷu/Koḷa)	ಸಿಹಿ/ಸೀಕುಂಬಳ ಕಾಯಿ (Seehi/Seekumbaḷa Kāyi)	മത്തങ്ങാ (Maththanga)	लाल भोपळा (Lāl Bhopḷā)	କଖାରୁ/ବୋଇତି କଖାରୁ (Kakharu/ Boiti Kakharu)	ਹਲਵਾ ਕੱਦੂ (Halwa Kaddu)	වට්ටක්කා (Waṭṭakka)	பரங்கிக்காய் (Parangikkai)	గుమ్మడి కాయ (Gummaḍi Kaya)	ಕಾಚಿ ಕುಂಬುಡಾ/ ಕಾಚಿ ಕೆಂಬುಡೆ (Kāchi Kumbuḍā / Kāchi Kembuḍe)	كالا كدؤ	कुंवाळो (Kunvaḷo)	ꯃꯥꯏꯔꯦꯟ (Mairen)	कदीमा/কদীমা (Kadeemā)	कुम्हडो/कोळो (Kumhḍo/Koḷo)
करेला (Karela)	Bitter gourd	Momordica charantia	তিতা কেৰেলা (Tita Kêrêla)	করলা/উচ্ছে (Kôrola/Uchchhe)	કારેલા (Kārela)	ಹಾಗಲ ಕಾಯಿ (Hagala Kāyi)	കയ്പക്ക/പാവയ്ക (Kaipakka/ Pāvakka)	कारले (Kārle)	କଲରା/ପିତଡ଼ା/ପିତା ଲାଉ (Kalara/Pitaṛa/Pitā Lāu)	ਕਰੇਲਾ (Karela)	කරවිල (Karawila)	பாகற்காய் (Pavai Kāi/ Pāharkai)	కాకర కాయ (Kakara Kāya)	ಕಂಚಲ (Kanchala)	كريلا	कारातें (Karethen)	ꯀꯔꯣꯠ ꯑꯈꯥꯕꯤ (Karot Akhabi)	()	करेलो (Karelo)
खेेक्सा/काकरोल/काकोरा (Kheksā/Kakrol/Kakorā)	Teasle gourd	Momordica subangulata	ভাত কেৰেলা (Bhat Kêrêlā)	কাঁটোলা/কাকরোল (Kantolā/Kakrol)	કાંકડ઼ (Kankoḍ)	ಮೊದಗಲಕಾಯಿ (Modhagalkāyi)		कार्टुले (Kārṭule)	କାଙ୍କଡ଼ (Kānkaṛa)		තුඹ කරවිල (Thumba Karawila)	மெலுகு பாகால/ பாலு பாக்கல/ பலுவக்காய (Melugu Pākal / Pālu Pākal / Paluvakkāi)	అడవి కాకరకాయ (Aḍavikākara/Ākākarakāya)			पगिला (Pagilā)	ꯀꯔꯣꯠ ꯀꯪꯘꯧ (Karot Kanghou)	()	कंकेड़ो/कांकोड़ो (Kankeṛo/Kankoṛo)
खीरा (Khīrā)	Cucumber	Cucumis sp.	তিয়ঁহ (Tiyôh)	শশা (Shôshā)	કાકડ઼ી (Kākṛi)	ಸೌತೇಕಾಯಿ (Savthekāyi)	വെള്ളരിക്ക (Veḷḷarikka)	काकडी/तवसे (Kākḍi/Tavase)	କାକୁଡ଼ି (Kakuṛi)	ਖੀਰਾ (Khīra)	පිපිඥ්ඥා (Pipigngna)	கீரைக்காய/வெள்ளரிக்காய (Kīrai Kai/Veḷḷari Kāi)	దోసకాయ (Dosakāya)	ತೆಕ್ಕರೆ/ ತೌತೆ (Tekkarè/Touté -the yellow cucumber)	(Khīra) ككرى / كهيرا	तवशें (Tovshen)	ꯊꯕꯤ (Thabi)	()	खीरो (Khīro)
ककडी (Kakadi)	Armenian cucumber	Cucumis sativus							ଛଚିନ୍ଦ୍ରା (Chhachindra)	Kakdi	ඇමෙරිකන් පතෝල American Pathola	a kind of long-vellarikai	a kind of long-keerakai						काकड़ी (Kākṛi)
लौकी (Lauki)/ लौव्वा (Lauwā)/ दुधी (Dudhi)/ घिया (Ghiyā)	Bottle Gourd/ Calabash	Lagenaria vulgaris	জাতি লাউ (Jāti Lāu)	লাউ (Lāu)	દુધી (Dudhi)	ಸೋರೆ ಕಾಯಿ/ ಚುರಕ್ಕಾಯಿ (Sōre Kāyi/ Churakkāi)	ചുരയ്ക (Churaykka)	दुधी भोपळा (Dudhi Bhopḷā)	ଗୋଟା ନାଉ (Goṭa Nāu)	Louki/Ghiya (ਲੋਕੀ/ਘਿਯਾ)	දිය ලබු (Dhiya labu)	சுரைக்காய்/சுரக்காய் (Surai Kāi/ Surakkāi)	సొరకాయ/ఆనపకాయ (Sorakāya/Ānapakāya)	ತುರೆ (Turè)	سفيد كدو	दुधे (Dudhe)	ꯈꯣꯡꯗꯔꯨꯝ (Khongdrum)	सजमैं/সজমৈঁ (Sajmain)	आळ/घियो (Āḷ/Ghiyo)
तोरई (Torai)/ तुरई (Turai)/ तोरी (Tori)	Ridge gourd/ Chinese Okra / Ridged Luffa	Luffa acutangula	ভোল (Bhůl)	ঝিঙ্গে/ঝিঙ্গা (Jhinge/ Jhinga)	તુરીયા/ઘિસોડા (Turiya/Ghisoḍā)	ಹೀರೆ ಕಾಯಿ (Hīray Kāyi)	Peechchinga (പീച്ചിങ്ങ)	दोडका/शिराळे (Doḍkā/Shirāḷe)	ଜହ୍ନି (Janhi)	ਤੋਰੀ (Tori)	දාර වැටකොලු/වටකොල (Weṭakolu/Waṭakola)	பீர்க்கங்காய் (Peerkan kāi/Peerangāi)	బీరకాయ (Beera Kāya)	ಪೀರೆ (Pīrè)	ترئ (Turai)	घोसाळें (Ghosāḷen)	ꯁꯦꯕꯣꯠ (Sebot)	()	तोरू (Torū)
चिचिंढा (Chichindhā)/ चिचिंगा (Chichingā)/ पडवल (Padwal)	Snake Gourd	Trichosanthes cucumerina	ধুন্দুলি (Dhunduli)	চিচিঙ্গে/চিচিঙ্গা (Chichinge/Chichingā)	પંડોળા/પડાવળી (Pandoḷā/Padavaḷi)	ಪಡವಲ ಕಾಯಿ (Padavala Kāyi)	പടവലങ്ങ (Padavalanga)	पडवळ (Paḍvaḷ)	ଛଚିନ୍ଦ୍ରା (Chachindrā)	ਗਲਾਰਤੋਰੀ(Galartori)	පතෝල (Pathola)	புடலங்காய் (Padavalangāi/ Pudalankāi)	పొట్లకాయ (Potlakāya / Lingapotla)	ಪಡ್ಲಂಗಾ/ಪಟ್ಲು ಕೊದು (Padlangā /Paṭlu Kodu)	پرول (Parwal)	पोडवोळें (Poḍvoḷen)	ꯂꯤꯟ ꯃꯥꯅꯕꯤ (Lin Manbi)	()	पंडोळो/चिचड़ो (Pandoḷo/Chichṛo)
परवल (Parwal)/ परोरा (Parorā)/ पटल (Paṭal)	Pointed gourd	Trichosanthes dioica	পটল (Pôtôl)	পটল (Pôṭol)	(Parval)	ಮರ ತೊಂಡೆ (Mara Thonḍe)		परवर (Parwar)	କଟକି ଛୁଇଁ/ପୋଟଳ (Potaḷa /Kaṭaki Chhuin)	ਪਰਵਲ (Parwal)		பரவலக்காய (Parvalakkāi)	బుడ౦ దోసకాయ (Buḍam Dosakāya)				ꯄꯣꯇꯣꯟ (Poton)	परोर/পৰোৰ (Paror)	परवळ (Parvaḷ)
पेठा (Peṭhā)/ कुम्हड़ा (Kumhaṛā)/ रखसाहवा कोम्हड़ा (Raksāhwā Komhaṛā)	Ash gourd	Benincasa hispida	কোমোৰা (Kůmůra)	চাল কুমড়ো/চাল কুমড়া (Chāl Kumṛo/ Chāl Kumṛa)	સફેદ કોળુ (Safed Koḷu)	ಬೂದುಕುಂಬಳ ಕಾಯಿ (Kumbaḷa Kāyi / Boodugumbaḷa Kāyi)	കുമ്പളങ്ങ (Kumbaḷanga)	कोहळा (Kohḷā)	ପାଣି କଖାରୁ (Paṇi Kakhāru)	ਚਿੱਟਾ ਪੇਠਾ (Chiṭṭa Peṭha)	පුහුල් (Puhul)	நீர் பூசணி (Neer Poosaṇikāi)	బూడిద గుమ్మడి కాయ (Booḍidha Gummaḍi Kāya)	ಕರಕುಂಬುಡಾ/ಕರಕೆಂಬುಡೆ (Karkumbuḍā /Karkembuḍe)		(Peṭha)	ꯇꯣꯔꯣꯕꯣꯠ (Torobot)		पेठो (Peṭho)
टिंडा (Ṭindā)/ दिलपसन्द (Dilpasand)	Apple gourd/ Indian round gourd	Praecitrullus fistulosus/ Citrullus fistulosus	()	টেঁসি (Ṭensi)		ಆಪಲ್ ಸೋರೆ/ (Apal Sōre)		ढेमसे (Ḍhemse)		ਟਿੰਡਾ/ਟਿੰਡੋ (Ṭinḍa/Ṭinḍo)		கோவக்காய் (Kovaikkāi)	దొండ కాయ (Donḍa Kāyi)		(Tinda)/دل پسند /(Dilpasand)				टिंडसी (Ṭinḍsī)
कुंदरू (Kundru)/ कोंडुरी (Konḍuri)/ टिंडोरा (Ṭinḍorā)/ (Bimba)	Ivy gourd/ Gentlemen's toes/ Little gourd	Coccinia grandis	কুন্দুলি (Kunduli)	কুঁদরি (Kundri)	ટિંડોલા/ગિલોરા (Ṭinḍolā/Gilorā)	ಕಾಗೆತೊಂಡೆ/ತೀಕ್ಕುದುರು/ತೊಂಡೆ ಕಾಯಿ (Kāgethonḍe / Theekkuduru / Tonḍe Kāyi)	കോവയ്ക (Kovakāi/Koval)	तोंडली (Tonḍli)	କୁନ୍ଦୁରି (Kunduri)	ਟੇੰਡਲੀ (Ṭenḍli)		கோவக்காய் (Kovakkai/ Kotturukanni/ Naripputu/ Vimpa)	దొ౦డకాయ / కాకి దొండకాయ (Donḍa Káya/Kaki Donḍakāya)	ಮನೊಲಿ (Manoli)	(Tindli)	तेंडलीं (Tenḍlin)	()		टिंडोळो (Ṭinḍoḷo)
Hindi	English	Botanical name	Assamese	Bengali	Gujarati	Kannada	Malayalam	Marathi	Oriya	Punjabi	Sinhala	Tamil	Telugu	Tulu	Urdu	Konkani	Meitei	Maithili	Rajasthani

== Leaf vegetables ==
Leaf vegetable names by various Indian languages
Hindi	English	Botanical name	Assamese	Bengali	Gujarati	Kannada	Malayalam	Marathi	Odia	Punjabi	Sinhala	Tamil	Telugu	Tulu	Urdu	Konkani	Meitei	Nepali	Maithili	Rajasthani
सब्जीयां (Sabjiyā̃)	Vegetables		শাক পাচলী (Xāk Pāsli)	শাক সবজী (Shāk Sobji)	શાકભાજી (Shākbhājī)	ತರಕಾರಿಗಳು (Tarakārigaḷu)	പച്ചക്കറികൾ (Pacchakkarikan)	भाज्या (Bhājyā)	ପନିପରିବା (Paniparibā)	ਸਬਜੀਆਂ (Sabjiā̃)	එළවළු (Elawalu)	காய்கறிகள் (Kāikarikaḷ)	కూరగాయలు (Kūragāyalu)	ಕಯ್ ಕಾಜಿಪುಲು (Kāy Kajipulu)	(Sabjiyā̃)	भाज्यो (Bhājyo)	ꯍꯤꯟꯖꯥꯡ ꯅꯥꯄꯤ (Hinjāng Nāpi)	तरकारीहरू (Tarkāriharū)	তিমনআৰু (Timanāru)	भाज्यां/भाजीयां/साग (Bhajyā̃/Bhajiyā̃/Sāg)
आम का पत्ता (Ām kā Pattā)	Mango tender leaf shoots	Mangifera indica	আম পাত (Ām P10āt)	আম পাতা (Ām Pātā)	કેરી ના પાન (Keri nā Pān)	ಮಾವಿನ ಎಲೆ (Māvina Ile)	മാങ്ങയില (Mānga Ila)	आंब्याचे पान (Ãmbyāche Pān)	ଆମ୍ବ ପତ୍ର (Āmbå Påtrå)	ਅੰਬ ਦਾ ਪੱਤਾ (Amb dā Pattā)	අඹ දළු (Amba Dalu)	மாவிலை (Māvi Ilai/Māvillai)	మావిచిగురు ఆకు (Māvi Chiguru Āku)	ಕುಕ್ಕುದ ಎರೆ (Kukkuda Ire)	(Am ka Patta)	आंब्या पालो/पानां (Āmbyā Pālo/Pānā̃)	ꯑꯥꯃꯒꯤ ꯄꯥꯝꯕꯤ (Heinou Pāmbi)	आंप को पात (Anp ko Pāt)	পল্লব/আমঽক পাত (Pôllôb/Āmôk Pāt)	आंबा रा पान (Ãmbā rā Pān)
अरबी का साग (Arbi kā Sāg)	Colocasia leaves	Colocasia esculenta	কচু শাক (Kôsu Xāk)	মুখি শাক (Mukhi Shāk)	અળવી ના પાન/અડવી ના પાન (Aḷvi nā Pān/Aḍvi nā Pān)	ಸಾವೆ ಸೊಪ್ಪು/ ಕೆಸುವಿನ ಸೊಪ್ಪು/ ಪತ್ರೊಡೆ ಎಲೆ (Sāve Soppu/ Kesuvina Soppu /Patroḍe Ile)	ചേമ്പിൻ എല/ചേമ്പില (Chembinde Ila/Chembila)	अळूचे पान (Aḷuche Pān)	ସାରୁ ପତ୍ର (Sāru Påtrå)	ਅਰਬੀ ਦਾ ਸਾਗ (Arbi dā Sāg)	හබරළ කොල (Habarala Kola)	சேப்பங்கிழங்கு இலை (Sevangkizhangu Ilai)	చేమ ఆకు (Chēma Āku)	ತೆವುದ ಎರೆ (Tevuda Ire)	(Arbi kā Sāg)	अळू पालो/ पोत्रडे पानां (Āḷu Palo/ Potrade Panā̃)	ꯄꯥꯡꯈꯣꯛꯂꯥ (Pāngkhoklā)	कर्कल को पात (Karkal ko Pāt)	অৰিকঁচনকেৰ সাগ/কঁচকেৰ সাগ (Arikõchôn ker Sāg/Kõch ker Sāg)	अरवी/पिण्डाळू रा पान (Arvi/Pinḍaḷu rā Pān)
बांस का पत्ता/ बांस का कोपला (Bā̃s kā Pattā/ Bā̃s kā Koplā)	Bamboo shoot		বাঁহ গাজৰ/বাঁহ গজালী (Bā̃x Gājar/ Bā̃x Gajāli)	বাঁশ কোড়ল (Bā̃sh Koṛal)	વાંસ અંકુર (Vā̃s Ãkur)	ಬಿದುರಿನ ಚಿಗುರು (Bidurina Chiguru)	മുളംകൂമ്പ് (Muḷamkoombu)	बांबूचे कोंब (Bā̃mbuche Kõmb)	ବାଉଁଶ କରୁଡ଼ି /ବାଉଁଶ କତୁରି (Bāũså Kåruṛi/ Bāũså Kåturi)	ਬਾਂਸ ਦਾ ਤਣਾ (Bā̃ns dā Taṇā)	උන දළු (Una Dalu)	மூங்கில் குருத்து (Mūngil Kuruttu)	వెదురు చిగురు ఆకు (Veduru Chiguru Āku)	ಕಣಿಲೆ (Kaṇile)	(Bãns ka Pattā)	बांबूच्या अंकुर (Bā̃mbuchyā Ãkur)	ꯎꯁꯣꯏ ꯃꯉꯒꯥꯟ (Ushoi Mangān-Fresh Bamboo Shoot), ꯎꯁꯣꯏ ꯁꯣꯏꯕꯨꯝ (Ushoi Soibum-Fermented Bamboo Shoots)	तामा (Tāmā), टुसा (Ṭusā-Wild Bamboo Shoot)	বাঁশঽক কোপৰ (Bā̃sôk Kopar)	बांस री कूंपळ (Bā̃s rī Kũmpaḷ)
चौराई (Chaurāi)	Green Amaranth	Amaranthus tritis	মৰীচা (Morisā)	নটে শাক (Noṭe Shāk)	તાંદળજો (Tāndaḷjo)	ದಂಟಿನ ಸೊಪ್ಪು/ರಾಜಗಿರಿ (Dhanṭina Soppu / Rājgiri)	പച്ച ചീര (Pachcha Chīra)	राजगिरा/तांदुळजा (Rājgirā/Tānduḷjā)	ଖଡ଼ା ଶାଗ (Khåṛā Sāgå)	ਚੋਲੈ ਪਾਲਕ ਦਾ ਸਾਗ (Chawlāi Pālak dā Sāg)	කූර තම්පලා (Kūra Tamipalā)	பருப்பு கீரை (Paruppu Kīrai)	తోటకూర (Toṭakūra)	ಪದ್ಪೆ (Padpè)	(Sabz Chaulai Sāg)	पाचवीं राजगिरीच्या पानां (Pachvĩ Rājgirichyā Pānā̃)	ꯆꯦꯡꯔꯨꯛ (Chengruk)	लट्टे को साग (Laṭṭe ko Sāg)	লালকা সাগ (Lālkā Sāg)	राजगिरा रा पान (Rājgirā rā Pān)
धनिया पत्ता (Dhaniyā Pattā)	Coriander leaves	Coriandrum sativum	ধনিয়া পাত (Dhaniyā Pāt)	ধনে পাতা (Dhone Pātā)	કોથમીર/ધાણા ની પાન (Kothmir/Dhāṇā ni Pān)	ಕೊತ್ತಂಬರಿ ಸೊಪ್ಪು (Kētambari Soppu)	മല്ലിയില (Malli Ila)	कोथिंबीर (Kothimbir)	ଧନିଆ ପତ୍ର (Dhaniā Påtrå)	ਧਨਿਯਾ ਦਾ ਪੱਤਾ (Thaniyā dā Pattā)	කොත්තමල්ලි කොල (Kōttamalli Kola)	கொத்தமல்லி (Kōtta Malli)	కొత్తిమీర ఆకు (Kōttimīra Āku)	ಕೊತ್ತಂಬರಿ ತೊಪ್ಪು (Kōtambari Toppu)	(Dhaniyā Pattā)	कोथमिरेचीं पानां (Kothmirechĩ Pānā̃)	ꯐꯗꯤꯒꯣꯝ (Fadigom)	धनिया को पात (Dhaniyā ko Pāt)	ধন্নি পাত (Dhônni Pāt)	धांणा रा पान (Dhā̃ṇā rā Pān)
सरगवा पत्ता (Saragawā Pattā)	Drumstick leaves	Moringa oleifera	চজিনা শাক (Sojinā Hāk)	সজনে শাক (Sojne Shāk)	સરગવો ની પાન (Sargavo ni Pān)	ನುಗ್ಗೆ ಸೊಪ್ಪು (Nuggi Soppu)	മുരിങ്ങയില (Muringa Ila)	शेवग्याचा पाला (Shevgyāchā Pālā)	ବାରମାସିଆ/ମୁଙ୍ଗ/ସଜନା ଶାଗ (Bāråmāsiyā/Mungå/Såjånā Sāgå)	ਸਹਜਣਾ ਦਾ ਪੱਤਾ (Sahajaṇā dā Pattā)	මුරුංගා කොල (Murængā Kola)	முருங்கை கீரை (Murungai Kīrai)	మునగాకు/ములగ ఆకు (Munagāku / Mulaga Āku)	ನುರ್ಗೆ ತೊಪ್ಪು (Nurge Thoppu)	(Sajnā/Saragawa kā pattā)	मोसका पालो (Moskā Pālo)	ꯁꯖꯅꯥ ꯄꯥꯝꯕꯤ (Sajanā Pambi)	सजिवन को पात (Sajivan ko Pāt)	মুইঁগা পাত/মুঙ্গ পাত (Muĩgā Pāt/Mungā Pāt)	सहजन रा पान (Sahjan rā Pān)
इमली का पत्ता (Imli kā Pattā)	Tamarind tender leaf shoots	Tamarindus indica romanized Tamar Hind	তেতেলি পাত (Teteli Pāt)	তেঁতুল পাতা (Tẽtul Pātā)	આંબલી ના પાન (Āmbli nā Pān)	ಹುಣಸೆ ಚಿಗುರು (Huṇase Chiguru)	പുളിയില (Puḷiyila/ Puḷi Ila)	चिंचेचे पान (Chĩcheche Pān)	କଇଁଆ ପତ୍ର/ତେନ୍ତୁଳି ପତ୍ର (Kåĩā Påtrå/Tentuḷi Påtrå)	ਇਮਲੀ ਦਾ ਪੱਤਾ (Imli dā Pattā)	සියඹලා දළු (Siyambalā Dalu)	புளிய இலை (Puḷiya Illāi)	చింత చిగురు అకు (Chinta Chiguru Āku)	ಪುಲಿತ ಎರೆ (Pulitha Ire)	(Imli kā Pattā)	तांबड्याचें पान (Tā̃mbaḍyāche Pān)	ꯃꯉꯒꯥꯟ (Manghan)	तित्री को पात (Titri ko Pāt)	তত্তৈৰ পাত (Tôttæir Pāt)	आमली रा पान (Āmli rā Pān)
पटसन का पत्ता (Paṭsan kā Pattā)	Jute leaves	Chorporus capsulerus	মৰাপাত শাক (Môrāpāt Xāk)	পাট শাক (Pāṭ Shāk)	શણ ના પાન (Shaṇ nā Pān)	ಸೆಣಬಿನ/ಸಣಬು ಎಲೆ (Saṇabina/Saṇabu Ile)	ചണ ഇല (Chaṇa Ila)	तागाचे पान (Tāgāche Pān)	ନଳିତା ଶାଗ/ଶଣ ସାଗ (Nåḷitā Sāgå/Såṇå Sāgå)	ਕਪਾਹ ਦਾ ਪੱਤਾ (Kapāh dā Pattā)	හණ කොල (Haṇa Kola)	சணல் இலை (Chaṇal Illai/Chaṇallai)	జనప ఆకు (Janapa Āku)	()	(Patsan kā Pattā)	तागाचें पान (Tāgachẽ Pān)	ꯑꯅꯥꯅꯕ/ꯂꯤꯃꯣꯟ ꯄꯥꯝꯕꯤ (Ananba/Limon Pambi)	()	সোনক পাত (Sonak Pāt)	सण रा पान (Saṇ rā Pān)
खट्टी पालक (Khaṭṭi Pālak)	Green Sorrel	Rumex vesicarius	টেঙেচি/চেঙা টেঙা (Tengesi/Sengā Tengā)	আমরুলি শাক/চাঙ্গেরি (Āmruli Shak/Chāngeri)	()	ಚುಕ್ಕೆ ಸೊಪ್ಪು (Chukka Soppu)	Puḷiveṇda (പുളിവെണ്ട)	आंबट चुका (Āmbaṭ Chukā)	ଆମ୍ବିଳିଆ ସାଗ (Āmbiḷiyā Sāga)	ਖੱਟੀ ਪਾਲਕ (Khaṭṭi Pālak)	()	சுக்கன் கீரை (Chukkan Keerai)	చుక్కకూర (Chukka Koora)	()	(Khaṭṭi Pālak)	()	ꯁꯧꯒꯔꯤ (Sougari)	()	পালঙ্কি সাগ (Pālônki Sāg)	खाटो पाळग (Khāṭo Paḷag)
लाल चौराई (Lāl Chaurai)	Red amaranth	Amaranthus cruentus	ৰঙা মৰীচা (Rôngā Morisā)	লাল শাক (Lāl Shāk)		ಕೆಂಪು ದಂಟಿನ ಸೊಪ್ಪು (Kempu Danṭina Soppu)	ചുവപ്പ് ചീര (Chuvana Chīra)	लाल माठ (Lāl Māṭh)	କୋଶିଳା ଶାଗ/ନାଲିଆ ଖଡ଼ାଶାଗ (Kosiḷā Sāgå/Nāliyā Khåṛā Sāgå)	ਲਾਲ ਚੋਲਾਈ ਦੀ ਸਾਗ (Lāl Chawlāi di Sāg)	රතු තම්පලා (Ratu Tamipalā)	சிவப்பு முளைக்கீரை/புங்கீராய் (Sivappu Muḷai Kīrai/Punkīrai)	కొయ్య తోటకూర (Kōyya Toṭakūra)	ಪದ್ಪೆ (Padpe)	(Surkh Chaulai Sāg)	तांबडी राजगिरीच्या पानां (Tā̃bdi Rājgirichyā Pānā̃)	()	रातो लट्टे को साग (Rāto Laṭṭe ko Sāg)	লালকা সাগ (Lālkā Sāg)	लाल राजगिरा रा पान (Lāl Rājgirā rā Pān)
लूनिया साग (Luniā Sāg)	Purslane	Portulaca oleracea		নূনিয়া শাক (Nuniyā Shāk)	લૂણી ની પાન (Luṇi ni Pān)	ಗೋಳಿ ಸೊಪ್ಪು (Gēḷi Soppu)	കൊലുപ്പ (Koluppa)	घोळ (Ghoḷ)	କଲମା ଶାଗ (Kålåmā Sāgå)			பருப்புக்கீரை (Paruppu Keerai)	పాయల కూర (Gangapāyala/Pāyala Kūra)/పెద్దపాయల (Peddapaayala) /పెద్దపావిల (Peddapāvila Kūra) /పాప్పు కూర (Pāppu Kūra)						নোনি সাগ (Noni Sāg)	लूणिया रा पान (Lūṇiā rā Pān)
मेष्टा (Meshṭā) पितवा (Pitwā)	Indian roselle/ Kenaf	Hibiscus cannabinus, Hibiscus Sabdariffa	চুকা শাক/ টেঙ্গামৰা (Sukā Xāk/ Têngāmôrā)	চুকা পালঙ্গ শাক (Chukā Pālong Shāk) মেষ্টাপাত (Meshṭā Pāt)		ಪುಂಡಿ ಪಲ್ಲೆ (Punḍi Pulle)	മതിപുളി (Matipuḷi)	अंबाडी (Ambāḍi)	ଖତଶାଗ (Khåtå Sāgå)	Kanuria, Nalita saga		புளி கீரை	గోంగూర (Gōngūra) /పుంటికూర (Punṭi Kūra) ()						মিৰচৈয়া সাগ (Mirchôiyā Sāg)	अंबाडी (Ãmbāḍi )
मेथी (Methi)	Fenugreek	Trigonella Foenum	মেথি শাক (Methi Xāk)	মেথি শাক (Methi Shāk)	મેથી ની ભાજી (Methi ni Bhāji)	ಮೆಂತ್ಯ ಸೊಪ್ಪು (Menthyā Soppu)	ഉലുവചീര (Uluva Chīra, Menthya)	मेथी (Methi)	ମେଥି ଶାଗ (Methi Sāgå)	ਮੇਥੀ (Methi)	උළුහාල් කොල (Uluhāl Kola)	வெந்தய கீரை (Vengtaya Kīrai)	మెంతి కూర (Menti Kūra)	ಮೆತ್ತೆ (Mettè)	ميتهي (Methi)	मेथी (Methi)			মেথি সাগ (Methi Sāg)	मेथी रा पान (Methi rā Pān)
मूली का पत्ता (Mooli kā Pattā)	Radish leaves	Raphanus sativus	মূলা শাক (Mulā Xāk)	মূলো শাক (Mulo Shāk)	મુલો શાક (Mulo Shāk)	ಮೂಲಂಗಿ ಸೊಪ್ಪು (Mūlangi Soppu)	മുള്ളങ്കി ചീര (Muḷḷangi Chīra)	मुळ्याचा पाला (Muḷyāchā Pālā)	ମୂଳାଶାଗ (Muḷā Sāga)		රාබු කොල (Rabu Kola)	முள்ளங்கி கீரை (Muḷḷangi Kīrai)	ముల్లంగి ఆకు (Mullangi Āku)						মুৰৈ সাগ/মুৰৈ সাগ (Muræ Sāg/Murôi Sāg)	मूळी रा पान (Muḷi rā Pān)
पालक (Pālak)	Spinach	Spinacia oleracea	পালেঙ শাক (Pāleng Xāk)	পালঙ্গ শাক (Pālong Shāk)	પાલક (Pālak)	ಪಾಲಕ್ ಸೊಪ್ಪು (Palak Soppu)	ചീര(Chīra)	पालक (Pālak)	ପାଳଙ୍ଗ ଶାଗ (Pāḷanga Sāga)	ਪਾਲਕ (Pālak)	නිවිති (Niwithi-Ceylon Spinach)	பசலை கீரை (Pachallai Keerai)	పాలకూర (Paala Kūra)		پالك ساگ (Palak Sāg)	पालकाचीं पानां (Pālakāchin Pānã)	()	()	পালকি সাগ (Pālôki Sāg)	पाळग रा पान (Pāḷag rā Pān)
पत्ता गोभी (Pattā Gobhi)/ पात गोभी (Pāt Gobhi)/ बंद गोभी (Bãd Gobhi)	Cabbage	Brassica oleracea Linne capita	বন্ধাকবি (Bôndākôbi)	বাঁধাকপি (Bā̃dhākopi)	કોબીજ (Kobij)	ಎಲೆ ಕೋಸು (Ele Kōsu)	കാബേജ് (Kāmbej)	कोबी (Kobi)	ବନ୍ଧାକୋବି (Båndhākobi)	Patta gobhi / band gobhi	ගෝවා (Gōvā)	முட்டை கோஸ் (Muṭṭai Kol)	కోసుకూర (Kōsukūra)		گوبهي (Gobhi)		ꯀꯣꯕꯤ (Kobi)		বন্ঝা কোবি/পাত কোবি (Bônjhā Kobi/Pāt Kobi)	पत्ता गोभी (Pattā Gobhi)
पोइ साग (Poi Sāg)	Malabar spinach, phooi leaf, red vine spinach, creeping spinach, climbing spinach	Basella alba var rubra	পুঁই শাক (Pũi Xāk)	পুঁই শাক (Pũi Shāk)	પોઇ ના પાન (Poi nā Pān)	ಬಸಳೆ ಸೊಪ್ಪು / ಬಚ್ಚಲ ಸೊಪ್ಪು (Basaḷe Soppu / Bachchala Soppu)	വളളി ചിര (Vaḷḷi Chīra)	मायाळू (Māyāḷu)	ପୋଇ ଶାଗ (Poi Sāgå)	(Poi dā Sāg)	වැල් නිවිති (Væl Niviti)	கொடிப்பசலை (Koḍuva Challai)	బచ్చలికూర (Bachhali Kūra)	ಬಸಲೆ (Basalè)		(VaLchi Baji)			পোৰো সাগ (Poro Sāg)	पोइ रा पान (Poi rā Pān)
पुदीना पत्ता (Pudinā Pattā)	Mint leaves	Mentha spicata		পোদিনা পাতা (Podinā)	પુદિનો ના પાન (Pudino nā Pān)	ಪುದಿನ ಸೊಪ್ಪು (Pudina Soppu)	പുതീന ഇല (Putina Ila)	पुदीना (Pudinā)	ପୋଦିନା (Podinā)		මිංචි කොල (Minchi Kola)	புதினா (Pudina)	పుదీనా ఆకు (Pudina Āku)						পুদিনা পাত (Pudinā Pāt)	पोदीनो (Podino)
सरसों का साग (Sarsõ kā Sāg)	Mustard leaves	Brassica campestris	সৰিয়হ শাক (Xoriyah Xāk)	সর্ষে শাক (Sorshe Shāk)	સરસ્વાણિ ના પાન (Sarasvani no Pān)	ಸಾಸಿವೆ ಸೊಪ್ಪು (Sānive Soppu)	കടുകില (Kadukila)	मोहरीचा पाला (Moharichā Pālā)	ସୋରିଷଶାଗ (Soriså Sāgå)	ਸਰਸੋੰ ਦਾ ਸਾਗ (Sarsõ dā Sāg)	අබ කොල (Aba Kōla)	கடுகு கீரை (Kaṭiku Kīrai)	ఆవ ఆకు (Āva Āku)	()					সৰিসো সাগ (Sôriso Sāg)	सरसूं रा पान (Sarsũ rā Pān)
Suwa	Dill	Anethum graveolens	শুল্ফা Xulpha	–	સુવા/સવા Suvā/Savā	ಸಬ್ಬಸಿಗೆ ಸೊಪ್ಪು (Sabsige Soppu / Sabbasige Soppu)	–	शेपू Shepoo	ପାନମହୁରି/ପାନମଧୁରି Panamahuri/Panamadhuri	–	සූදුරු කොල Suduru Kola	சதகுப்பை Sathakuppai ||	సోయికూర(Soyi Koora) Shatapushpam (శతపుష్పం)							सोंवौ (Sõvou)
	Sessile joyweed	Alternanthera sessilis	–	–	–	ಹೊನಗೊನೆ	–	कोयपा (Koypa)	–	–	–	-பொன்னாங்கண்ணி கீரை	పొన్నగంటికూర Ponnaganti koora							
-	हरा प्याज़	Onion stalks, green/spring onion	Allium cepa					कांद्याची पात Kāndyāchi Pāt		ପିଆଜ ସାଇଁ Piaja sain		ළුණු කොල Luunu Kola	ఉల్లి కాడ(లు) Ulli kaada(lu) ఉల్లి పొరక(లు) Ulli Poraka(lu)							कांदा रा पान/हरो कांदो (Kãāndā rā Pān/Haro Kãāndo)
-कुसुम	Safflower leaves	Carthamus tinctorius						Karḍai करडई	କୁସୁମ; Kusuma				Kusuma akulu కుసుమ ఆకులు							कुसम (Kusam)
-	Argula	Eruca sativa				ಹಕ್ಕರಿಕೆ	–						హక్కిరికె ఆకు(hakkirike āku)							
	Catnip	Amaranthus Viridis					കുപ്പച്ചീര; Kuppacheera				කුප්පමේනිය Kuppamenia		Doggali Koora దొగ్గలికూర Chilaka Totakura చిలక తోటకూర							सौरभ (Sourabh)
Hindi	English	Botanical name	Assamese	Bengali	Gujarati	Kannada	Malayalam	Marathi	Odia	Punjabi	Sinhala	Tamil	Telugu	Tulu	Urdu	Konkani	Meitei	Nepali	Maithili	Rajasthani

== Root vegetables ==
Root vegetable names by various Indian languages
Hindi	English	Botanical name	Assamese	Bengali	Gujarati	Kannada	Malayalam	Marathi	Oriya	Punjabi	Sinhala	Tamil	Telugu	Tulu	Urdu	Konkani	Meitei	Nepali	Maithili	Rajasthani
आलू (Ālū)	Potato	Solanum tuberosum	আলু (Ālu)	আলু (Ālu)	બટાટા/બટાકા (Baṭāṭā/Baṭākā)	ಆಲೂಗಡ್ಡೆ (Alūgaḍe)	ഉരുളക്കിഴങ്ങ് (Uruḷakkizhangu)	बटाटा (Baṭāṭā)	ଆଳୁ/ବିଲାତିଆ ଆଳୁ (Āḷu/Bilātiyā Aḷu)	ਆਲੂ (Ālu)	අර්තාපල්/අල (Arthapal/Ala)	உருளை கிழங்கு (Uruḷai Kizhangu)	ఉర్లగడ్డ (Urlagaḍḍa-Rayalaseema Dialect) ఆలుగడ్డ (Ālugaḍḍa-Telangana Dialect), బంగాళాదుంప (Bangāḷādumpa-Kalinga Dialect)	ಬಟಾಟೆ (Baṭāṭe)	آلو (Ālu)	बोटटे (Boṭaṭe)	ꯑꯂꯨ (Alu)	आलु (Ālu)	आलु/আলু (Ālu)	बटाको/आलु (Baṭāko/Ālu)
अरबी (Arbi)/ अरुई (Arui)/ घुइयां (Ghuiyan)	Taro/ Colocasia	Colocasia esculenta	কচু (Kôsu)	কচু (Kôchu)	અળવી/ પત્તરવેલીયા (Aḷvi/Pattarveliyā)	ಕೆಸುವಿನ ಗಡ್ಡೆ (Kesuvinagaḍe)	ചേമ്പ് (Chembu)	अळकूडी/अरवी (Aḷkuḍi/Aravi)	ସାରୁ (Sāru)	ਅਰਬੀ (Arbi)	හබරළ (Habarala)	சேப்பங்கிழங்கு (Seppan Kizhangu)	చామగడ్డ, చామ దుంప (Chāma Gaḍḍa/Dumpa)	ತೆಬುಡ/ಕಂಡೆ (Tevuḍā/Kanḍe)	أروي (Arvī)	पोत्रडे (Potraḍe)	ꯄꯥꯟ (Pān)	कर्कलो (Karkalo)		पिण्डाळू/अरवी (Pinḍaḷu/Arvi)
गाजर (Gājar)	Carrot	Daucus carota sativus	গাজৰ (Gazôr)	গাজর (Gajor)	ગાજર (Gājar)	ಗಜ್ಜರಿ (Gajjari)	സീമ മുള്ളങ്കി/കാരറ്റ്‌ (Sīma Muḷḷangi/ Carrot)	गाजर (Gājar)	ଗାଜର (Gājara)	ਗਾਜਰ (Gājar)	කැරට් (Kaeraṭi)	மங்கல் முள்ளங்கி/கேரட் (Mangal Muḷḷangi/Carroṭ)	క్యారెట్ (Carroṭ) గాజరగడ్డ (Gājara Gaḍḍa	()	گاجر (Gājar)		ꯒꯥꯖꯔ (Gājar)	गाजर (Gājar)		गाजर (Gājar)
गांठ गोभी (Gānṭh Gobhi)	Kohlrabi/ German Turnip	Brassica oleracea Gongylodes Group	ওলকবি (Ůlkobi)	ওলকপি (Olkopi)	નવલકોલ (Navalkol)	ನವಿಲು ಕೋಸು (Navilu Kōsu)	നൂല്കോല് (Nūlkol/ Nūkkal)	नवलकोल (Navalkol)	ଓଲ କୋବି (Ola Kobi)	ਗੰਠ ਗੋਬੀ (Gānṭh Gobi)	නෝකෝල් (Nōkōl)	நூல் கோல் (Nūlkōl)	నోకోల్ (Nūlkol)		شلجم (Shalgam)					नवलकोल (Navalkol)
सूरन (Sūran)/ जिमीकंद (Jimikand)/ रतालू (Ratalū)	Elephant foot yam	Amorphophallus paeoniifolius	কাঠ আলু (Kāth Ālu)	খাম আলু (Khām Ālu)	સૂરણ (Sūraṇ)	ಸುವರ್ಣ ಗಡ್ಡೆ (Suvarṇa Gaḍḍe)	ചേന (Chena)	सुरण (Suraṇ)	ଦେଶୀୟା ଆଳୁ/ମାଟିଆ ଆଳୁ (Desiā Āḷu/Matiā Āḷu)	ਜਿਮੀਕੰਦ (Jimikand)	රාජ අල (Rāja Ala)	சேனை கிழங்கு (Seṇai Kizhanghu)	కంద గడ్డ (Kanda Gaḍḍa)	ಸೂರಣ ಕಂಡೆ (Suraṇ Kanḍe)	زمين قند (Zamīn Qand)	सुर्ण (Surṇ)			ओल/ওল (Ōl)	ओल/सूरण (Ol/Suraṇ)
मूली (Mūli)/ मुरई (Murai)	Radish	Raphanus sativus	মূলা Mula	মুলো/মুলা (Mulo/ Mula)	મૂળો (Muḷo)	ಮೂಲಂಗಿ (Mūlangi)	മുള്ളന്ഗി (Muḷḷangi)	मुळा (Muḷā)	ମୂଳା (Muḷā)	ਮੁਲੀ (Mooli)	රාබු (Rābu)	முள்ளங்கி (Muḷḷangi)	ముల్లంగి (Mullangi)	ಮೂಲೆಂಗಿ (Mulengi)	مولي (Mūli)	मुळो (Muḷo)	ꯃꯨꯂꯥ (Mulā)	मुला (Mulā)	()	मूळी (Muḷi)
साबू (Sābu)	Tapioca/ Cassava	Manihot esculenta	চাগু (Sāgu)	সাগু (Shāgu)	સાબુ (Sābu)	ಮರಗೆಣಸು (Marageṇasu)	കപ്പ/പൂള, മരച്ചീനി/ചീനി (Kappa/Pūḷa/Marachīni /Chīni)	शेवरकंद (Shevarkand)	ଶାଗୁ (Sāgu)	ਸਾਬੁ (Sābu)	මයියොක්කා (Mayiyokka)	மரவள்ளி கிழங்கு (Maravaḷḷikezangu/ Kuchikezangu)	కఱ్ఱ పెండలం (Karra Penḍalam)	ಮಾರಾ ಗಿರೆಂಗ್ (Mārā Gireng)	ساگودا نه (Sagudana)	रूक कंगी (Rūka Kangi)				साबू (Sābū)
शकरकंद (Shakarkand)/ (Kanna)	Sweet potato	Ipomoca batata	মিঠা আলু (Mitha Alu)	মিষ্টি আলু/রাঙা আলু (Mishṭi Alu/Ranga Alu)	શક્કરીયા (Shakkariyā)	ಗೆಣಸು (Genasu)	മധുരക്കിഴങ്ങ് (Madhurakkizhangu)	रताळे (Ratāḷe)	କନ୍ଦମୂଳ (Kandamula)	(Shakkar Kandi)	බතල (Bathala)	சர்க்கரைவள்ளி கிழங்கு (Sarkaraivalli Kizhangu)	చిలగడదుంప/ గెనుసుగడ్డ (Chilakadadumpa/Genusugadda)	(Kereng)	شكر قند (Shakar Qand)	(Kangi)			अलुआ/অলুআ (Aluā)	रताळू/सक्करगांठ (Rataḷū/Sakkargānṭh)
चुकंदर (Chukandar)	Beetroot	Beta vulgaris	বিট (Bit)	বিট (Biṭ)	બીટ (Bīṭ)	ಬೀಟ್ರೂಟ್ (Beetroot)	ബീട്രൂറ്റ്‌ ()	बीट (beet)	ବିଟ୍ (Beet)	(Chukender)	රතු අල (Rathu Ala) බීට් රූට් (Beet Ruut)	பீட் ரூட் (beet root/senkizhangu)	బీటుదుంప (Beet Root, ఎర్రదుంప (erradumpa)		چقندر (Chuqandar)	(Bitroot)				चुकंदर (Chukandar)
शलजम (Shalzam)/ शलगम (Shalgam)	Turnip	Brassica rapa rapa	চালগোম (Salgům)	শালগম (Shalgom)	શલગમ (Shalgam)	ನವಿಲ್ ಕೋಸು (Navil Kosu)	മുള്ളങ്കി (Muḷḷangi)	सलगम (Salgam)	ଶାଲଗମ (Sālagama)	(Shalgam/ salgam/ saljam)		நூல் கோல் (Knolkol)	ఎర్ర ముల్లంగి దుంప (Erra Mullangi Dumpa)		شلجم / (shaljam)	(knolkol)			शलगम/শলগম (Shalgam)	सळजम (Saḷjam)
मिश्रीकंद (Mishrikand)	Jícama/Yam bean	Pachyrhizus erosus		শাঁখ আলু (Sankhalu)	()	()	()	कोनफळ/गोराडू (konphaḷ/gorāḍu)	ଶଙ୍ଖ ସାରୁ (Shankha Saru)	()		()	Kandha (కంద) Kandagadda (కందగడ్డ)	()	()	()	()	()	()	संखाळू (Sankhaḷū)
अरारोट (Arāroṭ)/ शिशुमूल (Shishumūl)	Arrowroot		আৰোৰুট (Arorut)	আরোরুট (Āroruṭ)	તવખીર/ખેળ/આરારૂટ (Tavkhīr/Kheḷ/Ārāruṭ)	ಹೂವ/ಬಾಣದ ಬೇರು (Hūva/Bāṇada Bēru)	ബിലാത്തി കൂവ (Bilati Kūva)	सहस्त्रपर्णी/तवकीर (Sahastraparṇī/Tavkīr)	ପାଳୁଅ (Paḷua)	()	()	ஆடுபங்கரை/கூவை (Aḍupangarai/Kūvai)	పాలగుండ (Pālagunḍa)	()	()	()	()	()	()	आरारोट (Ārāroṭ)
कमल ककड़ी (Kamal Kakḍī)	Lotus root	Nelumbo nucifera	পদুমৰ মূল (Podumor Mūl)	পদ্মর মূল / পদ্মপঁড়ি (Padmar Mūl / Padmapõṛi)	કમળ કાકડી (Kamaḷ Kākaḍī)	ತಾವರೆ ಗೆಡ್ಡೆ (Tāvare Geḍḍe)	താമരക്കിഴങ്ങ് (Thāmarakkizhaṅṅŭ)	कमळाचे कंद (Kamaḷāchē Kand)	ପଦ୍ମ ମୂଳ (Padma Mūḷa)	ਕਮਲ ਕੱਕੜੀ (Kamal Kakkaṛī) / ਭੀਂ (Bhīṅ)	නෙළුම් අල (Neḷum Ala)	தாமரைக்கிழங்கு (Tāmaraikkiḻaṅku)	తామర వేరు (Tāmara Vēru)	ತಾವರೆ ಗೆಡ್ಡೆ (Tāvare Geḍḍe)	(Kamal Kakḍī)	कमळाचे कंद (Kamaḷāchē Kand)	ꯊꯝꯕꯥꯜ ꯊꯥꯔꯣ (Thambal Tharo)	कमलको जरा (Kamalko Jarā)	कमल ककड़ी (Kamal Kakḍī)	कमल ककड़ी (Kamal Kakḍī)
Hindi	English	Botanical name	Assamese	Bengali	Gujarati	Kannada	Malayalam	Marathi	Oriya	Punjabi	Sinhala	Tamil	Telugu	Tulu	Urdu	Konkani	Meitei	Nepali	Maithili	Rajasthani

== Other vegetables ==
Other vegetable names by various Indian languages
Hindi	English	Botanical name	Assamese	Bengali	Gujarati	Kannada	Malayalam	Marathi	Oriya	Punjabi	Sinhala	Tamil	Telugu	Tulu	Urdu	Konkani	Meitei	Nepali	Maithili	Rajasthani
बैंगन (Baingan)/ भाँटा (Bhâṭā)	Eggplant/ Aubergine/ Brinjal	Solanum melongena	বেঙেনা (Bêngênā)	বেগুন (Begun)	રીંગણ (Rĩgaṇ)	ಬದನೇಕಾಯಿ (Badanēkāyi)	വഴുതനങ്ങ (Vazhuthananga)	वांगी (Vngi)	ବାଇଗଣ (Bāigaṇa)	ਬੈੰਗਣ/ਬਤਾਊ (Baingaṇ/Batāu)	වම්බොටු (Wamiboṭu)	கத்தரிக்காய் (Kattari Kāy)	వంకాయ (Vankāya)	ಬದನೆ/ಗುಲ್ಲ (Badanè/Gulla)	بيگن؛ (Baigan)	वैंगेण (Vægeṇ)	ꯈꯃꯦꯟ ꯕꯔꯃꯁꯤꯀꯥ (Khamen Barmasikā)	भेण्टा (Bhenṭa)	ভঁটা (Bhâṭā)	भटो (Bhaṭo-round one) रींगणौ (Ringaṇo- longer one)
भिंडी (Bhĩḍi)	Okra/ Lady's finger	Abelmoschus esculentus	ভেন্দি (Bhendi)	ঢেঁড়স (Dhêṛosh)	ભિંડા (Bhĩḍa)	ಬೆಂಡೆ ಕಾಯಿ (Benḍe Kāyi)	വെണ്ടയ്ക (Venḍakka)	भेंडी (Bhenḍi)	ଭେଣ୍ଡି (Bhenḍi)	ਭਿੰਡੀ (Bhĩḍi)	බණ්ඩක්කා (Banḍakka)	வெண்டைக்காய் (Venḍai Kaai)	బెండకాయ (Benḍa Kaya)	ಬೆಂಡೆ ಕಾಯ್ (Benḍè Kāy)	بهندى؛ (Bhinḍi)	बेण्डे (Benḍe)	ꯕꯦꯂꯦꯟꯗꯔꯤ (Belendari)	भिंडी (Bhinḍi)	ৰামঝিমনী (Rāmjhimni)	विरंडी/भिंडी (Viranḍi/Bhinḍi)
फूलगोभी (Phūlgobhi)/ गोभी (Gobhi)	Cauliflower	Brassica oleracea	ফুলকবি (Phulkobi)	ফুলকপি (Phulkopi)	ફુલેવાર (Fulevār)	ಹೂ ಕೋಸು (Hū Kōsu)	കോളിഫ്ലോവേര് (Cauliflower)	फ्लॉवर्/फुलकोबी (Flower/Phūlkobi)	ଫୁଲ କୋବି (Phula Kobi)	ਫੁੱਲ ਗੋਬੀ (Phull Gobi)	මල් ගෝවා (Mal Govā)	காலி ப்லோவர் (Cauliflower)	కోసు పువ్వు, క్యాలీఫ్లవర్, గోబి పువ్వు (Kōsu Puvvu/Cauliflower/ Gōbi Puvvu)	()	گوبهي كا پهول (Gobhi Kā Phūl)		ꯀꯣꯕꯤ ꯂꯦꯏ (Kobi Lei)	काचो बंधा (Kācho Bandhā)	ফূলকোবি (FulKobi)	फूळगोभी (Phuḷgobhi)
सहजन (Sahjan)	Drumstick	Moringa oleifera	চজিনা (Sozina)	শজিনা ডাঁটা/ শজনে ডাঁটা (Shojina Ḍãṭa/Shojne Ḍãṭa)	સરગવાણી શિંગ (Saragwāṇi Shing)	ನುಗ್ಗೇ ಕಾಯಿ (Nugge Kāyi)	മുരിങ്ങയ്ക (Muringakka)	शेवग्याच्या शेंगा (Shevgyāchyā Shengā)	ମୁଙ୍ଗା/ସଜନା ଛୁଇଁ (Mungā/Sajanā Chuin)		මුරුංගා (Murungā)	முருங்கை (Murungai)	మునగకాయ, ములక్కాడ,మునకాయ (MunagaKāya/Mulakkāḍa/Munakkāya)	ನುರ್ಗೇ (Nūrgae)	سيجن پهلى (Sījan Phalli)	मूस्का सुंग (Mūska Sung)	()	सजिवन (Sajivan)	সোহজন (Sohjan)	सहजन (Sahjan)
शिमला मिर्च (Shimlā Mirch)	Capsicum/ Bell pepper	Capsicum annuum	ক্যাপচিকাম (Kêpsikam)	ক্যাপসিকাম (Kêpsikam)	ઘોલાર મર્ચા/ભોંભા મર્ચા (Gholār Marchā/Bhombhā Marchā)	ದೊಣ್ಣೆ ಮೆಣಸಿನ ಕಾಯಿ (Doṇṇe Meṇasina kāyi)	കാപ്സികം (Capsicum)	ढोबळी मिरची (Ḍhobaḷi Mirchi)	ଶିମଲା ଲଙ୍କା (Simalā Lankā)	ਸਿਮਲਾ ਮਿਰਚ (Simlā Mirch)	මාලු මිරිස් (Mālu Miris)	குடை மிளகாய் (Kuḍai Miḷagai)	బుంగ/బుట్ట మిరపకాయ, బెంగళూరు మిరప, బెంగళూరు మిర్చి, సిమ్లా మిర్చి (Bunga/Buṭṭa Mirapa Kāya) (Bengaḷuru Mirapa) (Bengaḷuru Mirchi, Simlā Mirchi)		شمله مرچ (Shimlā Mirch)		ꯁꯤꯃꯂꯥ ꯃꯣꯔꯣꯛ (Shimlā Morok)	भेडे खुर्सानी (Bheḍe Khursāni)	শিমলা মৰ্চাই (Shimlā Marchāi)	भोंभो पितकाळी/डबो मिरची (Bhombho Pitkāḷi/Ḍabo Mirchi)
टमाटर (Ṭamāṭar)	Tomato	Solanum lycopersicum	বিলাহী (Bilahi)	টমেটো (Ṭômeṭo)	ટામેટા (Ṭāmetā)	ಗೂದಿ ಹಣ್ಣು (Gūdi Haṇṇu)	തക്കാളി (Thakkāḷḷi)	टोमॅटो (Tomato)	ବିଲାତି ବାଇଗଣ /ପାତାଳସୁରି/ ପାତାଲ୍ ଘଣ୍ଟା (Bilati Baigaṇa/Pātāḷasuri/Pātālghaṇṭā)	ਟਮਾਟਰ (Ṭamāṭar)	තක්කාලි (Thakkali)	தக்காளி (Thakkāḷi)	రామ్ములగపండు, తక్కాళీ, తక్కాళకాయ (Rāmmulaga Panḍu, Takkāḷi Takkāḷakāya-Rayalseema Dialect) టమాటా (Ṭamāṭā-Telangana Dialect) టమాట/పుల్లవంకాయ (Ṭamāṭa/Pullavankāya-Kalinga Dialect)	ಟೂಮೆಟಾ (Ṭōmeṭā)	(Ṭamāṭar)	टमाटो (Ṭomaṭo)	ꯈꯃꯦꯟ ꯑꯁꯤꯅꯕꯤ (Khamen Asinbi)	टमाटर (Ṭamāṭar)	টমাটৰ (Ṭamāṭar)	टमाटर (Ṭamāṭar)
कच्चा कटहल (Kacchā Kaṭahal-unripe) पक्का कटहल (Pakkā Kaṭahal-ripe)	Jackfruit	Artocarpus heterophyllus	কঁঠাল (Kôthal)	ইঁচর (Ichor-young) কাঁঠাল (Kãṭhal-mature)	કાચા ફણસ (Kāchā Faṇas) પાકા ફણસ (Pākā Faṇas)	ಹಲಸಿನ ಕಾಯಿ (Halasina Kāyi) ಹಲಸಿನ ಹಣ್ಣು (Halasina Haṇṇu)	പഴുക്കാത്ത ചക്ക (Pazhukattha Chakka) പഴുത്ത ചക്ക (Pazhuttha Chakka)	कच्च्या फणस (Kacchya Faṇas) पिक्लेल्या फणस (Piklelyā Faṇas)	କଠା/ପଣସ କଠା (Kaṭha/Paṇasa Kaṭha) ପାଚିିଲା ପଣସ (Pāchilā Paṇasa)	ਕਟਹਲ (Kaṭahal)	කොස් (Kos)	பலாக்காய்/ பலாப்பழம் Palākkai/Palāpazham)	పనస కాయ (Panasa Kāya)	ಪೆಲಕಾಯಿ/ಗುಜ್ಜೆ (Pelakāi/Gujjè)	ڭتهل (Kaṭahal)	पोणोस (Poṇos)	ꯊꯏꯕꯣꯡ (Thaibong)	कटहर (Kaṭahar)	কাচা কটহৰ (Kāchā Kôṭôhôr) পাকল কটহৰ (Pākal Kôṭôhôr)	काचो फाणस (Kācho Fāṇas) पाको फाणस (Pāko Fāṇas)
हैबनेरो (Habanero)	Habanero	Capsicum chinense	হাবানেরো (Habānērō)	হাবানেরো (Habānērō)	હેબેનેરો (Hebēnērō)	ಹಬನೆರೊ (Habanero)	ഹബനേറോ (Habanērō)	हॅबनेरो (Hăbanērō)	ହାବାନେରୋ (Hābānērō)	ਹੈਬਾਨੇਰੋ (Haibānērō)	හබානෙරෝ (Habānerō)	ஹபனெரோ (Hapaṉerō)	లాంతరు మిరపకాయ (Lāntaru Mirapakāya)	ಹಬನೆರೊ (Habanero)	(Habanero)	हॅबनेरो (Hăbanērō)	ꯍꯥꯕꯥꯅꯦꯔꯣ (Habanero)	हाबानेरो (Hābānērō)	हैबनेरो (Haibānērō)	हैबनेरो (Haibānērō)
Hindi	English	Botanical name	Assamese	Bengali	Gujarati	Kannada	Malayalam	Marathi	Oriya	Punjabi	Sinhala	Tamil	Telugu	Tulu	Urdu	Konkani	Meitei	Nepali	Maithili	Rajasthani

== Nuts ==
Nut names by various Indian languages
Hindi	English	Botanical name	Assamese	Bengali	Gujarati	Kannada	Malayalam	Marathi	Oriya	Punjabi	Sinhala	Tamil	Telugu	Tulu	Urdu	Konkani	Meitei	Maithili	Nepali	Rajasthani
बादाम Badaam	Almond		বাদাম; Badam	বাদাম; Badam	Badam	ಬಾದಾಮಿ (Badami)	ബദാം പരിപ്പ് (Badam Parippu)	बदाम; Badām	ପେସ୍ତା ବାଦାମ; Pesta Badam			பாதாம் பருப்பு	Badam Pappu బాదం పప్పు	Bādam	بادام / baadaam	Badam				बिदाम/बदाम (Bidām/Badām)
काजू Kaju	Cashew	Anacardium occidentale	কাজু বাদাম; Kazu Badam	কাজু বাদাম; Kaju Badam	Kaju	ಗೋಡಂಬಿ (Godambi)	കശുവണ്ടി പരിപ്പ്,കപ്പലണ്ടി പരിപ്പ് (Kashu Andiparippu, Kappalandy Parippu)	काजू Kāju	କାଜୁ ବାଦାମ/ଲଙ୍କା ଆମ୍ବ; Kaju Badam/ Lanka Amba		කජු Kaju	முந்திரி பருப்பு (mundiri)	Jeedipappu(జీడిపప్పు) /Kaaju(కాజు)	Beeja / Korantu	كاجو / kaaju	Kaju				काजू (Kāju)
बादाम Badaam	Indian almond	Terminalia catappa	শিলিখা Xilikha	কাঠ বাদাম; Kaṭh Badam	Badam		ബദാം	Badaam	କାଠ ବାଦାମ; Katha Badam	Prunus amygdales	කොට්ටම්බා Kottamba		Baadam		بادام / baadaam	Badam				बिदाम/बदाम (Bidām/Badām)
मूँगफली Moongphali/ चिनिया बादाम Chiniya Badaam	Peanut/ Groundnut	Arachis hypogea	বাদাম; Badam	চীনা বাদাম; China Badam	Magfali / Shing	ಕಡಲೆ ಕಾಯಿ / ಶೇಂಗಾ ಬೀಜ / ನೆಲಗಡಲೆ (Kadale Kaayi / Shenga Beeja / Nelagadale)	നിലക്കടല (Nila Kadala)	शेंगदाणा Shengdāṇā	ଚିନା ବାଦାମ; China Badam		රට කජු Rata Kaju	வேர்க்கடலை / மணிலா பயறு Kadalai / kachaan kadalai	Verusenagakaya(వేరుశనగకాయ), Palli(పల్లీ)	Nelakadale	مونگ پهلي / moong phalli	Bhuny Tsane				मूंफळी (Mūnphaḷī)
पिस्ता Pista	Pistachio			পিস্তা/পেস্তা Pista/ Pesta	Pista	Pista		पिस्ता Pistā	ପିସ୍ତା Pista		පිස්ටා ඇට Pista Ata		Pista Pappu		پسته / pista					पिसतो (Pisto)
अखरोट Akhroṭ	Walnut		আখ্ৰোট; Akhrůt	আখরোট; Akhroṭ	Akharot			अक्रोड; Akroḍ	ଅଖରୋଟ୍ Akharot			Wallnut	Akrootukaya అక్రోటుకాయ		أخروت / Akhhroot					अखरोट (Akhroṭ)
सुपारी Supārī	Areca nut	Areca catechu	তামোল/ গুৱা Tamůl/ Guwa	সুপারি Shupari	Sopari	ಅಡಿಕೆ (Adike)	അടയ്ക്ക (Adakka)	सुपारी Supāri	ଗୁଆ; Guaa		පුවක් Puvak	பாக்கு (paakku)	Vakka వక్క	bajjai	سپاري / supaari	PopoL				पूग/सोपारी (Pūg/Sopārī)
Hindi	English	Botanical name	Assamese	Bengali	Gujarati	Kannada	Malayalam	Marathi	Oriya	Punjabi	Sinhala	Tamil	Telugu	Tulu	Urdu	Konkani	Meitei	Maithili	Nepali	Rajasthani

== Legumes ==
Legume names by various Indian languages
Hindi	English	Botanical name	Assamese	Bengali	Gujarati	Kannada	Malayalam	Marathi	Oriya	Punjabi	Sinhala	Tamil	Telugu	Tulu	Urdu	Konkani	Meitei	Nepali	Maithili	Rajasthani
मटर (Maṭar)	Pea	Pisum sativum	মটৰ (Môtôr)	মটর (Môṭor)	વાટણ (Vātaṇa)	ಹಸಿರು ಬಟಾಣಿ (Hasiru Batāṇe)	പട്ടാണി (Pattāṇi)	/मटार (Vātaṇā/Maṭār)	ମଟର ଛୁଇଁ/ମଟର (Maṭara Chhuin/Maṭara)	(Maṭar)	ඇටය (Aeṭaya)	பட்டாணி (Paṭṭāṇi)	బఠాని (Batāni)	(Batāṇa)	(Maṭar Phalli)	()	()	()	()	वटला/मटर (Vaṭla/Maṭar)
ग्वारफली Gwarphali	Cluster beans	Cyamopsis tetragonolobus			Guvar	ಗೋರಿ ಕಾಯಿ (Gori Kayi) / ಚವಳಿಕಾಯಿ (ChavaLi Kayi)	ബീന്സ്‌(Beans)	गवार; Gavār	ଗୁଆଁର; Guanra	France Bean/Phaliyaan (plural)		கொத்தவரங்காய் (Kothavarangai)	గోరు/వర౦గ చిక్కుడుకాయ (Goru/Varanga Chikkudu Kaya)		gawarphalli/گوار	()	()	()	()	गंवारफळी (Gãwārphaḷī)
बोडा Boda	French beans/ Green beans				Fansi	ಹುರಳಿ ಕಾಯಿ (Hurali Kayi)	പയര്(Payar)	घेवडा/फरसबी ghevḍa/faras bee	ବିନ୍ Bean		බෝංචි Bonchi	பீன்ஸ்	పచ్చి బఠాని		beans/بينس	()	()	()	()	फ्रेंच बिन (Frènch Bīn)
लोबिया की फलियाँ	Cowpea					(Alsande)		चवळीची शेंगा Chawlichi shengā	ଝୁଡ଼ଙ୍ଗ; Jhudanga				అలసందలు/అలచందలు							चंवळा री फळ्यां/फळियां (Chãwaḷā ri Phaḷyã/Phaḷiyã)
Hindi	English	Botanical name	Assamese	Bengali	Gujarati	Kannada	Malayalam	Marathi	Oriya	Punjabi	Sinhala	Tamil	Telugu	Tulu	Urdu	Konkani	Meitei	Nepali	Maithili	Rajasthani

== Flour ==
Flour names by various Indian languages
Hindi	English	Botanical name	Assamese	Bengali	Gujarati	Kannada	Malayalam	Marathi	Oriya	Punjabi	Sinhala	Tamil	Telugu	Tulu	Urdu	Konkani	Meitei	Nepali	Maithili	Rajasthani
आटा (Āṭā)	Flour		গুড়ি (Guri)	গুঁড়া (Gũṛā)	લોટ (Loṭ)	ಹಿಟ್ಟು (Hiṭṭu)	പ്പൊടി/മാവ് (Poḍi/Māvû)	पिठ (Piṭh)	ଗୁଣ୍ଡ (Gunḍå)	ਆਟਾ (Āṭā)	පිටි (Piṭi)	மாவு (Māvu)	పిండి (Pinḍi)	ಪೋಡಿ (Poḍi)	(Āṭā)	पीठ (Piṭh)	ꯁꯨꯕꯤ (Subi)	पिठो (Piṭho)	চিক্কস (Chikkas)	पिसान (Pisān)
गुंथा हुआ आटा (Gũthā huā Āṭā)	Dough		()	মাখা হওয়া গুঁড়া (Mākhā haowā Gũṛā)	બાંધેલો લોટ (Gũndelo Loṭ)	ಬೆರೆಸಿದ ಹಿಟ್ಟು (Beresida Hiṭṭu)	കുഴച്ച മാവ് (Kuzhichcha Mavû/Poḍi)	मळलेले पीठ (Maḷalele Piṭh)	ଚକଟିଥିବା ଗୁଣ୍ଡ (Chåkåṭithibā Gunḍå)	ਗੁੰਨਿਆ ਹੋਇਆ ਆਟਾ (Gũniā hoiā Āṭā)		பிசைந்த மாவு (Pichaitta Māvu)	పిసికిన పిండి (Pisikinā Pinḍi)	()						
मैदा (Maida)	Refined wheat flour		ময়দা (Môydā)	ময়দা (Môeda)	મેંદો (Mẽdo)	ಮೈದಾ ಹಿಟ್ಟು (Maidā Hiṭṭu)	മൈദാ മാവ് (Maidā Māvu)	मैदा (Maidā)	ମଇଦା (Måidā)	ਮੈਦਾ (Maidā)	තිරිඟු පිටි (Tiringu Piṭi)	மைதா (Maidā)	మైదా పిండి (Maidā Pinḍi)	ಮೈದಾ ಪೊಡಿ (Maidā Poḍi)	ميده (Maidā)	मैदा (Maidā)	ꯃꯩꯗꯥ (Maidā)	मैदा (Maidā)	মৈদা (Maidā)	मेदो (Mèdo)
गेहुं का आटा/आटा (Gehũ kā Āṭā/Āṭā)	Wheat flour		গমৰ গুড়ি /আটা (Gômor Guri/Ātā)	গমের গুঁড়া/আটা (Gômer Gũṛā/Āṭā)	ઘઉં નો લોટ (Ghãu nā Loṭ)	ಗೋಧಿ ಹಿಟ್ಟು (Gōdhi Hiṭṭu)	ഗോതമ്പ് പൊടി (Gōdambu Poḍi)	कणीक/पोळीचे पीठ/चपातीचे पीठ (Kaṇik/Poḷiche Piṭh/Chapātiche Piṭh)	ଗହମର ଗୁଣ୍ଡ (Gåhåmårå Gunḍå) ଅଟା (Aṭa)	ਆਟਾ (Āṭā)	ආට පිටි (Āṭa Piṭi)	கோதுமை மாவு (Gōdumai Māvu)	గోధుమ పిండి (Gōdhuma Pinḍi) గోధుమ నూక/రవ్వ (Gōdhuma Nūka/Ravva-Cracked Wheat Flour)	ಗೋದಿ ಪೊಡಿ (Gōdi Poḍi)	گيهو كا آتا(Gehun ka Aaṭa)	गावा पीठ (Gāvā Piṭh)	ꯒꯦꯍꯨ ꯁꯨꯕꯤ (Gehu Subi)	गहूँ को आटा (Gahũ ko Āṭa)	গহুমঽক চিক্কস (Gahumək Chikkas)	गऊं/गेऊं रो पिसान (Gaũ/Geũ ro Pisān)
सूजी Sūji	Semolina		চুজি (Suzi)	সুজি (Shuji)	સોજી/રવો (Soji /Ravo)	ರವೆ (Rave)	സൂജി (Sūji)	रवा (Ravā)	ସୁଜି (Suji)	ਸੁਜੀ (Sooji)	සෙමොලිනා (Semolina)	ரவை (Ravai)	రవ్వ (Ravva)	ಸಪುರ ಸಜ್ಜಿಗೇ (Sapura Sajjigae)	سوجى (Soji)	रवा (Ravā)	ꯁꯨꯖꯤ (Suji)	सूजी (Sūji)	সুজ্জি (Sujji)	सूजी (Sūji)
चावल का आटा (Chāval kā Āṭa)	Rice flour		চাউলৰ গুড়ি (Sāulôr Guri)	চালের গুঁড়া (Chāler Gũṛā)	ચોખાનો લોટ (Chokhāno Loṭ)	ಅಕ್ಕಿ ಹಿಟ್ಟು (Akki Hiṭṭu)	അരിപ്പൊടി (Ari Poḍi)	तांदुळाची पिठी (Tānduḷāchi Piṭhi)	ଚାଉଳର ଗୁଣ୍ଡ (Chāuḷårå Gunḍå)	ਚੋਲ ਦਾ ਆਟਾ (Chôl dā Āṭā)	හාල් පිටි (Hāl Piṭi)	அரிசி மாவு (Arisi Māvu)	బియ్యం పిండి (Biyyam Pinḍi) వరిపిండి (Varipinḍi) నెచ్చు (Nechchu)	ಅರಿತ ಪೊಡಿ (Arita Poḍi)	چاول كا آتا (Chāval kā Āṭa)	तांदळाच्या पीठ (Tānduḷāchyā Piṭh)	ꯆꯦꯡ ꯁꯨꯕꯤ (Cheng Subi)	चामल को पिठो (Chāmal ko Piṭho)	চাউৰঽক চিক্কস (Chāurək Chikkas) / চাউৰঠ (Chāuraṭh)	चावळ/चोखा रो पिसान (Chāwaḷ/Chokhā ro Pisān)
मक्कई का आटा (Makkai kā Āṭā)	Cornflour		মাকইৰ গুু়ড়ি/মাকইৰ আটা (Mākoir Guri/Mākair Āta)	মাক্কাইর/ভুুটের গুড়া (Mākkāir/Bhuṭer Gũṛā)	મકાઈનો લોટ (Makāino Loṭ)	ಮುಸುಕಿನ/ಮೆಕ್ಕೆ ಜೋಳದ ಹಿಟ್ಟು (Musukina / Mekke Jōḷada Hiṭṭu)	ചോളപ്പൊടി (Chōḷa Poḍi)	मक्याचे पीठ (Makyāche Piṭh)	ମକାର ଗୁଣ୍ଡ (Måkārå Gunḍå)	ਮੱਕੀ ਦਾ ਆਟਾ (Makki dā Āṭā)	බඩ ඉරිඟු පිටි (Baḍa-Iringu Piṭi)	சோள மாவு (Sōḷa Māvu)	మొక్కజొన్న పిండి (Mokka Jōnna Pinḍi)	()	مكئ كا آتا (Makai ka Āṭā)	मकोच्या पीठ (Makochyā Piṭh)	ꯆꯨꯖꯛ ꯁꯨꯕꯤ (Chujak Subi)	मक्कै को पिठो (Makkai ko Piṭho)	মকৈকেৰ চিক্কস (Makai ker Chikkas)	मक्का रो पिसान (Makkā ro Pisān)
जुवार का आटा (Juvār ka Āṭā)	Sorghum flour		বাৰ্লি (Barli)	সক্তু (Shoktu)	જૂવારનો લોટ (Juvārno Loṭ)	ಜೋಳದ ಹಿಟ್ಟು (Joḷada Hiṭṭu)	യവം പോടി (Yavam Poḍi)	ज्वारीचे पीठ (Jwāriche Piṭh)	ଯୁବାର/ଯୁଆରର ଗୁଣ୍ଡ (Jubārårå/Juārårå Gunḍå) ବାର୍ଲି (Bārli)	ਜਵਾਰ ਦਾ ਆਟਾ (Jawār dā Āṭa)		வாற் கோதுமை (Vaar Godhumai)	జొన్న పిండి (Jōnna Pinḍi)		جوار كا آتا (Jowar ka Āṭa)		ꯖꯣꯋꯥꯔ ꯁꯨꯕꯤ (Jowār Subi)	()	জৱাৰকেৰ চিক্কস (Jawār ker Chikkas)	जुवार रो पिसान (Juvār ro Pisān)
बाजरे का आटा Bājre ka Āṭā	Millet (finger millet) flour			মারওআএর গুড়া (Māroāer Gũṛā)	બાજરી નો લોટ (Bājri no Loṭ)	ಸಜ್ಜೆ ಹಿಟ್ಟು (Sajje Hiṭṭu)	കൂവരക് (Koovaraku)	बाजरीचे पीठ (Bājriche Piṭh)	ମାଣ୍ଡିଆର ଗୁଣ୍ଡ (Māndiārå Gunḍå)		කුරක්කන් පිටි (Kurakkan Piṭi)	கேழ்வரகு (Kezhvaragu)	సజ్జ పిండి (Sajja Pinḍi)	ಸಜ್ಜೆ ಪೋಡಿ (Sajje Poḍi)	(Bājre ka Āṭā)		ꯕꯖꯔꯥ ꯁꯨꯕꯤ (Bajrā Subi)	बाजरा को पीठ (Bājrā ko Piṭh)	বাজৰাকেৰ চিক্কস (Bājrā ker Chikkas)	बाजरा रो पिसान (Bājrā ro Pisān)
बेसन (Besan)	Gram flour		বেচন (Besôn)	বেসন (Beshon)	વેસન/ ચણાનો લોટ (Vesan/Chaṇāno Loṭ)	ಕಡಲೆ ಹಿಟ್ಟು (Kadale Hiṭṭu)	കടലപ്പൊടി (Kaḍala Poḍi)	बेसन (Besan) हरभऱ्याचे पीठ/डाळीचे पीठ (Harbharyāche Piṭh/Ḍāḷiche Piṭh)	ଭୁୁଟ/ବୁୁଟ ଚଣା ଗୁଣ୍ଡ (Bhuṭå/Buṭå Chåṇā Gunḍå) ବେସନ (Besånå)	ਬੇਸਨ (Besan)	කඩල පිටි (Kaḍala Piṭi)	கடலை மாவு (Kaḍalai Māvu)	శనగపిండి (Senaga Pinḍi)	ಕಡಲೆ ಪೊಡಿ (Kadalè Poḍi)	بيسن (Besan)	बेसन (Besan)	ꯕꯦꯁꯟ (Besan)	बेसन (Besan)	ঘাঠি (Ghôèṭh)	चणा रो पिसान/बेसण (Chaṇā ro Pisān/Besaṇ)
Hindi	English	Botanical name	Assamese	Bengali	Gujarati	Kannada	Malayalam	Marathi	Oriya	Punjabi	Sinhala	Tamil	Telugu	Tulu	Urdu	Konkani	Meitei	Nepali	Maithili	Rajasthani

== Fruits ==
Fruit names by various Indian languages
Hindi	English	Botanical name	Assamese	Bengali	Gujarati	Kannada	Malayalam	Marathi	Oriya	Punjabi	Sinhala	Tamil	Telugu	Tulu	Urdu	Konkani	Meitei	Nepali	Maithili	Rajasthani
फल (Phal)	Fruits		ফলবা (Fôlba)	ফলগুলো (Phôlgulo)	ફળોના (Phaḷonā)	ಹಣ್ಣುಹಂಪಲು (Haṇṇuhampalu)	പഴങ്ങൾ (Pazhangan)	फळे (Phaḷe)	ଫଳଗୁଡ଼ିକ (Phåḷåguṛikå)	ਫਲਾਂ (Phalān)	පලතුරු (Phalaturae)	பழங்கள் (Pazhangaḷ)	పండ్లు (Panḍlu)	ಪಲವಸ್ತುಲು (Palavastulu)	(Phal)	फळा (Phaḷā)	ꯎꯍꯩ (Uhei)	फलहरू (Phalharū)	ফৰআৰু (Fôrāru)	बाणच/फळां (Bāṇach/Phaḷā̃)
कच्चा आम (Kacchā Ām-Unripe Mango) पक्का आम (Pakka Ām-Ripe Mango)	Mango	Mangifera indica	কেঁঁচা আম (Kêsā Ām) পকা আম (Påkā Ām)	কাঁচা আম (Kãchā Ām) পাকা আম (Pākā Ām)	કાચી કેરી (Kāchi Keri) પાકી કેરી (Pāki Keri)	ಮಾವಿನ ಕಾಯಿ (Māvina Kāyi) ಮಾವಿನ ಹಣ್ಣು (Māvina Haṇṇu)	പച്ച മാങ്ങ/മാമ്പഴം (Paccha Mānga/Māmbazham) പഴുക്കാത്ത മാങ്ങ/മാമ്പഴം (Pazhukkāttha Mānga/Māmbazham)	कच्च्या कैरी/आंबा (Kacchya Kairi/Āmbā) पिकलेेल्या कैरी/आंबा (Piklelya Kairi/Āmbā)	କଞ୍ଚା ଆମ୍ବ (Kånchā Āmbå) ପାଚିିଲା ଆମ୍ବ (Pāchilā Āmbå)	ਕੱਚਾ ਆਮ (Kaccha Ām) ਪੱਕਾ ਆਮ (Pakkā Ām)	අමු අඹ (Amu Amba) ඉදුණු අඹ (Iduṇu Amba)	பழுக்காத மாங்காய்/மாம்பழம் (Pazhakkātha Māngkai/Māmbazham) பழுத்த மாங்காய்/மாம்பழம் (Pazhattha Māngkai/Māmbazham)	మామిడి కాయ (Māmiḍi Kāya) మామిడి ప౦డు (Māmiḍi Pānḍu)	ಕುಕ್ಕುದ ಕಾಯ್/ಕುಕ್ಕು ಕಾಯ್ (Kukkuda Kāy/Kukku Kāy) ()	(Kachā Ām) (Pakkā Ām)	आंबो (Āmbo)	ꯍꯥꯌꯅꯧ ꯃꯦꯇꯄꯥ (Heinou Metpā) ꯍꯥꯌꯅꯧ ꯃꯍꯤ (Heinou Mahi)	काचो आंप (Kācho Ānp) पाको आंप (Pāko Ānp)	কাচ আম (Kāch Ām) পাকল আম (Pākôl Ām)	काचो आंबो/काची केरी (Kācho Āmbo/Kāchi Keri) पाको आंबो/पाकी केरी (Pāko Āmbo/Pāki Keri)
अमरूद (Amrūd)	Guava	Psidium guajava	মধুৰিআম (Modhuriām)	পেয়ারা (Peyārā)	જામફળ (Jamphaḷ)	ಸೀಬೆ ಹಣ್ಣು (Sībe Haṇṇu) / ಪೇರು ಹಣ್ಣು (Pēru Haṇṇu)	ആലക്ക പഴം/പേരയ്ക്ക (Ālakka Pazham/Perakka)	पेरू (Peru)	ପିଜୁଳି (Pijuḷi)	ਅਮਰੂਦ (Amrūd)	පේර (Pēra)	கொய்யா (Koyyā)	జామి కాయ (Jāmi Kāyi-unripe) జామి పండు (Jāmi Panḍu-ripe)	ಪೇರಲೆ (Perale)	(Amrūd)	पेर (Per)	ꯄꯨꯡꯊꯣꯟ (Punghthon)	अंबा (Ambā)	লতাম (Lôtām)	जांमफळ (Jā̃mphaḷ)
अनन्नास (Anannās)	Pineapple	Ananas comosus	আনাৰস (Ānārôx)	আনারস (Ānārosh)	અનાનાસ (Anānās)	ಅನನಾಸ್ (Ananās)	കൈതച്ചക്ക (Kaithachakka)	अननस (Ananas)	ସପୁରି (Såpuri)	ਅਨਾਨਾਸ (Anānās)	අන්නාසි (Annāsi)	அன்னாசி பழம்/பரங்கி தலை (Aṇṇāsipazham / Parangi Thalai)	అనాస పండు (Anāsa Panḍu)	ಪರೇಂಗಿ (Parengi)	(Anānās)	अनस (Anas)	ꯀꯤꯍꯣꯝ (Kihom)	भुईकटहर (Bhuikaṭahar)	সফৰি কটহৰ (Sôfri Kôṭhôr)	अनास (Anās)
इमली (Imli)	Tamarind	Tamarindus indica	তেতেলী (Tètèli)	তেঁতুল (Tẽtul)	આમલી/આંબલી (Āmli/Āmbli)	ಹುಣಸೆ ಹಣ್ಣು (Huṇase Haṇṇu)	വാളന്പുളി/മര പുളി (Vaḷanpuḷi/Mara Puḷi)	चिंच (Chincha)	ତେନ୍ତୁଳି (Tèntuḷi)	(Imli)	සියඹලා (Siyambalā)	புளி (Puḷi)	చింత కాయ (Chinta Kāya-Unripe) చింత పండు (Chinta Panḍu-Ripe)	ಪುಲಿ (Puli)	(Imli)	अमटाण (Amṭāṇ)	ꯃꯥꯉꯒꯦ (Mange)	तित्री (Titri)	ততৈৰ (Tôtær)	आंमली/आंबली (Ãāmli/Ãāmbli)
जंगल जलेबी/गंगा ईमली (Jungal Jalebi/Gangā Imli)	Madras thorn	Pithecellobium dulce	তেতেলী (Teteli)	জিলাপী তেঁতুল/জঙ্গলী ফল (Jilāpi Tentul/Jôngli Phôl)	ગોરક આંબલી/વખાઇ આંબલી (Gorak Āmbli/Bakhāi Āmbli)	ದೊರ ಹುಣಸೆ/ಸೀಮೆ ಹುಣಸೆ/ಇಲಾಚಿ ಕಾಯಿ/ಇಲಾಚ್-ಹುಂಚಿ ಕಾಯಿ (Dōra Huṇase/Sīme Huṇase or Ilaichi Kāyi or Ilach-hunchi Kāyi)	കൊടുകാപ്പുള്ളി (Koḍukappuḷḷi)	इलायची चिंच/विलायती चिंच (Ilaichi Chĩch/Vilayati Chĩch)	ସିମା ତେନ୍ତୁଳି/ବଙ୍କୁଲି ତେନ୍ତୁଳି/ସିମା କଇଁଆ; Sīmā Tèntuḷi/Bånkuli Tèntuḷi/Sīmā Kåĩyā)	ਜੰੰਗਲੀ ਜਲੇਬੀ/ਜੰਗਲੀ ਊਮਲੀ (Jungli Jalebi/Jungli Imli)	()	கொடுக்காப்புளி (Koḍukkappuḷi)	సీమ చింత (Sīma Chinta)	ಸೀಮ ಪುಲಿ (Simā Puli)	(Imli)	चिंस (Chĩs)			জঙ্গলী জিলেবী (Jôngli Jilebi)	घेर आंमली/गोरक आंमली (Gher Ãāmli/Gorak Ãāmli)
काजू फल (Kājū Phal)	Cashew fruit	Anacardium occidentale	কাজু ফল (Kāju Fôl)	কাজু ফল (Kāju Phôl)	કાજુ નુ ફળ (Kāju nu Phaḷ)	ಗೇರು ಹಣ್ಣು (Gēru Haṇṇu)	കശുവണ്ടിപ്പഴം/കാശുമാങ്ങ (Kashuvandi Pazham/Kashumanga)	काजूबोंड/बोंडू (Kājubonḍ/Bonḍu)	ଆମ୍ବୋଡି/ଲଙ୍କା ଆମ୍ବ (Āmboḍi/Lånkā Āmbå)	ਕਾਜੁ ਦੀ ਫਲ (Kāju di Phal)	කජු පුහුලං (Kaju Puhulam)	முந்திரி பழம் (Mundiri Pazham)	జీడి పప్పు పండు (Jīḍi Pavvu Panḍu) జీడిమామిడిపండు (Jīdi Māmiḍi Panḍu) ముంత మామిడి పండు (Munta Māmiḍi Panḍu)	ಗೋಂಕು (Gōnku)	(Kāju Phalli)	काजू फळे (Kāju Phaḷe)	ꯀꯖꯨ ꯎꯍꯩ (Kaju Uhou)	काजू फल (Kāju Phal)	কাজুক ফৰ (Kājuk Fôr)	काजू रो फळ (Kāju ro Phaḷ)
कच्चा केला (Kachchā Kelā-Plantain) पक्का केला (Pakkā Kelā/Kelā-Ripe Banana)	Plantain/Banana	Musa acuminata × balbisiana	কাচ কল (Kās Kôl) পকা কল/কল (Pakā Kôl/Kôl)	কাঁচ কলা (Kā̃ch Kôlā) পাকা কলা (Pākā Kôlā)	કાચા કેળા (Kāchā Keḷā) પાકા કેળા/કેળા (Pākā Keḷā)	ಬಾಳೆ ಕಾಯಿ (Bāḷe Kāyi) ಬಾಳೆ ಹಣ್ಣು (Bāḷe Haṇṇu)	വാഴപ്പഴം (Pazhukkattha Vāzhapazham) പഴുത്ത വാഴപ്പഴം (Pazhutta Vāzhapazham)	कच्च्या केळं/केळे (Kachchyā Keḷã/Keḷe) पिकलेल्या केळं/केळे (Piklelyā Keḷã/Keḷe)	କଞ୍ଚା କଦଳୀ (Kånchā Kådåḷi) ପାଚିିଲା କଦଳୀ (Pāchilā Kådåḷi)	ਕੱਚਾ ਕੇਲਾ (Kachchā Kelā) ਪੱਕਾ ਕੇਲਾ (Pakkā Kelā)	අමු කෙසෙල් (Amu Kesel) ඉදුණු කෙසෙල් (Iduṇu Kesel)	பழுக்காத வாழைக்காய் (Pazhakkatha Vazhaikkāi) பழுத்த வாழைப்பழம் (Pazhattha Vazhaikkāi)	అరటికాయ (Araṭi Kāya) అరటి పండు (Araṭi Panḍu)	ಬಾರೆದ ಪರ್ಂದ್ (Bāreda Parnd) ಪರ್ಂದ್ (Parndu)	(Kela)	बंगबळे केळें (Bãgbaḷe Keḷẽ) केळें (Keḷẽ)	ꯂꯥꯐꯣꯏ (Laphoi)	काचो केरा (Kācho Kerā) पाको केरा (Pāko Kerā)	কাচ কেৰা (Kāch Kerā) পাকল কেৰা (Pākôl Kerā)	काचो केळो (Kācho Keḷo) पाको केळो (Pāko Keḷo)
कच्चा नारियल (Kacchā Nāriyal) पक्का नारियल (Pakkā Nāriyal)	Tender Coconut; Ripe coconut	Cocos nucifera	কেঁঁচা নাৰিকল (Kesā Nārikôl) পকা নাৰিকল (Påkā Nārikôl)	ডাব (Ḍāb) নারিকেল (Nārikel)	લિલો/કાચી નાળીયેર (Lilo/Kāchi Nāḷiyer) પાકી નાળીયેર (Pāki Nāḷiyer)	ತೆಂಗಿನಕಾಯಿಹಸಿ ತೆಂಗಿನಕಾಯಿ (Hani Tenginakāyi) ಮಾಗಿದ ತೆಂಗಿನಕಾಯಿ (Māgida Tenginākāyi)	പച്ച നാളികേരം/തേങ്ങ (Paccha Naḷikēram/Thēnga) പഴുത്ത നാളികേരം/തേങ്ങ (Pazhuttha Naḷikēram/Thēnga)	सहाळे/गरोदरपणात नारळ (Sahāḷe/Garodarpaṇat Nāraḷ) पिकलेेल्या नारळ (Piklelyā Nāraḷ)	ପଇଡ଼ (Påiṛå) ନଡ଼ିଆ (Nåṛiā)	ਕੱਚਾ ਨਾਰੀਅਲ (Kachchā Nārial) ਪੱਕਾ ਨਾਰੀਅਲ (Pakkā Nārial)	අමු පොල් (Amu Pōl) ඉදුණු පොල් (Iduṇu Pōl)	பச்சை தேங்காய் (Pacchai Thengāi) பழுத்த தேங்காய் (Pazhattha Thengāi)	కొబ్బరి కాయ/టెంకాయ (Kobbari Kāya/Ṭenkāya) కొబ్బరి ప౦డు (Kobbari Panḍu)	ಕೊಪ್ಪರ (Koppara) ತಾರಾಯಿ (Tārāyi)	ناریل (Nāriyel)	आडसर/शियाळें (Āḍasar/Shiyāḷẽ) नारळ (Nārḷ)	ꯌꯨꯕꯤ/ꯖꯨꯕꯤ (yubi/jubi)	()	কাচ নাৰীয়ৰ (Kāch Nāriyôr) পাকল নাৰীয়ৰ (Pākôl Nāriyôr)	काचो नारेळ (Kācho Nāreḷ) पाको नारेळ (Pāko Nāreḷ)
गुंज; रत्ती (Gunj/Ratti)	Jequirity	Abrus precatorius		কুঁচ (Kũch)	ગુઁચિ (Gũchi)	ಗುಲಗಂಜಿ (Gula-ganji)	കുന്നിക്കുരു (Kuṇikkuru)	गुंज; Gunj	ନାଲି କାଇଁଚ (Nāli Kåĩchå)			Kundumaniver	గురివింద గింజ (Gurivinda Ginja)	Guruguńǰi	goonj	Gurgunjji				चिरमी (Chirmi)
लीची (Lichee)	Litchi, lychee	Litchi chinensis	লেচু/লিচু (Lesu/Lisu)	লিচু (Lichu)	લીચી (Lichī)			लिची (Lichī)	ଲିଚୁ କୋଳି (Lichu Koḷi)		ලයිචිස් (Lychees)				lichi				লুছি (Luchhi)	लीची (lichi)
	Cjinese	Euphoria longana	আচফল; Asphôl	আঁশফল; Ãshphôl							හිඹුටු Himbutu									
करोंदा Karonda	Conkerberry	Carissa carandas		করমচা/করঞ্জা (Kôromchā/Kôronjā)				करवंद (Karavãda)	କ୍ଷୀର କୋଳି/ଦୁଧ କୋଳି (Khīrå Koḷi/ Dūdhå Koḷi)	karda			వాక్కాయ వాగు కాయ/వాక్కాయ (Vāgu Kāya/Vākkāya)		karaonda	KarnDa			মৈদাকাঠ (Môidākāṭh)	करूंदो (Karũdo)
बेर (Ber)	Indian plum, Jujube	Ziziphus mauritiana/ Ziziphus jujuba	বগৰী (Bogori)	বরই/কুল (Bôroi/Kul)	(Bor)	ಬಾರಿ ಹಣ್ಣು/ಯಲಚಿ ಹಣ್ಣು (Bāri Haṇṇu/Yalachi Haṇṇu)		बोर (Bor)	ବର କୋଳି/ଗୟା ବର କୋଳି (Bårå Koḷi/Gåyā Bårå Koḷi)			எலந்த பழம்/எலந்தாய் பழம் (Elantha Pazham/Elanthai Pazham)	రేగు పండు/రేగి పాండు (Regu Panḍu/Regi Panḍu)		beri	Bor			বৈৰ (Bair)	बोरियो/बोर (Boriyo/Bor)
Carambola	Starfruit	Averrhoa carambola		কামরাঙ্গা (Kamrānga)		ಬಿಂಬಳಿ ಹಣ್ಣು (Bimbaḷi Haṇṇu)			କରମଙ୍ଗା (Kåråmångā)	කාමරංකා (Kāmarangkā)			కర్మరంగ (Karmaraṅga)		Karbonlan				()	करमंळ/कमरख (Karmãḷ/Kamrakh)
बिलिंबी Bilimbi	Bilimbi	Averrhoa bilimbi		বিলিম্বি Bilimbi			Bilimbi				බිලිං Biling		Bilimbi Kaayalu		bilam	Bimblan				बिलिंबी (Bilimbi)
जामुन Jamun	Jambul / Jamun	Syzygium cumini	জাম (Zām)	জাম (Jām)	(Jambu)	ನೇರಳೆ ಹಣ್ಣು (Nēraḷe Haṇṇu)		जांभुळ (Jā̃mbhuḷ)	ଜାମୁ କୋଳି (Jāmu Koḷi)		මාදං (Mādam)	நேவர் பழம் (Nēvar Pazham)	నేరేడు పండు (Nērēḍu Panḍu)		جا من	Jamblan			()	जांमुण (Jā̃muṇ)
	Malabar plum	Syzygium jambos		গোলাপ জাম; Golap Jam			ജാമ്ബയ്ക്ക		ଜାମୁରୋଳ/ଜାମ୍ବୁରୋଳ (Jāmuroḷå/Jåmburoḷå)		පිනි ජම්බු Pini Jambu			siru naver pazham	Jaam					काळां जांमुण (Kāḷā̃ Jā̃muṇ)
		Syzygium samarangense									ජම්බු Jambu									
	Rose apple			জামরুল; Jamrul				जाम	Jamba/ Golap Jamu				Jambuneredu Pandu (జంబునేరేడుపండు)		jaam / gulabi jaam	Jaamb				
कैथा बेल/कबीत (Kaithā Bel/Kabīt)	Wood apple/ Curd Fruit	Limonia acidissima		কৎ বেল (Kôt Bel)	Kothu	ಬೇಲದ ಹಣ್ಣು (Bēlada Haṇṇu)		कवठ (Kavaṭh)	କଇଁଥ (Kåĩthå)		දිවුල් (Divul)	கூவிளம் (Kūvilam)	వెలగ ప౦డు (Velaga Panḍu)		gorakamli / wood apple					कैथे (Kaithe)
बेल (Bel) Bilva	Bael, Wood apple	Aegle marmelos	বেল (Bèl)	বেল (Bel)		ಬೇಲದ ಹಣ್ಣು (Belada Haṇṇu)	കൂവളം Koovalam	बेलफळ (Belaphaḷ)	ବେଲ (Belå)		බෙලි Beli	கூவிளம் koovilam, வில்வ மரம் Vilva Maram	మారేడు ప౦డు (Maredu Pandu)		wood apple					बील/बीलौ (Bil/Bilo)
				টেপারি Ṭepari																
	Mircocos paniculata	Mircocos paniculata		পিছন্দি Pichhondi					Tooth Koli											
अमड़ा Amada	Hog plum	Spondias mombin		আমড়া (Āmṛā)				बोर; Bor	ଆମ୍ବଡ଼ା (Āmbåṛā)		ඇඹරැල්ල Amberalla				ambada	Ambade				अमड़ो (Amṛo)
आँवला (Āãvalā)	Indian gooseberry	Phyllanthus emblica	আমলসী (Āmloxi)	আমলকী (Āmloki)	a mbala	ನೆಲ್ಲಿ ಕಾಯಿ/ ಗುಡ್ದದ ನೆಲ್ಲಿ (Nelli Kāyi/Guḍḍada Nelli)	നെല്ലിക്ക (Nellikka)	Āwḷā आवळा	ଅଁଳା କୋଳି (Ãḷā Koḷi)		නෙල්ලි Nelli	nellikkai /நெல்லிக்காய்	ఉసిరికాయ Usiri/usuru kaya నెల్లికాయ nellikaya ||nelli||aamla || AvaLe || || || || आंवळो (Āãvaḷo)							
Tari	Toddy palm/ Ice-apple	Borassus flabellifer	তাল; Tal	তাল; Tal		ತಾಟಿನುಂಗು / ಹಣೆ ಬೆಂಡ (Thati Nungu / Hane Benda)	പന നൊന്ഗ് (Pana Nungu)	ताडगोळा Taadgoḷa	ତାଳ; Tala		තල් Thal	நொங்கு Nungu/ panampalam	Ice Apples: తాటి ముంజలు (Thaati Munjalu), Palmyra Fruit: తాటికాయ		taar gola	IrrvoL				ताड़गोळो (Tāṛgoḷo)
खजूर Khajoor	Date (fruit)	Phoenix dactylifera	খেজুৰ (Khezur)	খেজুর (Khejur)	(Khajūr)	ಖರ್ಜೂರ (Kharjūra)	ഈത്തപഴം/ഈണ്ടപഴം (Ēttapazham/Eenḍapazham)	खजूर; Khajur	ଖଜୁରି (Khåjuri)		රට ඉඳි (Raṭa Indi)	பேரீச்சம் பழம் (Perichcham Pazham)	ఖర్జూరపండు/ఖర్జూరం/ పేరీఁత పండు Kharjuramu/ Paereetha pandu Wild/silver date: ఈఁతపండు		khajoor	Kajoor			(Kh)	खजूर; Khajur
अँजीर Anjeer	Fig	Ficus carica		ডুমুর; Ḍumur	Anjeer	ಅಂಜೂರ (Anjoora)		अंजीर; Anjir	ଡିମିରି Dimiri		දිඹුල් Dimbul	அத்திப் பழம் (atthip palam)	అత్తి పండు (Atthi pandu)		anjeer					अँजीर (Anjīr)
अँगूर Angoor	Grape	Vitis vinifera	আঙুৰ; Angur	আঙ্গুর; Anggur	(Dhraksh)	ದ್ರಾಕ್ಷಿ (Drākshi)	മുന്തിരിങ്ങ, മുന്തിരി (Munthiringa / Munthiri)	द्राक्ष; Drāksha	ଦାକ୍ଷ/ଅଙ୍ଗୁର କୋଳି (Dākhyå/Ångurå Koḷi)		මිදි (Midi)	திரக்ஷாய் (Drātshai)	ద్రాక్ష పండు (Drāksha Panḍu)		angoor	Drakche				दाख (Dākh)
जैतून Jaitoon	Olive	Olea europaea	জলপাই/ জলফাই; Zôlpai/ Zôlphai	জলপাই; Jôlpai			Oleev Kaya		ଅଲିଭ୍ Olive		රට වෙරළු Rata Veralu	ஆலிவ் olive	జైతూన (jaitūna)		zaitoon					जैतून (Jaitūn)
शहतूत Shahtoot	Mulberry				Shetur			तुती Tutee			මල්බෙරි Malberi		కంబళిపండు Kambalipandu		shehtoot					सैतूत (Saitūt)
कोकम Kokum	Kokum	Garcinia indica		তিন্দু/তিন্দুক; Tindu/ Tinduk				कोकम	କୋକୁମ; Kokum		මැන්ගුස් Mangus	மங்குசுத்தான்	కోకుమ్ Kokum		Kokum	Binda				कोकम (Kokam)
मोसम्बी Mosambi/ मुसम्बी Musambi	Orange, Indian green / Sweet lime	Citrus aurantifolia	নেমুটেঙা Nemutênga	লেবু Lebu	Mosambi	ಲಿಂಬೆ ಹಣ್ಣು (Limbe Hannu)	ചെറുനാരങ്ങ (Cheru Naranga / Naranga)	मोसंब; Mosamba	ଲେମ୍ବୁ/କାଗେଜୀ ଲେମ୍ବୁ Lembu/ Kageji Lembu		දෙහි Dehi	எலுமிச்சை காய் elimichchai kai	బత్తాయి పండు (Baththayi pandu)		Mosami	Mosumbi				मौसमी (Mosami)
संतरा (Sãtarā)	Orange	Citrus sinensis	কমলা (Kômôlā)	কমলা (Kômla)	સંતરા (Sãtrā)	ಕಿತ್ತಳೆ ಹಣ್ಣು (Kittaḷe Haṇṇu)	മധുരനാരങ്ങ (Mathura Naranga)	संत्रे (Sãtre)	କମଳା ଲେମ୍ବୁ (Kamåḷā Lembu)		දොඩම් (Doḍami)	கமலா நரந்தம் பழம் (Kamalā/Naratham Pazham)	కమలాపండు (Kamalā Panḍu)/ కిచ్చిలిపండు (Kichchili Panḍu)		sangtaraa	Santra			সঁতোলা (Sômtolā)	संतरो (Sãtro)
नारंगी Narãgi	Tangerine	Citrus tangerina		মালটা Malṭa	નારંગી Naarangi	ಮೊಸಂಬಿ ಹಣ್ಣು (Mosambi Hannu)			Kandhia/ Karuna		නාරං Naaran	நரந்தம் பழம் narantham pazaham	నారింజపండు Naarinja pandu		naarangi	Mosumbi				नारंगी (Nārãgi)
चकोतरा Chakotara	Pomelo			বাতাবি লেবু		ಚಕ್ಕೋತ ಹಣ್ಣು						பப்ளிமாஸ் (bablimaas)	ప౦పర పనస Pampara panasa		popnees	Torenj				बिजोरो (Bijoro)
	Grapefruit			জাম্বুরা Jambura		ಚಕೊತ ಹಣ್ಣು (ChakoTa Hannu)		पपनस; Papanas	ବାତାପି Batapi		ජම්බෝල Jambola		పంపరపనస (Pamparapanasa)	sakkare kanchi	grapefruit					चकोतरो (Chakotaro)
चीकू (Chikū)	Sapodilla	Manilkara zapota	চিকু (Siku)	সপেটা/সফেদা/সবেদা (Sôpeṭa/Sôfeda/Sôbeda)	ચિકુ (Chiku)	ಸಪೋಟ ಹಣ್ಣು / ಚಿಕ್ಕು ಹಣ್ಣು (Sapoṭa Haṇṇu/Chikku Haṇṇu)	ചിക്കു (Chikku)	चिक्कू (Chikku)	ସପୋଇତା/ସପୋଟା (Sapoitā/Sapoṭā)	ਚਿੱਕੁ (Chikku)	සැපතිල්ලා (Sāpathillā)	சப்போட்டா (Sapōṭā)	సపోటా (Sapōṭā), Chiku (చీకు)	ಚಿಕ್ಕು (Chikku)	(Chīku)	चीकू (Chiku)		चीकू (Chiku)		चीकू (Chiku)
		Pouteria campechiana									රට ලාවලු Rata Lavalu									
		Chrysophyllum roxburghii									ලාවලු Lavalu									
नाशपाती (Nāshpāti)	Pear, Asian pear		নাচপতি (Nāspôti)	নাশপাতি (Nāshpāti)	નાસપાતી (Nāspāti)	ಪೇರಳೆ ಹಣ್ಣು (Pēraḷe Haṇṇu)	പിയർ പഴം (Peyar Pazham)	नासपती (Nāspāti)	ନାସପାତି (Nāsåpāti)		පෙයාස් (Peyās)	பேரி காயா (Bērikkai)	సీమ జామ (Seema Jāma) బేరి పండు (Bēri Paṇḍu)		naashpati / pear				নাসপাতি (Nāspāti)	नाख (Nākh)
				সান্তারা Shantara																
पपीता (Papītā)	Papaya	Carica papaya	অমিতা (Ômitā)	পেঁপে (Pẽpe)	પપૈયા (Papaiyā)	ಪಪ್ಪಾಯಿ ಹಣ್ಣು / ಹತ್ಯೋಡಲ ಹಣ್ಣು (Pappāyi Haṇṇu / Hatyōḍla Haṇṇu)	കർമ്മൂജ (Karammūja)	पपई (Papai)	ଅମୃତଭଣ୍ଡା (Amrutå Bhåndā)		පැපොල් (Pæpol)	பப்பாளி (Pappāḷi)	బొప్పన పండు / బొప్పాయి పండు (Bōppana Panḍu /Bōppāyi Panḍu)	gandkayi	pappeeta	Popay			পপিতা (Pôpitā)	पपीतो (Papito)
तरबूज (Tarbūj)	Watermelon		তৰমুজ (Tormuz)	তরমুজ (Tormuj)	કલિંગર (Kalĩgar)	ಕಲ್ಲಂಗಡಿ ಹಣ್ಣು / ಕರಗುಂಜಿ ಹಣ್ಣು (Kallangaḍi Haṇṇu / Karagunji Haṇṇu)	വതയ്ക്ക/ തണ്ണിമത്തന് (Vataykka/ Thaṇṇi Mathan)	कलिंगड; Kalĩgaḍ	ତରଭୁଜ (Tåråbhujå)		දිය කොමඩු (Diya Komaḍu)	தர்பூசணி (Darbūsṇi)	పుచ్చకాయ (Puchcha Kāya)	bacchangayi	tarbooz	Kaling			তৰমুজ (Tôrbuj)	मतीरो (Matiro)
रामफल (Rāmphal)	Custard apple	Annona reticulata		আতা (Ātā)	રામફળ (Rāmaphaḷ)	ರಾಮಫಲ (Rāmphala)	ആത്തചക്ക (Ātta Chakka)	रामफळ (Rāmphaḷ)	ରାମଫଳ (Rāmåphåḷå)		වැලි අනෝදා /ආතා (Væli Anōdā/Ātā)	ராமா பழம் (Rāmā Pazham)	రామ పండు (Rāma Panḍu)		ramphal				আত্তা (Āttā)	रामफळ (Rāmphaḷ)
शरीफा (Sharīfā) / सीताफल (Sitāphal)	Sugar apple / Custard apple	Annona squamosa		শরিফা (Shorifā)	સીતાફળ (Sitāphaḷ)	ಸೀತಾಫಲ (Sītāphala)	സീതപ്പഴം (Sītappazham)	सिताफळ (Sitāphaḷ)	ଆତ/ସୀତାଫଳ (Ātå/Sitāphåḷå)		අනෝදා/ආතා (Anōdā/Ātā)	சீதா பழம் (Sitā Pazham)	సీతా పండు (Sītā Panḍu)		shareefa	seetaPoL			শৰিফা (Shôrifā)	सीताफळ (Sītāphaḷ)
अनार (Anār)	Pomegranate	Punica granatum	ডালিম (Dālim)	বেদানা/ডালিম (Bedānā/Ḍālim)	દાડમ (Dāḍam)	ಡಾಳಿಂಬ್ರಿ (Daḷimbri) / ದಾಳಿಂಬೆ (Dāḷimbe)	മാതളനാരങ്ങ (Mātaḷnārangam)	डाळिंब (Ḍāḷĩmba)	ଡାଳିମ୍ବ/ବେଦନା (Ḍāḷimbå/Bedånā)		දෙළුම් (Delum)	மாதுளை (Māduḷai)	దానిమ్మ ప౦డు (Dhānimma Panḍu)		anaar	Dalimb			ডাৰিম (Ḍārim)	दाड़म (Dāṛam)
सेब (Seb)	Apple	Malus domestica	আপেল (Āpel)	আপেল (Āpel)	સફરજન (Safarjan)	ಸೇಬಿನ ಹಣ್ಣು (Sēbina Haṇṇu)	ആപ്പിള് (Āppiḷ)	सफरचंद (Sapharchãd)	ସେଓ (Sèu)		ඇපල් (Apal)	குமளி / ஆப்பிள் / அரத்திப்பழம் (Kumaḷi/Āppiḷ/Aratti Pazham)	సీమరేగు (Sīma Rēgu)		seb	Appal			সেব (Seb)	सेंव/सफरजन (Sẽv/Safarjan)
Kharbooja	Cantaloupe, musk melon			Phuti ফুটি	Teti	Kekkarikke Hannu		टरबूज/चिबूड; Ṭarbooj/Chibooḍ			කොමඩු Komadu	Keerini pazham	Karbooja Pandu (కర్బూజపండు) Kasturi Karbooja Pandu (కస్తూరికర్బూజపండు) (కిర్నికాయి) Kirinikaya							खरबूजो/बड़बूजो (Kharbujo/Baṛbujo)
Makkhanphal	Avocado, butter fruit	Persea americana									අලි ගැට පේර Ali Geta Pera		వెన్న ప౦డు Venna Pandu							माखणफळ (Mākhaṇphaḷ)
Aaroo	Peach	Prunus persica											ఆడు పండు(aadu pandu)							आड़ू (Aṛū)
Aloo-bukhaara	Plum	Prunus prunus		Jorda Alu জরদালু	Alu			अलूबुखार; Alubukhar					Alpagoda pandu							आलूबुखारो (Ālubukhāro)
Zard-aloo	Apricot	Prunus armeniaca		Aprika আপরিকা				जर्दाळू Jardāḷoo					jaldarupandu జల్దరుపండు							खूबानी/जरदाळू (Khūbani/Jardāḷu)
रसभरी (Rasbhari)	Raspberry	Rubus idaeus											కోరిందపండు (korindapandu)				হীংচাবী হৈ (Heingchabi Hei)	ऐसीलु (Aiselu)		
तेंदू फल / अमरफल (Tendū Phal / Amarphal)	Persimmon	Diospyros kaki	পাৰ্চিমন (Pārsimôn)	পার্সিমন (Pārsimôn)	પર્સિમોન (Parsimōn)	ಪರ್ಸಿಮನ್ ಹಣ್ಣು (Parsiman Haṇṇu)	പെർസിമൺ (Persimon)	तेंदू (Tendū)	ପର୍ସିମନ୍ (Parsimån)	ਜਪਾਨੀ ਫਲ (Japānī Phal)	පර්සිමන් (Parsiman)	சீமை பனிச்சை (Seemai Panichai)	తునికి పండు (tuniki pandu), తేన్దిపండు (tendu pandu)	ಪರ್ಸಿಮನ್ (Parsiman)	(Tendū)	पर्सिमन (Parsiman)	ꯄꯔꯁꯤꯃꯟ (Parsimon)	हलುವಾಬೇದ (Haluwābeda)	तेंदू (Tendū)	तेंदू (Tendū)
स्ट्रॉबेरी (Strawberry)	Strawberry	Fragaria × ananassa	ষ্ট্ৰবেৰী (Strobērī)	স্ট্রবেরি (Strobēri)	સ્ટ્રોબેરી (Strōbērī)	ಸ್ಟ್ರಾಬೆರಿ (Strāberi)	സ്ട്രോബെറി (Strōberi)	स्ट्रॉबेरी (Strŏbērī)	ଷ୍ଟ୍ରବେରୀ (Stråberī)	ਸਟ੍ਰਾਬੇਰੀ (Strāberī)	ස්ට්‍රෝಬෙරි (Strōberi)	Semputrupazham (செம்புற்றுப்பழம்)	Tuppapandu (తుప్పపండు)	ಸ್ಟ್ರಾಬೆರಿ (Strāberi)	(Strawberry)	स्ट्रॉबेरी (Strŏbērī)	ꯍꯩꯖꯤꯅꯥꯄꯣꯠ (Heijinapot)	स्ट्रबेरी (Straberī)	स्ट्रॉबेरी (Strŏbērī)	स्ट्रॉबेरी (Strŏbērī)
चेरी (Cherī)	Cherry	Prunus avium	চেৰী (Sērī)	চেরি (Cheri)	ચેરી (Cherī)	ಚೇರಿ ಹಣ್ಣು (Chēri Haṇṇu)	ချެਰੀ (Cheri)	चेरी (Cherī)	ଚେରୀ (Cherī)	ਚੇਰੀ (Chērī)	චෙරි (Cheri)	செர்ரி பழம் (Cherri Pazham)	చేరి పండు (Chēri Panḍu) ప్రబదర పండు (prabadara pandu)	ಚೇರಿ (Chēri)	(Cherī)	चेरी (Cherī)	ꯆꯦꯔꯤ (Cheri)	चेरी (Cherī)	चेरी (Cherī)	चेरी (Cherī)
रामबुतान (Rāmabutān)	Rambutan	Nephelium lappaceum	ৰামবুটান (Rāmbuṭān)	রামবুতান (Rāmbutān)	રેમ્બুટન (Rēmbūṭan)	ರಾಂಬುಟಾನ್ (Rāmbuṭān)	റമ്പൂട്ടാൻ (Rambūṭṭān)	रामबुतान (Rāmabutān)	ରାମବୁଟାନ (Rāmabuṭāna)	ਰਾਮਬੁਤਾਨ (Rāmabutān)	රඹುටන් (Rambuṭan)	ரம்பூட்டான் (Rambūṭṭān)	రోమశ పండు / రాంబుటాన్ (Romasa Panḍu / Rāmbuṭān)	ರಾಂಬುಟಾನ್ (Rāmbuṭān)	(Rāmabutān)	रामबुतान (Rāmabutān)	ꯔꯥꯝꯕꯨꯇꯥꯟ (Rambutan)	रामबुतान् (Rāmabutān)	रामबुतान (Rāmabutān)	रामबुतान (Rāmabutān)
ड्रैगन फ्रूट / कमलम (Draigan Phrūṭ / Kamalam)	Dragon fruit	Selenicereus undatus	დްރැގަން ފުރުට් (Drægan Phuruṭ)	ড্রাগন ফল / কমলাম (Drāgôn Phôl / Kômôlām)	ડ્રેગન ફ્રૂટ / કમલમ (Ḍrēgan Phrūṭ / Kamalam)	ಡ್ರಾಗನ್ ಹಣ್ಣು (Drāgan Haṇṇu)	ಡ್ರಾಗನ್ ಹಣ್ಣು (Drāgan Haṇṇu)	ड्रॅगन फ्रूट (Drĕgan Phrūṭ)	ଡ୍ରାଗନ ଫଳ / କମଳମ୍ (Drāgană Phalå / Kamalam)	ਡ੍ਰੈਗਨ ਫਰੂਟ (Draigan Pharūṭ)	ඩ්‍රැගන් ෆෘට් (Drægan Frūṭ)	டிராகன் பழம் (Ṭirākaṉ Pazham)	డ్రాగన్ ఫ్రూట్ / పిటాయ పండు (Dragon Fruit / Pitaya Panḍu)	ಡ್ರಾಗನ್ ಹಣ್ಣು (Drāgan Haṇṇu)	(Draigan Phrūṭ)	ड्रॅगन फ्रूट (Drĕgan Phrūṭ)	ꯗ꯭ꯔꯦꯒꯟ ꯐ꯭ꯔꯨꯠ (Dragon Fruit)	ड्रागन फल (Drāgan Phal)	ड्रैगन फ्रूट (Draigan Phrūṭ)	ड्रैगन फ्रूट (Draigan Phrūṭ)
कीवी (Kīvī)	Kiwi	Actinidia deliciosa	কিৱি (Kiwi)	কিউই (Kiui)	કીવી (Kīvī)	ಕಿವಿ ಹಣ್ಣು (Kivi Haṇṇu)	kiwi (Kivi)	किवी (Kīvī)	କିୱି (Kiwi)	ਕੀਵੀ (Kīvī)	කිවි (Kivi)	கிவி பழம் (Kivi Pazham)	కివి పండు (Kivi Panḍu)/సీమ మామిడి (Seema Mamidi)	ಕಿವಿ (Kivi)	(Kīvī)	किवी (Kīvī)	ꯀꯤꯋꯤ (Kiwi)	किवि (Kivi)	कीवी (Kīvī)	कीवी (Kīvī)
डूरियन (Dūriyan)	Durian	Durio zibethinus	ডੂৰিয়ান (Dūriyan)	ডুরিয়ান (Dūriyān)	ડુરિયન (Ḍuriyan)	ಮುಳ್ಳುಹಲಸು / ಹೆಬ್ಬಲಸು (Muḷḷuhalasu / Hebbalasu)	ඩුරියන් (Duriyan)	ड्युरियन (Dyuriyan)	ଡୁରିଆନ୍ (Duriān)	ਡੂਰੀਅਨ (Dūrīan)	ඩුරියන් (Duriyan)	முள்நாறிப் பழம் (Muḷṉāṟip Paḻam)	రాజ పనస (Rāja Panasa)	ಮುಳ್ಳುಹಲಸು / ಹೆಬ್ಬಲಸು (Muḷḷuhalasu / Hebbalasu)	(Dūriyan)	ड्युरियन (Dyuriyan)	ꯗꯨꯔꯤꯌꯥꯟ (Duriyan)	डुरियन (Duriyan)	डूरियन (Dūriyan)	डूरियन (Dūriyan)
पैशन फ्रूट (Passion Fruit)	Passion fruit	Passiflora edulis	ਪੈਸ਼ਨ ਫਰੂਟ (Paishana Pharūṭ)	প্যাশন ফ্রুট (Pāshôn Phrūṭ)	પેશન ફ્રૂટ (Pēśana Phrūṭ)	ಪ್ಯಾಶನ್ ಹಣ್ಣು (Pyāśan Haṇṇu)	ഫാന്റാ പഴം / പാഷൻ ഫ്രൂട്ട് (Phāṇṭā Paḻam / Pāṣaṉ Phrūṭ)	पॅशन फ्रूट (Păśan Phrūṭ)	ପ୍ୟାସନ୍ ଫ୍ରୁଟ୍ (Pyāsan Phrut)	ਪੈਸ਼ਨ ਫਰੂਟ (Paishana Pharūṭ)	පැශන් ෆෘට් (Pæśan Frūṭ)	பேஷன் ப்ரூட் (Pēṣaṉ Prūṭ)	కృష్ణ ఫలం (Krushna Palam)	ಪ್ಯಾಶನ್ ಹಣ್ಣು (Pyāśan Haṇṇu)	(Passion Fruit)	पॅशन फ्रूट (Păśan Phrūṭ)	ꯄꯦꯁꯟ ꯐ꯭ꯔꯨꯠ (Passion Fruit)	पॅशन फ्रूट (Păśan Phrūṭ)	पैशन फ्रूट (Passion Fruit)	पैशन फ्रूट (Passion Fruit)
Hindi	English	Botanical name	Assamese	Bengali	Gujarati	Kannada	Malayalam	Marathi	Oriya	Punjabi	Sinhala	Tamil	Telugu	Tulu	Urdu	Konkani	Meitei	Nepali	Maithili	Rajasthani

== Other ==
Names by various Indian languages
Hindi	English	Botanical name	Assamese	Bengali	Gujarati	Kannada	Malayalam	Marathi	Oriya	Punjabi	Sinhala	Tamil	Telugu	Tulu	Urdu	Konkani	Meitei	Nepali	Maithili	Rajasthani
सिंघाड़ा (Singhāṛā)	Water chestnut	Trapa natans	পানী শিঙাৰী (Pāni Xingāri)	পানিফল/শিংড়া (Pāniphôl/Shingṛa)	શિંગોડા (Shingoḍa)	ನೀರಲ್ಲಿ ಬೆಳೆಯವ (Nīralli Beḷeyava)	വെള്ളാത്തിൽ കുഷി (Veḷḷattil Kushi)	शिंगाडा (Shingāḍā)	ପାଣି ସିଙ୍ଗେଡ଼ା (Pāṇi Singeṛā)	ਸਿੰਘਾੜਾ (Sinkāṛā)	()	காசா கோட்டை (Kāsā Koṭṭai)	Singada (సింగడ)		(Singhāṛā)	शिंगाडा (Shingāḍā)	ꯍꯦꯏꯀꯛ/ꯍꯥꯌꯛꯔꯥꯛ (Hei-Kak/Heikrāk)	सिंघड़ा (Singhṛa)	পাইনফল (Pāinphal)	सिंघोडो/पाणीफळ (Singhoḍo/Pāṇiphaḷ)
गन्ना/ईख (Gannā/Īkh)	Sugarcane	Saccharum barberi	কুহিয়াৰ (Kuhiyār)	আখ (Ākh)	શેરાડી (Sheraḍi)	ಖಬ್ಬು (Khabbu)	കരിമ്പ് (Karimbu)	ऊस (Ūs)	ପେଢ଼ୀ/ଆଖୁ/କୁସେର (Peṛhi/Ākhu/Kuserå)	ਗੱਨਾ (Gannā)	උක් (Uk)	கரும்பு (Karumbu)	చెఱకు గడ/చెరుకు (Cheraku/Cheruku Gaḍa)	ಕರ್ಂಬು (Karmbu)	(Gannā)	कोबु (Kobu)	ꯆꯨ (Chu)	उखु (Ukhu)	কুসিয়াৰ (Kusiyār)	सांठो/गन्नो (Sãṭho/Ganno)
Hindi	English	Botanical name	Assamese	Bengali	Gujarati	Kannada	Malayalam	Marathi	Oriya	Punjabi	Sinhala	Tamil	Telugu	Tulu	Urdu	Konkani	Meitei	Nepali	Maithili	Rajasthani

== Glossary of Vegetarian food ==
Names by various Indian languages
Hindi	English	Botanical name	Assamese	Bengali	Gujarati	Kannada	Malayalam	Marathi	Oriya	Punjabi	Sinhala	Tamil	Telugu	Tulu	Urdu	Konkani	Meitei	Nepali	Maithili	Rajasthani
शाकाहारी खाना (Shākāhāri Khānā)	Vegetarian food		নিৰামিষ খাদ্য (Nirāmih Khādyo)	নিরামিষ খাওয়া (Nirāmish Khāowā)	શાકાહારી ખોરાક (Shākāhāri Khorāk)	ಬಾಡುಣಗ ಊಟ/ಶಾಕಹರಿ ಆಹಾರ (Baḍuṇaga Ūtā/ Shākāhāri Āhara)	ശകഹാര ഭക്ഷണം (Shākāhāra Bhakshaṇam)	शाकाहारी खाद्य/आहार (Shākāhāri Khādya/Āhara)	ନିରଆଇଁଷ/ନିରାମିଷ ଖାଇବା (Niråāĩså/ Nirāmiså Khāibā)	ਸ਼ਾਕਾਹਾਰੀ ਖਾਨਾ (Shākāhāri Khānā)	නිර්මාංශ ආහාර (Niramānsa Āhara)	சைவ உணவு (Saiva Uṇavu)	శాకాహార తిండి (Shākāhāra Tinḍi)	ಶಕಹರ ವನಸ್ (Shākāhāra Vanas)	()	शाकाहारी खाद्यो (Shākāhāri Khādyo)	()	शाकाहारी खाद्य (Shākāhāri Khādyo)	শাকাহাৰী ভোজন (Shākahari Bhojan)	सागार खाणो (Sāgār Khāṇo)
पेड़ (Pèṛ)	Tree		গছ (Gôs)	গাছ (Gāchh)	બૃક્ષ/ઝાડ (Bruksh/Jhāḍ)	ಮರ (Mara)	മരം (Maram)	झाड (Jhāḍ)	ଗଛ (Gåchhå)	ਰੁੱਖ (Rukhkh)	ගස (Gasa)	மரம் (Maram)	చెట్టు (Cheṭṭu)	ಮರ (Mara)	(Darakht)	झाड (Jhāḍ)	ꯄꯥꯝꯕꯤ (Pāmbi)	रुख (Rukh)	গাছ (Gāchh)	रूंख/गाछ/झाड (Rũnkh/Gāchh/Jhāḍ)
पत्ता (Pattā)	Leaf		পাত (Pāt)	পাতা (Pātā)	પાંદનું/પર્ણ (Pā̃dnu/Parṇa)	ಎಲೆ (Il)	ഇല (Ilû)	पान (Pān)	ପତ୍ର/ପତର (Påtrå/Påtårå)	ਪੱਤਾ (Pattā)	කොළ (Kōla)	இலை (Illai)	ఆకు (Aku)	()	(Pattā)	पान (Pān)	ꯝꯅꯥ (Manā)	पात (Pāt)	পাত (Pāt)	पान/पत्तौ (Pān/Patto)
तरकारी (Tarkāri)	Curry/Dish		তৰকাৰি (Torkāri)	তরকারি (Tôrkāri)	શાક (Shāk)	ತಿಮ್ಮನ (Timmana)	കറി (Kari)	पाककृती (Pākkruti)	ତିଅଣ/ତୁଣ (Tiyåṇå/Tuṇå)	()	()	கறி (Kari)	కూర (Kūra)	()	(Khānā)	()	()	तरकारी (Tarkāri)	তিমন (Timan)	वांनगी/जीभणो (Vā̃ngi/Jibhṇo)
छिलके (Chhilke)	Veggie peels		খোলাবা (Kholābā)	খোসাগুলো (Khosāgulo)	છાલો (Chhālo)	ಸಿಪ್ಪೆಗಳು (Sippegaḷu)	തൊലികള് (Tolikaḷ)	साला (Sālā)	ଚୋପାଗୁଡ଼ିକ (Chopāguṛikå)	ਛਿਲਕੇ (Chhilke)	()	தொல்கலை (Tolgalai)	తొక్కలు (Tokkālu)	()	(Chhilke)	()	()	बोक्राहरु (Bokrāharu)	খোইচাৰু (Khôichāru)	()
रसोईघर (Rasoighar)	Kitchen		পাকঘৰ (Pākghôr)	রান্নাঘর (Rānnāghor)	રસોડું (Rasoḍu)	ಅಡಿಗೆ (Aḍige)	അടുക്കള (Aḍukkaḷa)	स्वयंपाकघर (Svayampākghar)	ରାନ୍ଧଣାଘର (Rāndhåṇāghårå) / ରୋଷେଇଘର (Roseighårå)	ਰਸੋਈ (Rasoi)	මුළුතැන්ගෙය (Mulukætgēya)	சமையலறை (Samaiyalair)	వంటగది (Panṭagadi)	()	()	कुजिन (Cuzin)	()	भान्छा (Bhānchhā)	ভনসাঘৰ (Bhônsāghôr)	पाकसाळा (Pāksāḷā)
Hindi	English	Botanical name	Assamese	Bengali	Gujarati	Kannada	Malayalam	Marathi	Oriya	Punjabi	Sinhala	Tamil	Telugu	Tulu	Urdu	Konkani	Meitei	Nepali	Maithili	Rajasthani

== See also ==
- South Asian cuisine
- List of foods
