= Luffa (disambiguation) =

Luffa is a genus of vines.

Luffa may also refer to:

- Luffa aegyptiaca, a species of plant
- Luffa acutangula, a species of flowering plant
- Luffa operculata, a species of flowering plant

== See also ==
- Luff (disambiguation)
