= Rag gourd =

Rag gourd may refer to:

- The plant genus Luffa
- Luffa aegyptiaca, a particular species of Luffa
