= Vegetable sponge =

Vegetable sponge may refer to:

- The plant genus Luffa
- Luffa aegyptiaca, a particular species of Luffa known as a sponge gourd or vegetable sponge
