= Luff =

Luff or luffing may refer to:

== People ==
- Arthur P. Luff (1855–1938), British physician and forensic scientist
- Enid Luff (1935–2022), Welsh musician, music educator, and composer
- Frederick Ernest Luff (1896–1931), American military pilot
- Harry Luff (1856–1916), American Major League Baseball player
- Jennifer D. Luff, American historian
- John N. Luff (1860–1938), American philatelist
- Matt Luff (born 1997), Canadian professional ice hockey player
- Peter Luff (born 1955), British politician
- Peter Luff (campaigner) (born 1946)
- Robyn Luff (born 1980), Canadian politician

== Other uses ==
- Lausanne Underground Film and Music Festival (LUFF), Lausanne, Switzerland
- Luff Award, awarded by the American Philatelic Society
- Luff Nunatak
- Level luffing crane, a type of crane where the jib, rather than being fixed, can be raised and lowered
- Luffing, when a sailing sheet is eased so far past trim that airflow over the surface is disrupted
- The leading edge of a sail

== See also ==
- Luffa (disambiguation)
