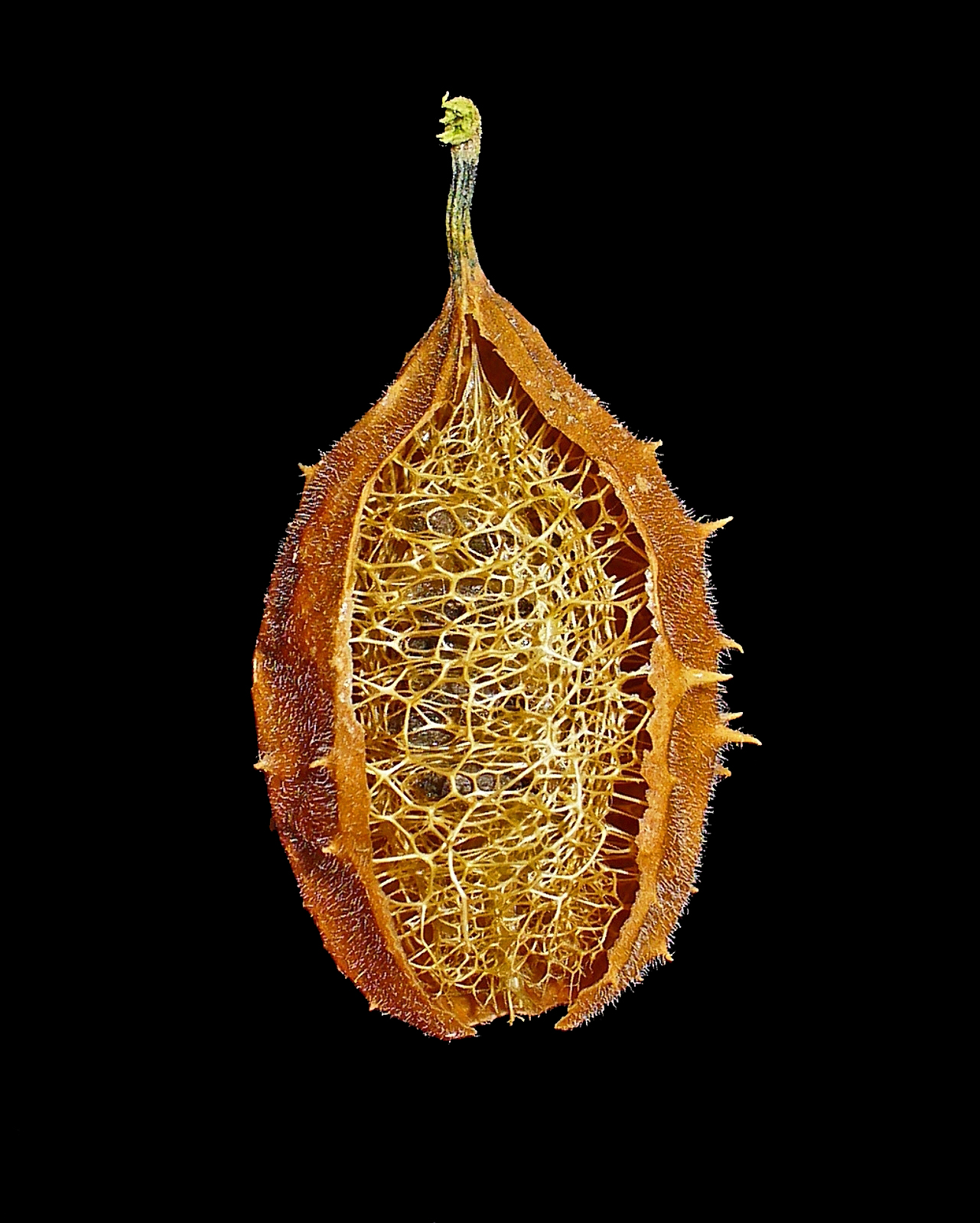
- Dried fruit, opened

Scientific classification
- Kingdom: Plantae
- Clade: Tracheophytes
- Clade: Angiosperms
- Clade: Eudicots
- Clade: Rosids
- Order: Cucurbitales
- Family: Cucurbitaceae
- Genus: Luffa
- Species: L. operculata

Binomial name
- Luffa operculata Cogn.

= Luffa operculata =

Species of flowering plant

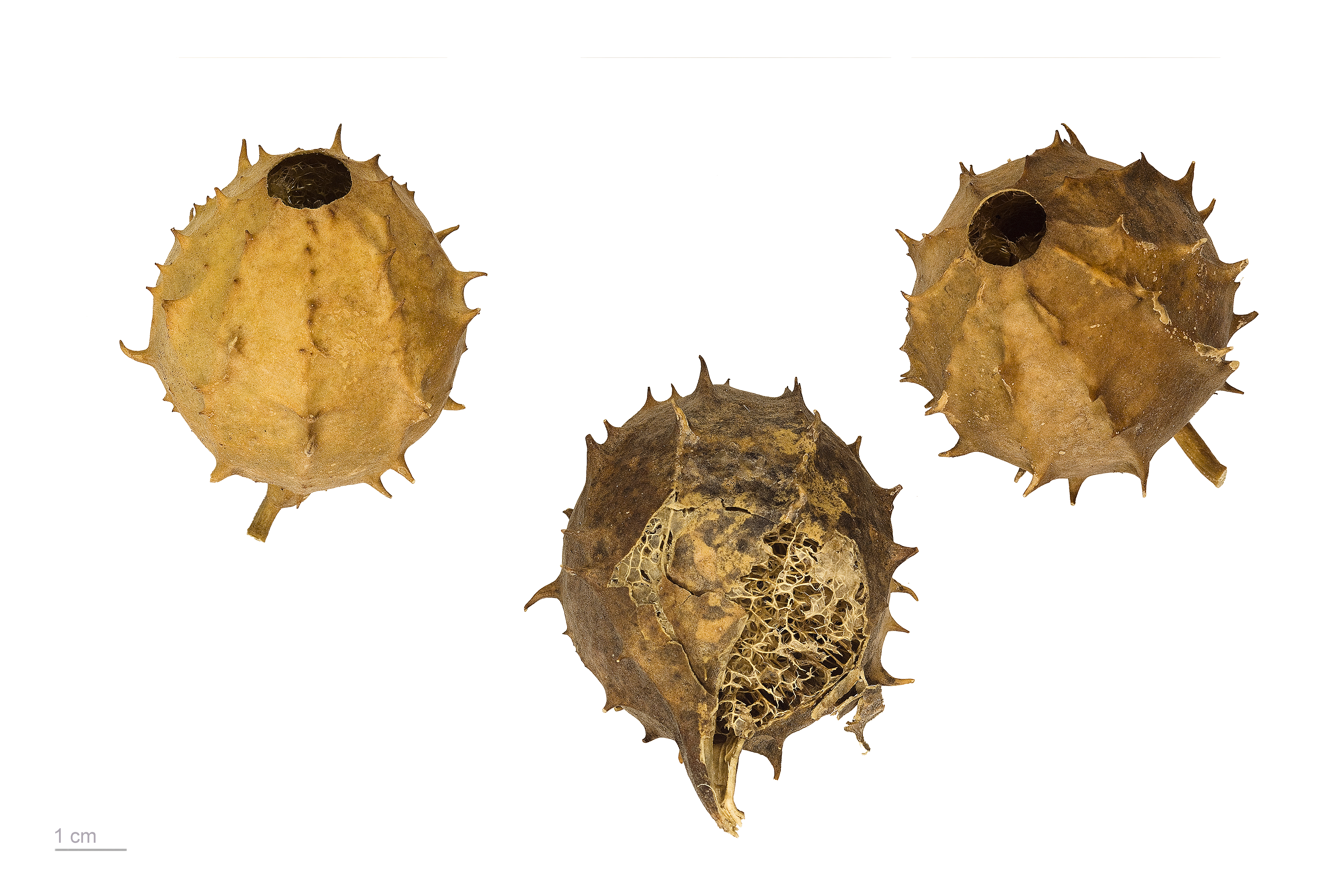
Luffa operculata - MHNT

Luffa operculata (common name, sponge cucumber, wild loofa, buchinha in Brazil or mướp xơ in Vietnamese) is a species of Luffa native to South and Central America. It is cultivated for its fruit, which when fully ripe is strongly fibrous and is used as a fibrous scrubbing sponge for household cleaning. The fruit is a capsule with spikes. The fruit is dark-brown when mature. It is also grown in gardens and yards as an ornamental plant. In colder places they can be grown indoors as a houseplant.

The species name is derived from the word, operculum, meaning "little lid." When the fruits are mature, and the seeds are ready to be dispersed, a small part of the bottom tip (blossom end) opens up. Then, the seeds fall to the ground.

Luffa is used as an herbal remedy, with some pharmacological activity found in animal tests and insufficient data proving effectiveness in humans. Its use in homeopathy is diluted many times, with insufficient material to produce any effect, and not approved by any official United States government regulatory agencies.

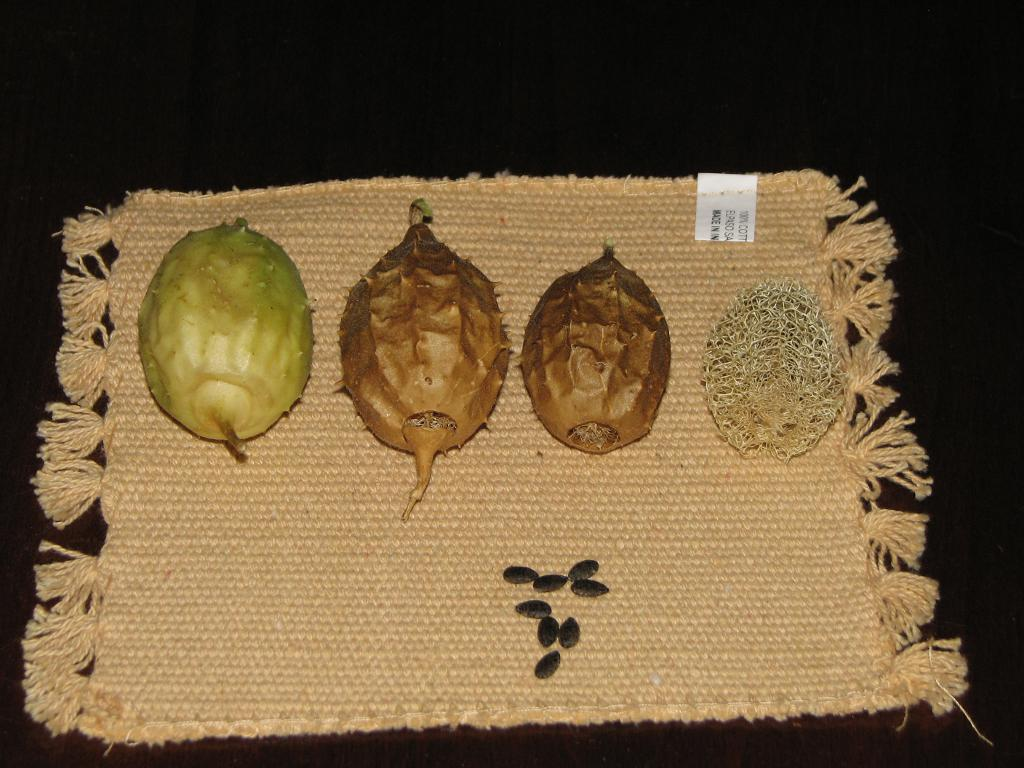
Increasing stages of maturity of Luffa operculata fruit. The seeds are also shown.
