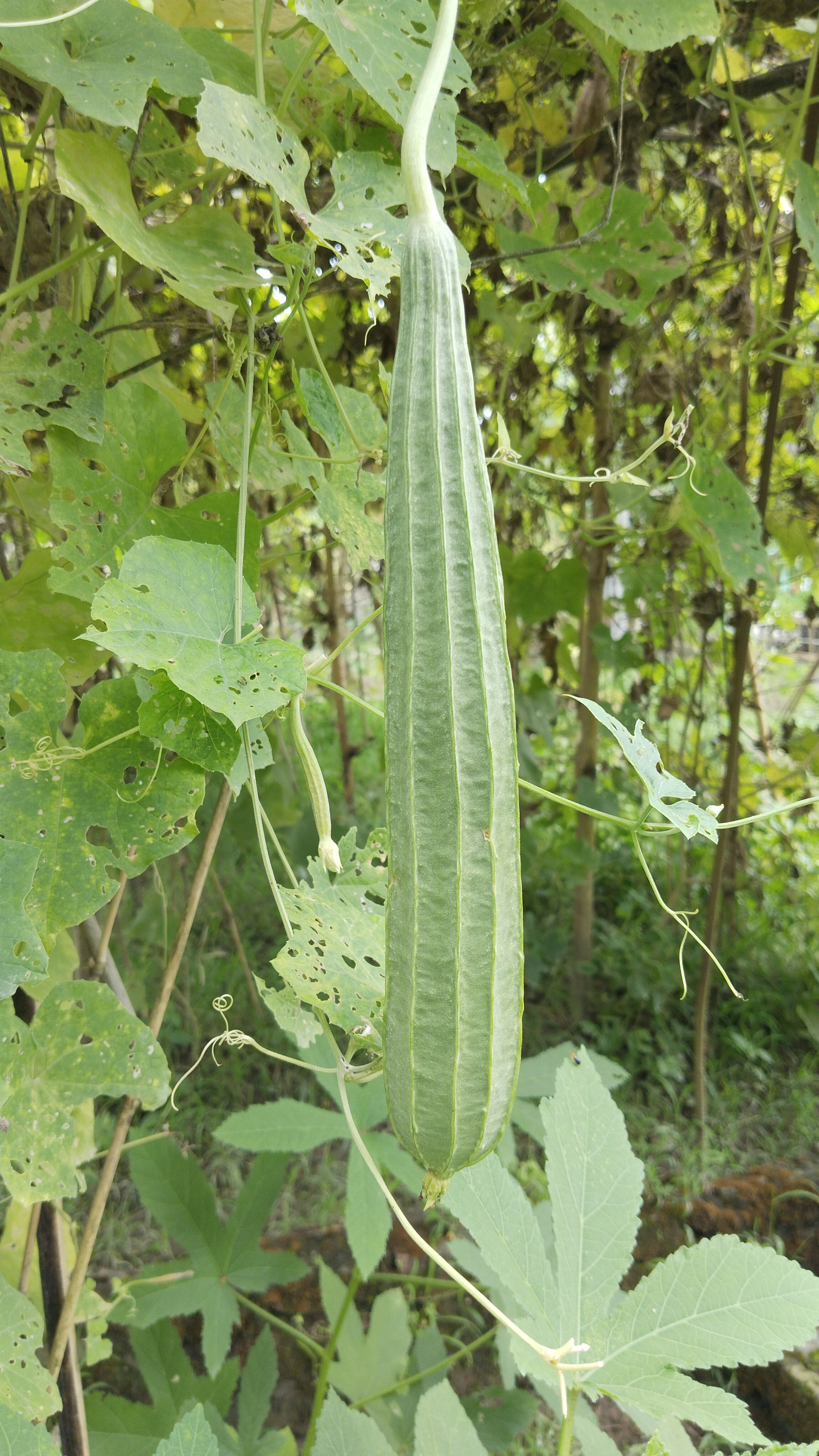

Scientific classification
- Kingdom: Plantae
- Clade: Tracheophytes
- Clade: Angiosperms
- Clade: Eudicots
- Clade: Rosids
- Order: Cucurbitales
- Family: Cucurbitaceae
- Genus: Luffa
- Species: L. acutangula

Binomial name
- Luffa acutangula (L.) Roxb.

Synonyms
- List: Cucumis acutangulus L.; Cucurbita acutangula (L.) Blume; Cucumis lineatus Bosc; Cucumis megacarpus G.Don; Cucumis operculatus Roxb.; Cucurbita campanulata D.Dietr.; Cucurbita umbellata J.G.Klein ex Willd.; Luffa amara Roxb.; Luffa cattu-picinna Ser.; Luffa drastica Mart.; Luffa fluminensis M.Roem.; Luffa foetida Cav.; Luffa forskalii Beck & F.Abel; Luffa forskalii Schweinf. ex Harms; Luffa gosa Buch.-Ham.; Luffa hermaphrodita N.B.Singh & U.C.Bhattach.; Luffa kleinii Wight & Arn.; Luffa plukenetiana Ser.; Luffa tenera Royle; Luffa umbellata (J.G.Klein ex Willd.) M.Roem.

= Luffa acutangula =

Species of flowering plant

Luffa acutangula is a cucurbitaceous vine commercially grown for its unripe fruits as a vegetable. Mature fruits are used as natural cleaning sponges. Its fruit slightly resembles a cucumber or zucchini with ridges. It is native to South Asia and has been naturalised in other regions. It is also grown as a houseplant in places with colder climates. English common English names include angled luffa, Chinese okra, dish cloth gourd, ridged gourd, sponge gourd, vegetable gourd, strainer vine, ribbed loofah, silky gourd, and silk gourd.

== Uses ==
The young fruits of some Luffa cultivars are used as cooked vegetables, pickled or eaten raw, and the shoots and flowers are sometimes also used. Like Luffa aegyptiaca, the mature fruits are harvested when dry and processed to remove all but the fruit fibre, which can then be used as a sponge or as fibre for making hats.

== Gallery ==
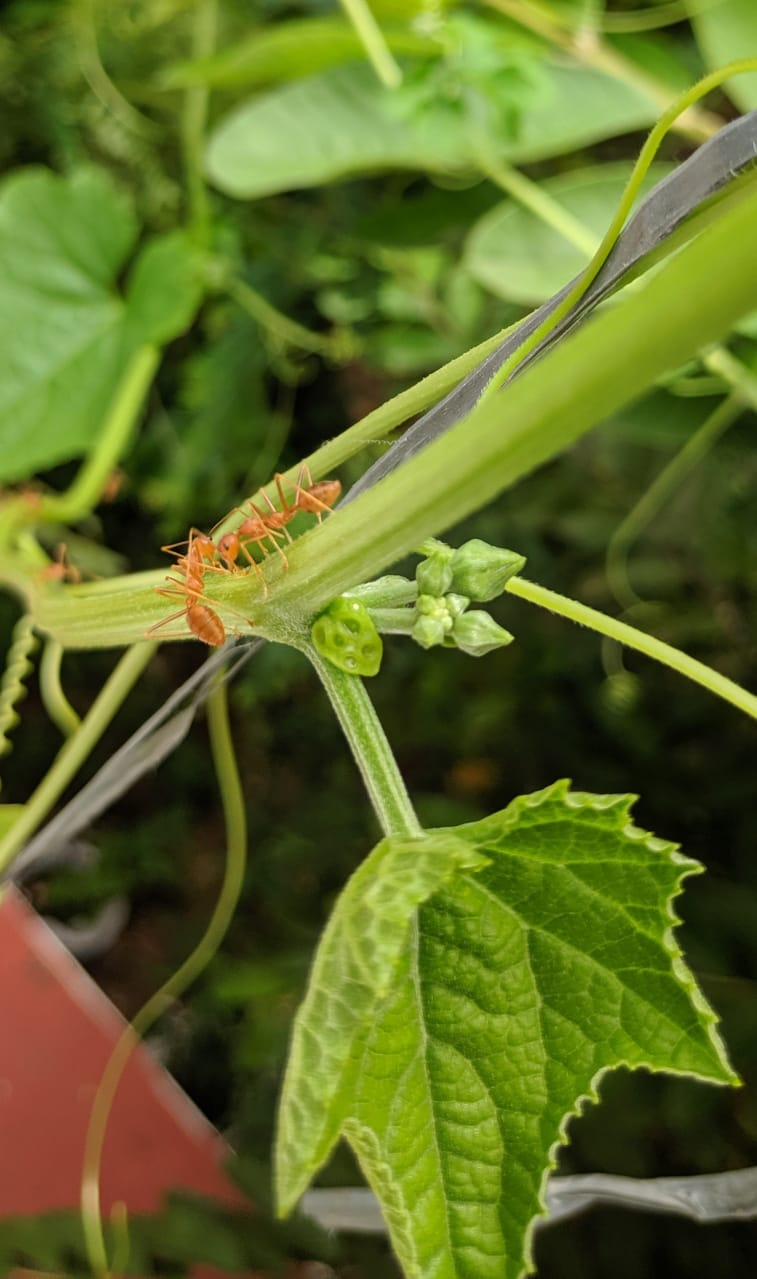
Extrafloral nectar glands with Oecophylla smaragdina ants

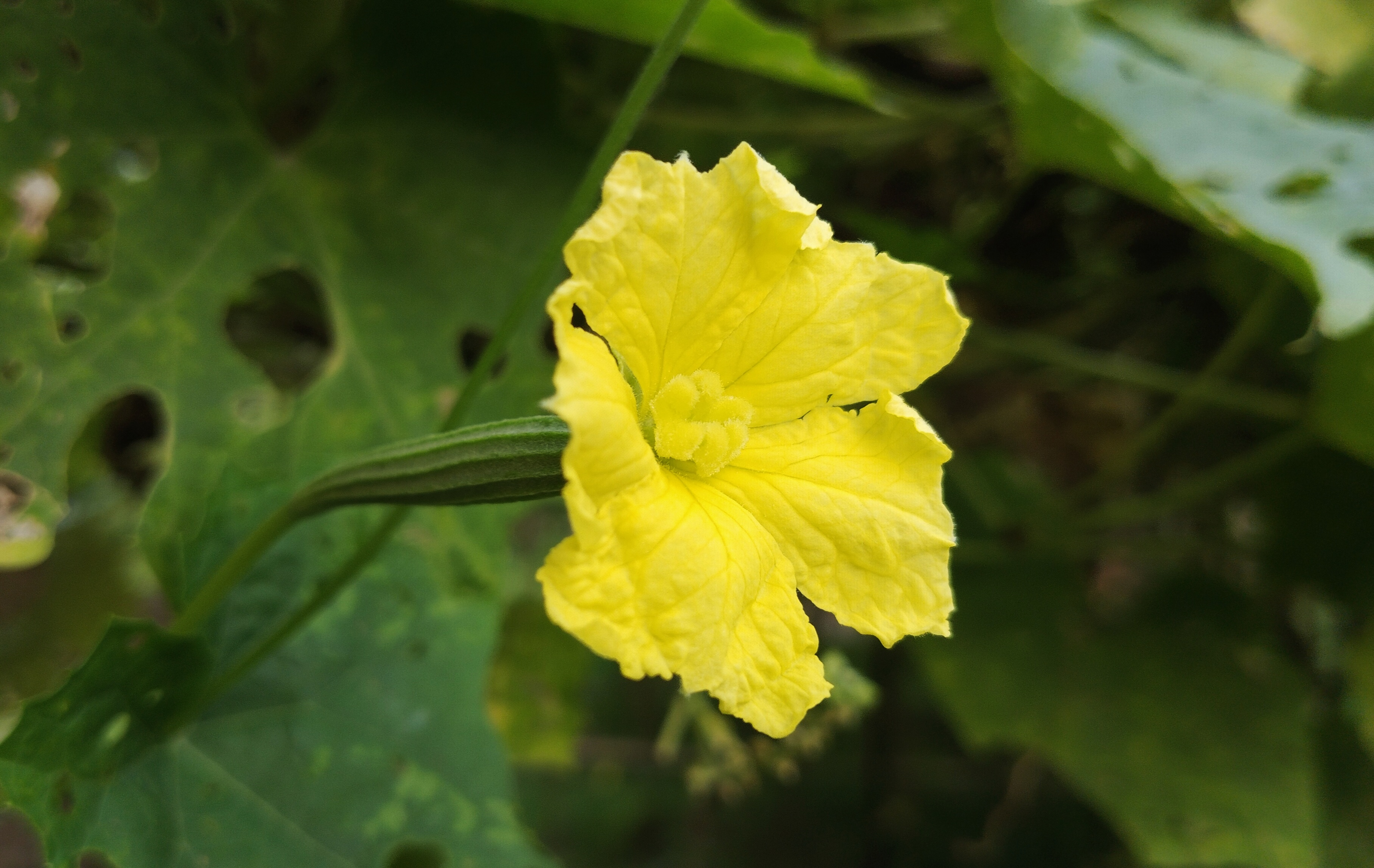
Female flower

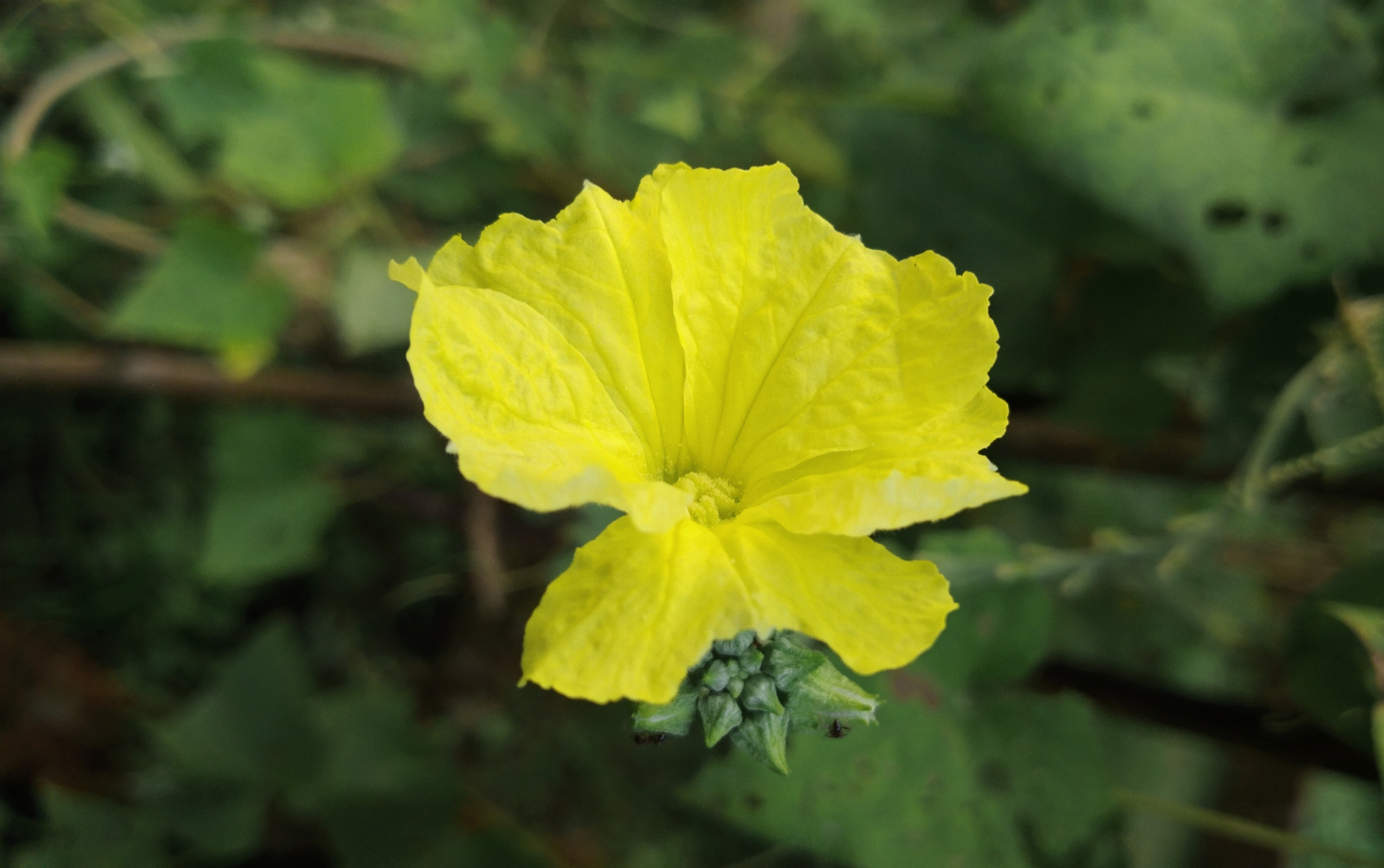
Male flower

== See also ==
- Okra
