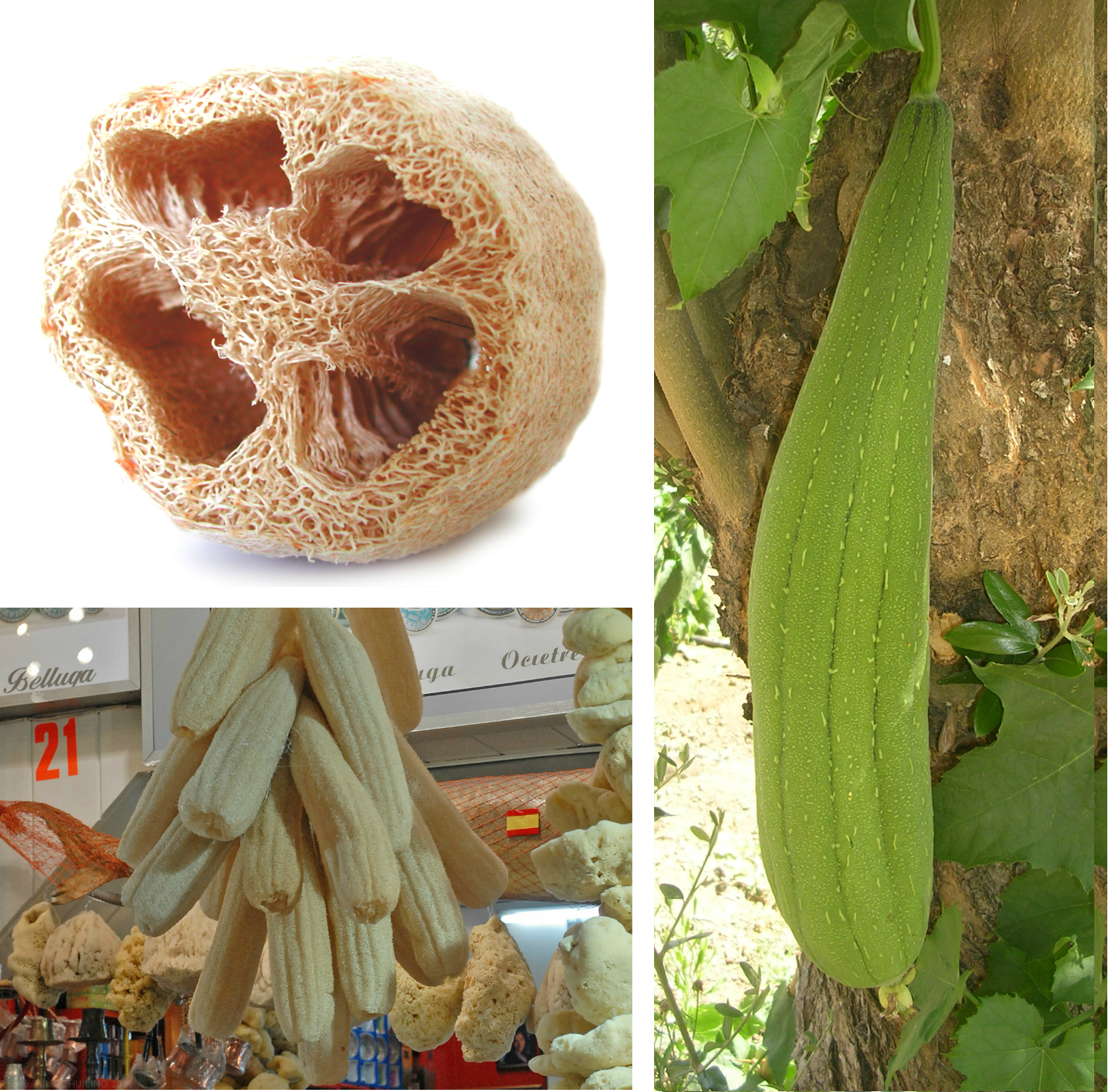
- Egyptian luffa fruit

Scientific classification
- Kingdom: Plantae
- Clade: Tracheophytes
- Clade: Angiosperms
- Clade: Eudicots
- Clade: Rosids
- Order: Cucurbitales
- Family: Cucurbitaceae
- Genus: Luffa
- Species: L. aegyptiaca

Binomial name
- Luffa aegyptiaca Mill.

Synonyms
- Cucurbita luffa hort.; Luffa cylindrica M.Roem.; Luffa aegyptica (lapsus); Luffa aegyptiaca (Mill.); Luffa pentandra Roxb.; Momordica cylindrica L.; Momordica luffa L.

= Luffa aegyptiaca =

Species of plant

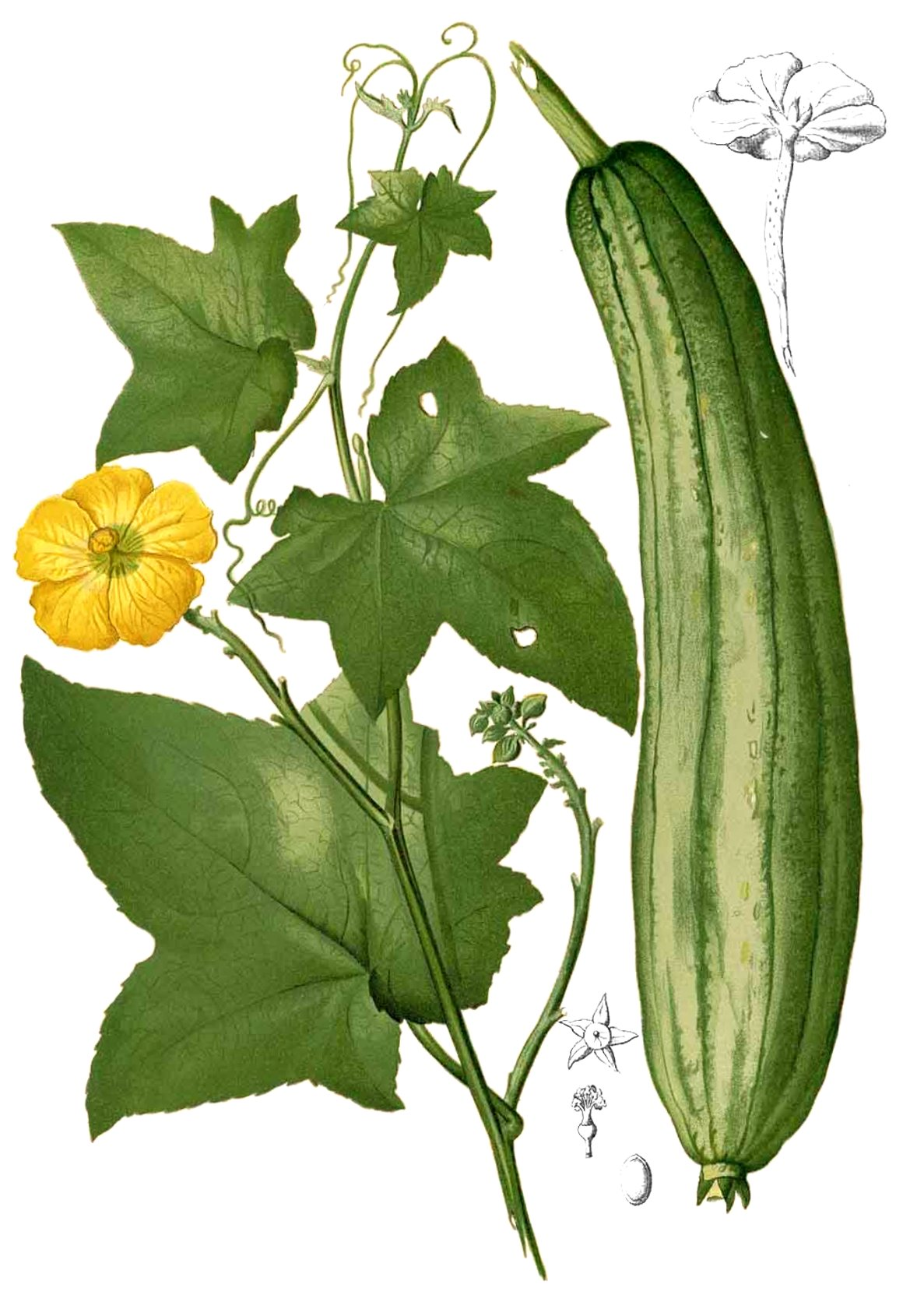
Leaves, flower and fruit of a luffa

Luffa aegyptiaca, the sponge gourd, Egyptian cucumber or Vietnamese luffa, is an annual species of vine cultivated for its fruit, native to South and Southeast Asia.

== Description ==
The three-lobed leaves are 7.5–20 centimetres (3–8 inches) wide.

The fruit, approximately 30 cm (12 in) long and maturing to brown, resembles a cucumber in shape and size.

== History ==
=== Etymology ===
The synonymous botanical specific epithet "aegyptiaca" was given to this plant in the 16th century when European botanists were introduced to the plant from its cultivation in Egypt. In the European botanical literature, the plant was first described by Johann Veslingius in 1638, who named it "Egyptian cucumber". Veslingius also introduced the name "Luffa".

== Composition ==
=== Nutrition ===
Dishcloth (towelgourd), cooked, boiled, drained, without salt
Nutritional value per 100 g (3.5 oz)
- Energy: 56 kJ (13 kcal)
- Carbohydrates: 14.34 g
- Sugars: 5.17 g
- Dietary fiber: 2.9 g
- Fat: 0.34 g
- Protein: 0.66 g
Vitamins and minerals
Vitamins	Quantity %DV^{†}
Vitamin A	260 IU
Thiamine (B1)	4% 0.046 mg
Riboflavin (B2)	3% 0.042 mg
Niacin (B3)	2% 0.26 mg
Vitamin B6	6% 0.099 mg
Folate (B9)	3% 12 μg
Vitamin C	6% 5.7 mg
Vitamin E	2% 0.24 mg
Vitamin K	1% 1.7 μg
Minerals	Quantity %DV^{†}
Calcium	1% 9 mg
Iron	2% 0.36 mg
Magnesium	5% 20 mg
Phosphorus	2% 31 mg
Potassium	15% 453 mg
Sodium	1% 21 mg
Zinc	2% 0.17 mg
- Link to USDA Database entry
- ^{†}Percentages estimated using US recommendations for adults, except for potassium, which is estimated based on expert recommendation from the National Academies.

== Varieties ==
=== Cultivars in North America ===
According to researchers in Florida, common cultivars for Luffa aegyptiaca include Smooth Boy, Smooth Beauty, and South Winner. Many other cultivars were also mentioned in the Vegetable Cultivar Description for North America List 24, 1999:

- Ba Leng Gua (ZWRM 135).—Parentage: from China. Characteristics: low yield of sponges.
- Fletcher.—Breeder: DeCourley, Missouri. Characteristics: high yield of high-quality sponges with 100 × 400-mm size.
- Hollar Luffa (13204).—Vendor: Hollar & Co. Characteristics: moderate to high yield of high-quality sponges with 97 × 428-mm size.
- Leng Si Gua (ZWRM 133).—Parentage: from China. Characteristics: high yield of moderate-quality sponges with 60 × 350-mm size.
- Lockhardt (Walters 484).—Vendor: Lockhardt Seeds. Characteristics: high yield of moderate-quality sponges with 79 × 489-mm size.
- Orol Ledden Luffa.—Vendor: Orol Ledden & Sons. Characteristics: moderate to high yield of high-quality sponges with 98 × 429-mm size.
- Pang Si Gua (ZWRM 134).—Parentage: from China. Characteristics: moderate yield of moderate-quality sponges with 100 × 430-mm size.
- Peace Luffa.—Vendor: Peace Seeds. Characteristics: moderate yield of high quality sponges with 85 × 420-mm size, late flowering.
- Pusa Chikni.—Parentage: from India. Characteristics: attractive fruit, eaten immature. Martin’s Vegetables for the Hot, Humid Tropics, 1979.
- Qing Pi Chang (ZWRM 138).—Parentage: from China. Characteristics: high yield of moderate-quality sponges with 65 × 595-mm size.
- Quan Zhou Chang Tiao Gua (ZWRM 141).—Parentage: from China. Characteristics: high yield of moderate, high-quality sponges with 50 × 180-mm size.
- Richters Luffa (S3795).—Vendor: Otto Richter and Sons Ltd. Characteristics: moderate to high yield of high-quality sponges with 98 × 431-mm size.
- Shi Ting Da Quing Pi (ZWRM 137).—Parentage: from China. Characteristics: high yield of moderate quality sponges with 60 × 540-mm size.
- Smooth Short Luffa.—Vendor: Seed Saver’s Exchange. Characteristics: fruit short, cylindrical, eaten immature (at 6” long), 90-day maturity. 1981.
- Sunrise (Walters 401).—Characteristics: moderate to high yield of moderate-quality sponges with 78 × 495-mm size.
- USA Luffa (Guatemala).—Vendor: USA Luffa Inc. Characteristics: moderate to high yield of moderate-quality sponges with 72 × 464- mm size.
- Xiang Si Gua (ZWRM 136).—Parentage: from China. Characteristics: low yield of moderate-quality sponges with 75 × 315-mm size.

== Uses ==
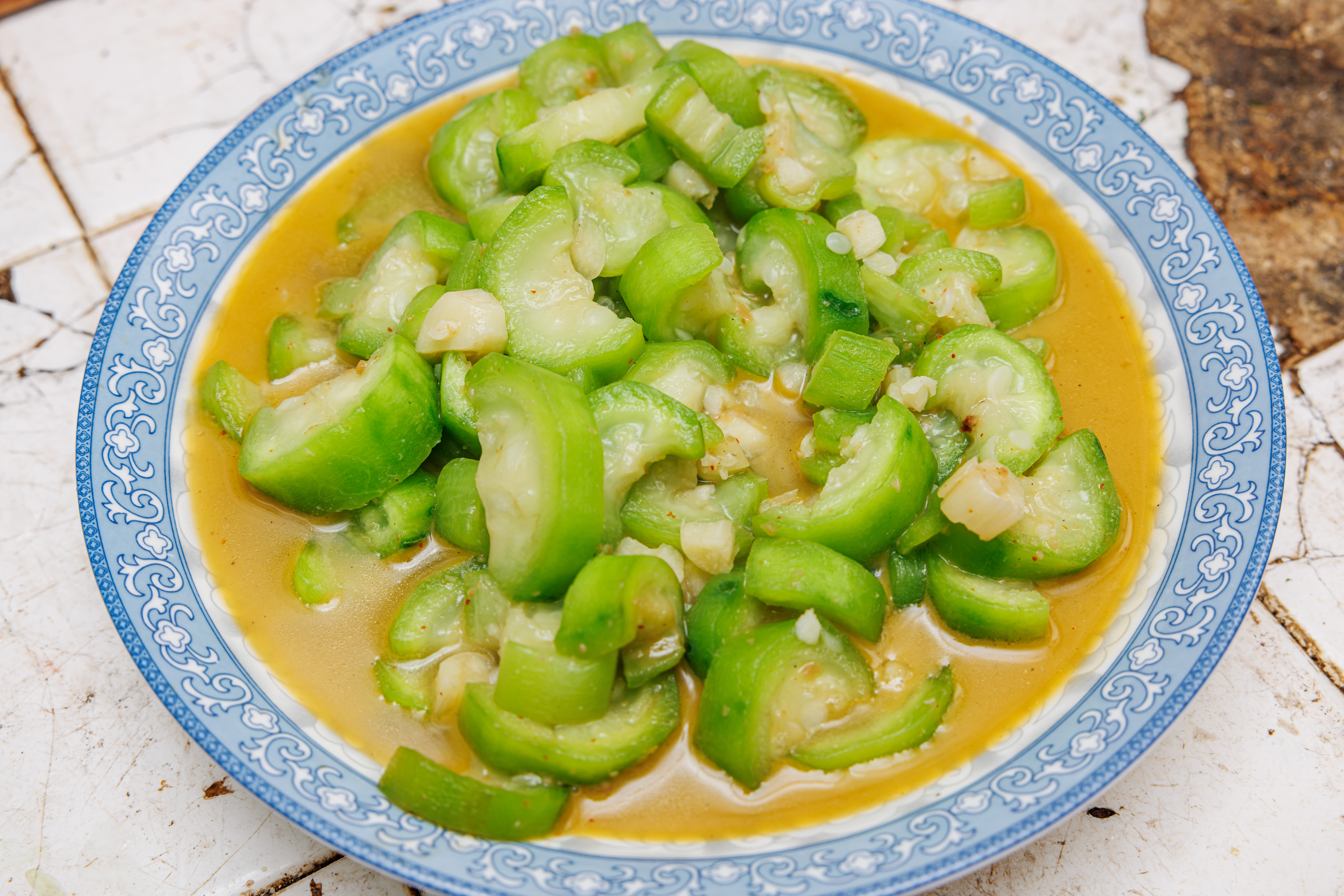
Cooked luffa

=== Culinary ===
The young fruit is eaten as a vegetable and is commonly grown for that purpose in tropical Asia. The young shoots, flowers and leaves can be cooked, and the mature seeds can be roasted for consumption.

=== Sponge ===
Unlike the young fruit, the fully ripened fruit is strongly fibrous and inedible, and is used to make scrubbing bath sponges. Due to the use as a scrubbing sponge, it is also known by the common names dishrag gourd, rag gourd, sponge gourd, and vegetable-sponge. It is also called smooth luffa to distinguish it from the ridged luffa (Luffa acutangula), which is used for the same purposes.

=== Oil extract ===
An edible oil can be extracted from the seeds. The resulting oil meal can be fed to rabbits and catfish, or used as a fertilizer.

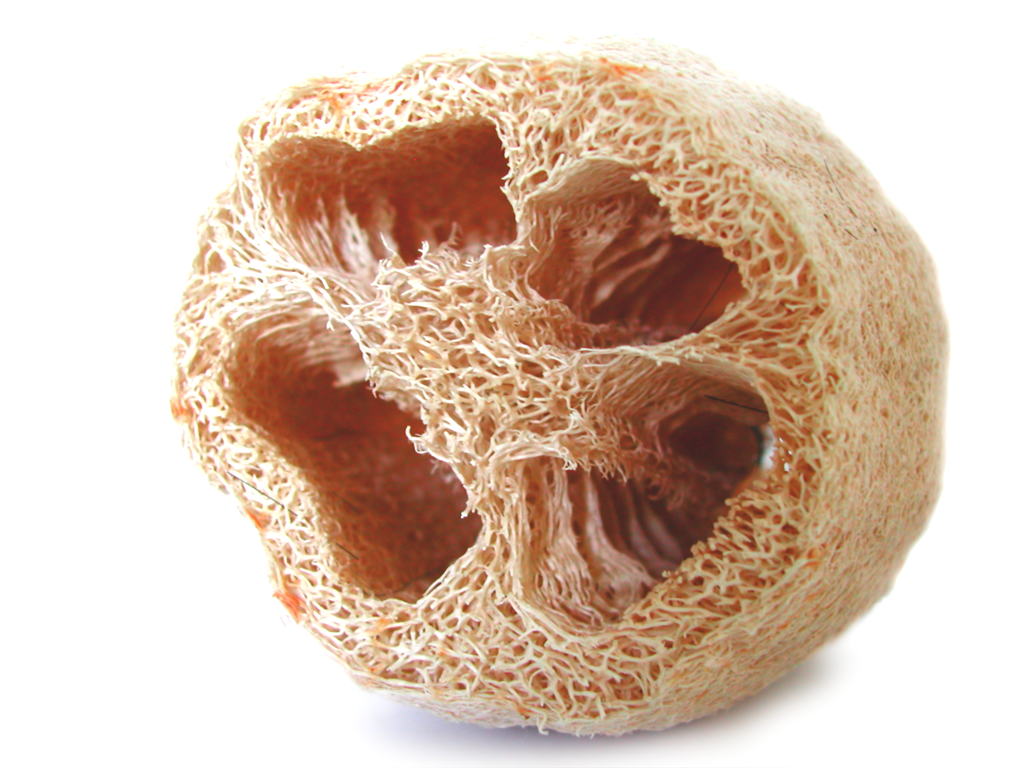
The fibrous skeleton of the fruit is used as a household scrubber. The fiber is xylem. It has semi-coarse texture and good durability.

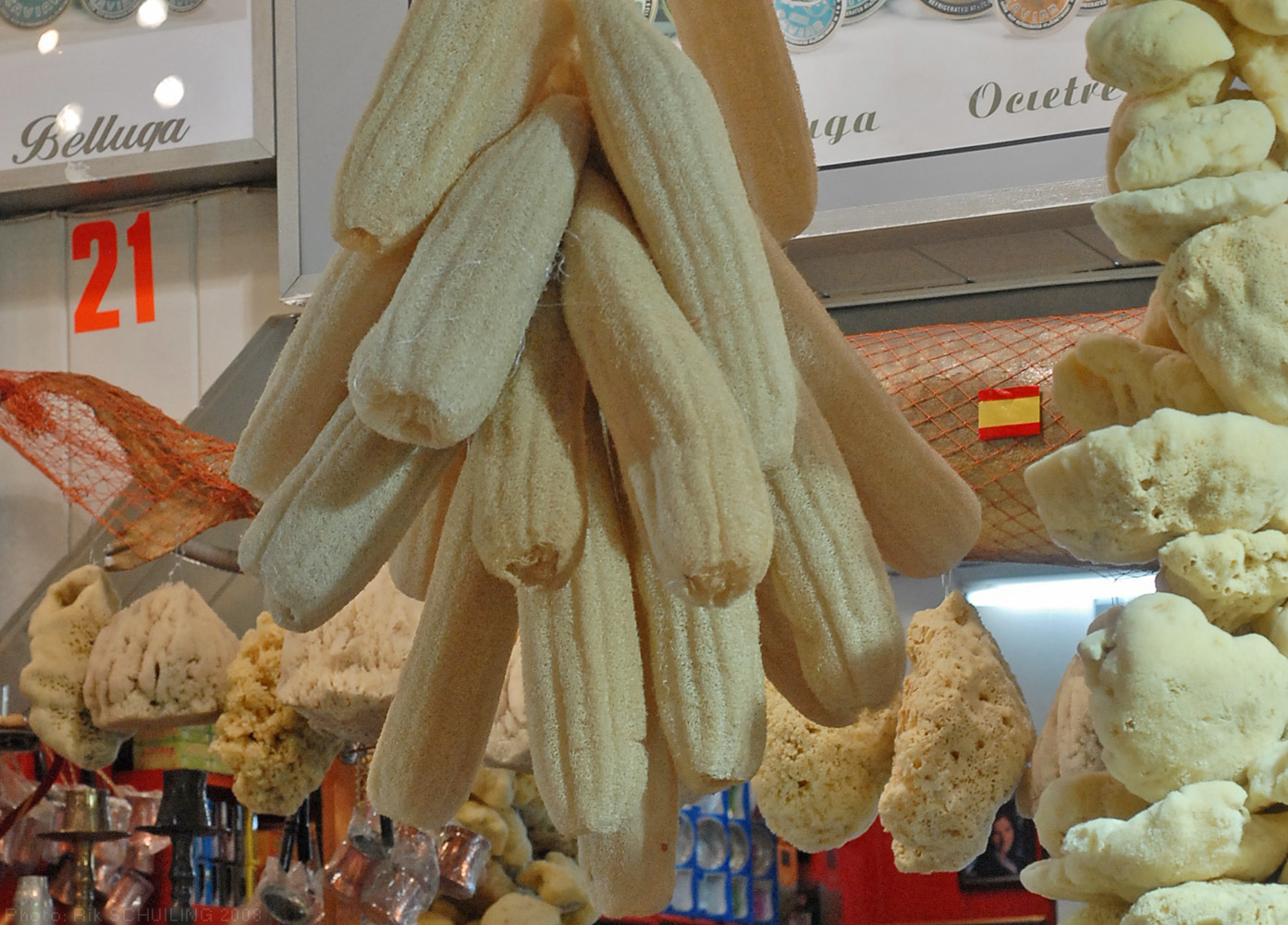
Sponges made of sponge gourd for sale alongside sponges of animal origin (Spice Bazaar in Istanbul, Turkey).

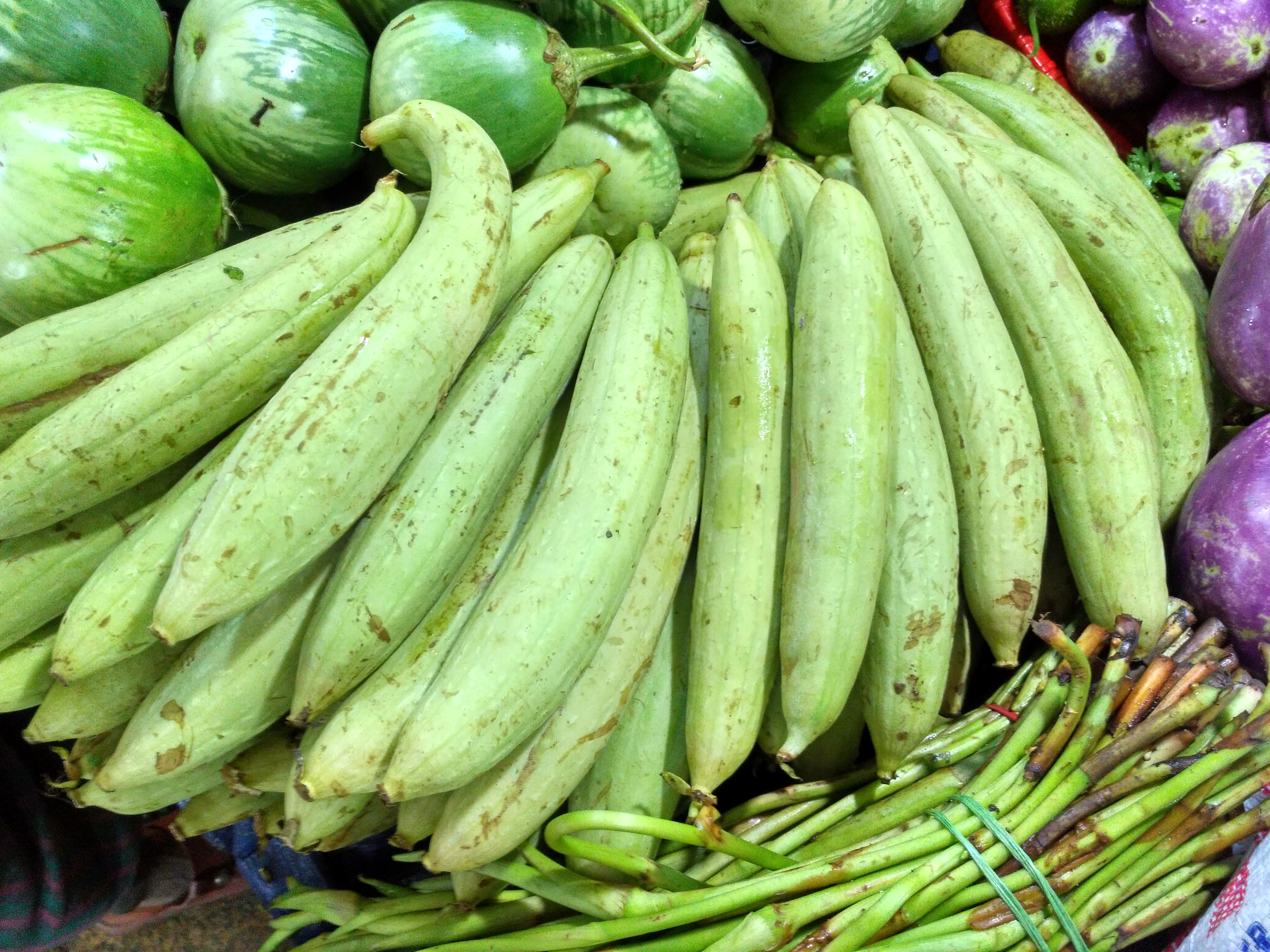
Sponge gourd in a market in Dhaka, Bangladesh.

=== Art ===
In the Levant, Luffa aegyptiaca has been in use since late antiquity. Young fruits were used for food. Mature fruits were used as bath sponges. Roman mosaics featuring Luffa aegyptiaca fruits have been discovered in churches and synagogues throughout Palestine.

Luffa in Kursi mosaic, Golan Heights	Luffa in mosaic at Beth Alfa synagogue

== Cultivation ==
Luffa has been cultivated throughout Asia for centuries for use as a household cleaning agent and is now, due to the gently abrasive quality of the natural fibers, a popular exfoliating agent in the eco-friendly cosmetic industry. Owing to its striking yellow flowers, the plant is occasionally grown as an ornamental.

=== Climate ===
It requires much heat and a lot of water to thrive. However, Luffa aegyptiaca can be cultivated in temperate climates. Research from North Carolina suggests that commercial production of luffa in the United States could be economically viable.

=== Growth ===
Techniques that contribute to success in growing luffa include using black mulch to warm soil temperatures and transplants to increase the germination rate and extend the growing season. Narrow spacing may result in poorer quality sponges. It is best grown with a trellis support for its curled tendrils to hang on to.
