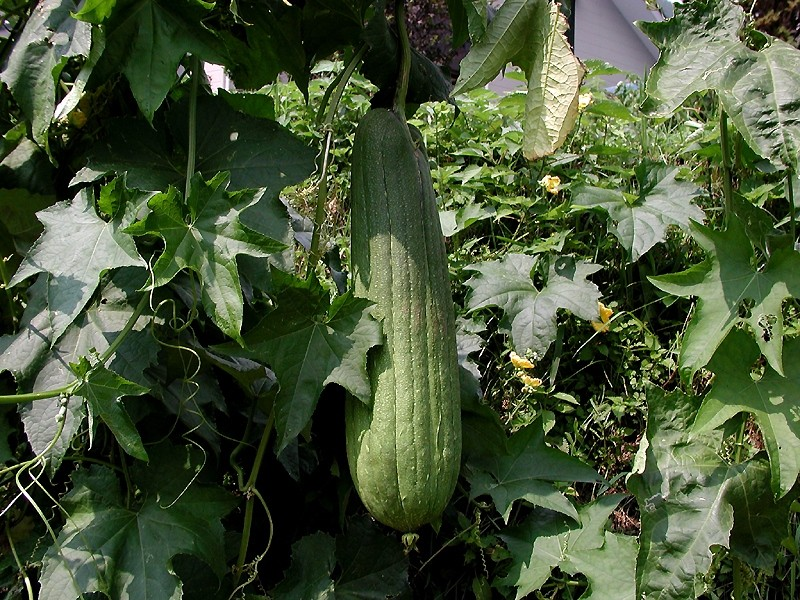
- Egyptian luffa with nearly mature fruit

Scientific classification
- Kingdom: Plantae
- Clade: Tracheophytes
- Clade: Angiosperms
- Clade: Eudicots
- Clade: Rosids
- Order: Cucurbitales
- Family: Cucurbitaceae
- Subfamily: Cucurbitoideae
- Tribe: Sicyoeae
- Genus: Luffa; Mill.

Species
- Luffa acutangula (L.) Roxb. (angled luffa, ridged luffa, vegetable gourd); Luffa aegyptiaca Mill. (smooth luffa, Egyptian luffa, dishrag gourd, gourd loofa); Luffa astorii Svenson; Luffa echinata Roxb.; Luffa graveolens Roxb.; Luffa operculata (L.) Cogn. (wild loofa, sponge cucumber); Luffa quinquefida (Hook. & Arn.) Seem.; Luffa saccata F.Muell. ex I.Telford; Luffa sepium (G.Mey.) C.Jeffrey

Synonyms
- Poppya Neck.; Trevouxia Scop.; Turia Forssk. ex J.F.Gmel.

= Luffa =

Genus of vines

Luffa (/ˈluːfə/ LOO-fə) is a genus of tropical and subtropical vines in the pumpkin, squash and gourd family (Cucurbitaceae).

In everyday non-technical usage, the luffa, also spelled loofah or less frequently loofa, usually refers to the fruits of the species Luffa aegyptiaca and Luffa acutangula. It is cultivated and eaten as a vegetable, but must be harvested at a young stage of development to be edible. The vegetable is popular in Pakistan, India, China, Nepal, Bhutan, Bangladesh, Indonesia and Vietnam. When the fruit fully ripens, it becomes too fibrous for eating. The fully developed fruit is the source of the loofah scrubbing sponge. In October 2025, the world record for the heaviest luffa was broken at the North Carolina State Fair. The luffa, grown in Graham, NC weighed 11 lb 3.3 oz (5.08 kg).

== Names ==
The name luffa was taken by European botanists in the 17th century from the Arabic name لوف lūf.

In North America it is sometimes known as "Chinese okra", and in Spanish as estropajo.

== Uses ==
=== Fibers ===
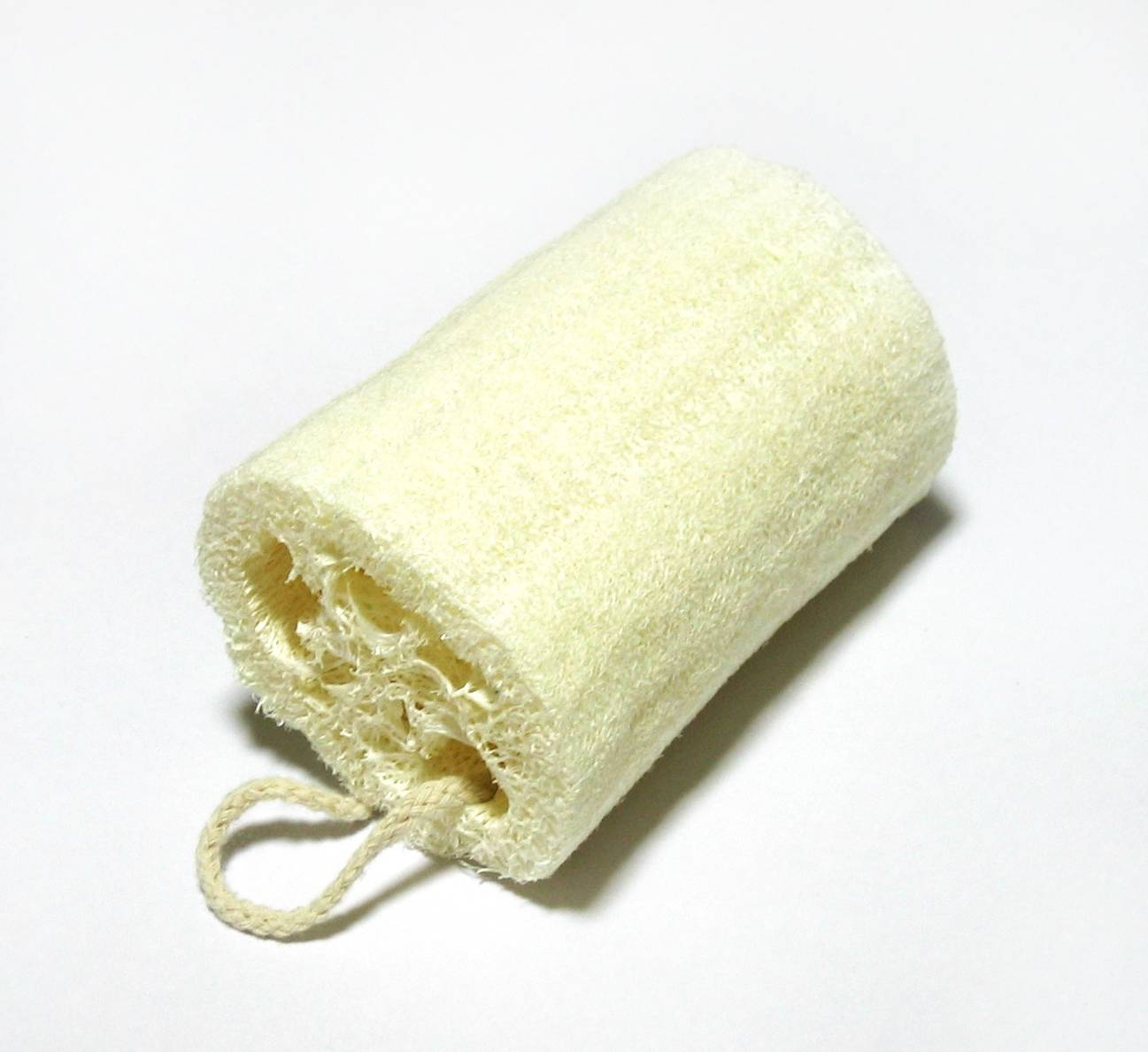
A bathroom loofa sponge

The fruit section of L. aegyptiaca may be allowed to mature and be used as a bath or kitchen sponge after being processed to remove everything except the network of xylem fibers. If the loofah is allowed to fully ripen and then dried on the vine, the flesh disappears, leaving only the fibrous skeleton and seeds, which can be easily shaken out. Marketed as luffa or loofah, the sponge is used as a body scrub in the shower.

In Paraguay, panels are made out of luffa combined with other vegetable matter and recycled plastic. These can be used to create furniture and construct houses.

=== Food ===
Luffa is a popular food item. There are various ways to prepare it including in soups or stir fries.

==== Indian subcontinent ====
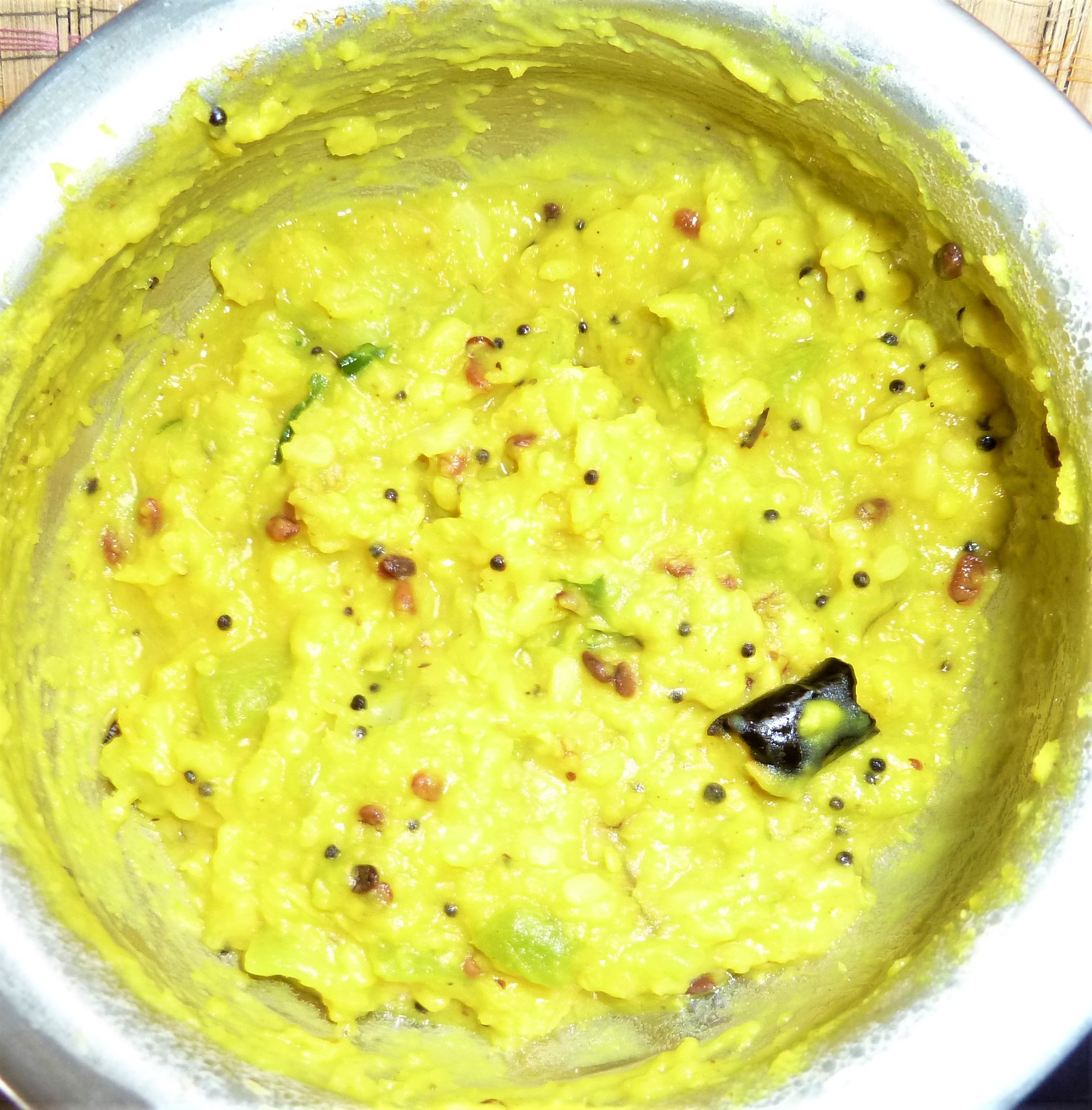
Ridge gourd with mung bean made in a house in Vijayawada, Andhra Pradesh, India

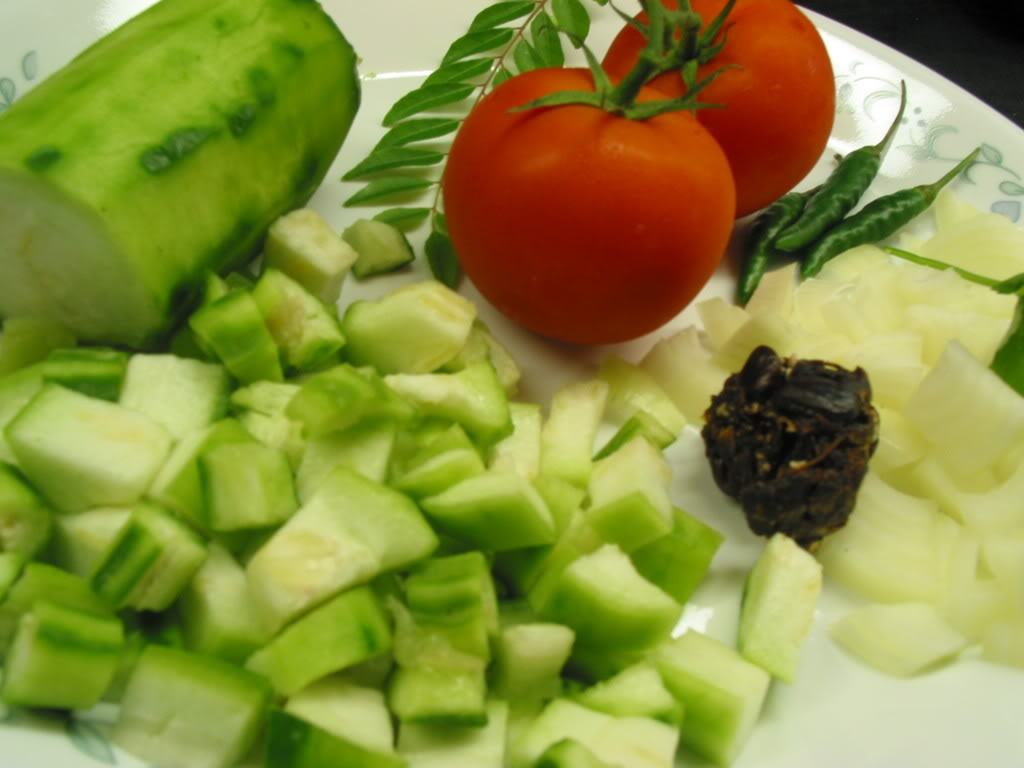
Beerakaya pulusu curry ingredients

In Hindi-speaking North India states, it is called torai (तोरई), and cooked as vegetable. In eastern-UP it is also called nenua while in central/Western India, specially in Madhya Pradesh, it is called gilki (गिल्की). Torai is reserved for ridge gourd and is less popular than gilki in central western India.

In Punjabi-speaking Punjab, sponge gourd is called tori (ਤੋਰੀ), while ridged gourd is called ram tori (ਰਾਮ ਤੋਰੀ) and the fruit and flowers are mostly used in dishes.

In Bhojpuri speaking regions, it is called ghiura (घिउरा). Apart from the fruit of the vegetable, flowers are also used as a vegetable as chokha, tarua, pakoda, etc.

In Nepal and Nepali language speaking Indian states, sponge gourd is called ghiraula (घिरौंला), while the ridged variety is called pate ghiraula (पाटे घिरौंला). Both are popular vegetables usually cooked with tomatoes, potatoes and served with rice.

In Gujarat, ridge gourd and sponge gourd are known as turya (તુરીયા) and galka (ગલકા) in Gujarati respectively. Ridge gourd is called ghissori or ghissora (ઘિસ્સોરી/ઘિસ્સોરા) in Kutchi. They are usually made with tomato gravy and garnished with green chillies and fresh coriander. When cooked roti is shredded by hand and mixed into it, it is colloquially known as "rotli shaak ma bhuseli". Alternatively, this dish is also eaten mixed with plain cooked rice.

In Bengali-speaking Bangladesh and the Indian state of West Bengal, ridge gourd is called jhinge (ঝিঙ্গে), while sponge gourd is known as dhundhul (ধুঁধুল), both being popular vegetables. They are eaten, fried or cooked with shrimp, fish, or meat.

In the Odia language of Odisha, ridge gourd (luffa acutangula) is known as janhi (ଜହ୍ନି), while sponge gourd (luffa aegyptiaca) is called tarada(ତରଡ଼ା), both accompanying many vegetarian and non-vegetarian dishes, most notably in dishes like "khira santula", where it is boiled with minuscule spices and simmered in milk. Another popular version involves mashing it in groundnut oil, herbs, peanuts and topping it with the peeled skin pieces.

In Assamese speaking areas of Assam, it is called bhula (ভোল, luffa aegyptiaca) and is cooked with sour fish curry along with taro. A related species is called jika (জিকা, Luffa acutangula), which is used as a vegetable in a curry, chutney and stir fry .

In Tamil language of Tamil Nadu, Luffa acutangula (ridged gourd) is called peerkangai (பீர்க்கங்காய்) and Luffa aegyptiaca / Luffa cylindrica (sponge gourd) is called nurai peerkankai (நுரை பீர்க்கங்காய்) and are used as vegetables to make peerkangai kootu, poriyal, and thogayal. Even the skin is used to make chutney.

In Karnataka's Kannada speaking areas, sponge gourd is better known as tuppa dahirekayi (ಟುಪ್ಪಾದ ಹೀರೆಕಾಯಿ), literally translating to "buttersquash" in English, while ridge gourd is known as hirekayi (ಹೀರೆಕಾಯಿ) in standard Kannada. Naturally growing in this region, it's consumed when it is still tender and green. It is used as a vegetable in curries, but also as a snack, bhajji, dipped in chickpea batter and deep fried. In Tulu language, ridge gourd is known as Peere(ಪೀರೆ) and is used to prepare chutney and ajethna.

In Andhra Pradesh Telugu, ridge gourd is generally called beerakaya (బీరకాయ), while sponge gourd is called nethi beerakaya (సేతి బీరకాయ). It is used in making Dal, Fry, Roti Pacchadi, and wet curry.

In Malayalam language of Kerala, ridge gourd is commonly called peechinga (പീച്ചിങ്ങ) and poththanga in the Palakkad dialect, while sponge gourd is called Eeṇilla peechinga (ഏണില്ല പീച്ചിങ്ങ). It is also used as a vegetable, cooked with dal or stir fried. The fully matured fruit is used as a natural scrub in rural Kerala. In some places such as Wayanad, it grows as a creeper on fences.

In Marathi-speaking Maharashtra, its called dodka (दोडका, ridge gourd luffa) and ghosaļ (घोसाळ, smooth/sponge luffa) which are common vegetables, prepared with either crushed dried peanuts or with beans.

In Meitei language of Manipur, ridge gourd is called sebot (ꯁꯦꯕꯣꯠ) and sponge gourd is called sebot hekpa (ꯁꯦꯕꯣꯠ ꯍꯦꯀꯞ), which is cooked with other ingredients like potato, dried fish, fermented fish and served. They are also steamed before consuming or crushed (ironba) with other ingredients and served with steamed rice (chaak). Fried ones (kaanghou) are also favorites for many. Sebot is also eaten as a green vegetable.

==== Other Asian cuisines ====
In Sri Lanka, it is called වැටකොළු (waeṭakola, the Luffa acutangula variety) in Sinhalese and is a common ingredient in curries, even in dried forms.

In Vietnamese cuisine, the gourd is called mướp hương and is a common ingredient in soups and stir-fried dishes.

In China ( Chinese: 丝瓜; pinyin: sīguā, or in English, "silk melon"), Indonesia (where it is called oyong), and the Philippines (where it is called patola in Tagalog and kabatiti in Ilokano), in Taiwan (where it is called Chinese: 菜瓜; pinyin: càiguā; Tâi-lô: tshài-kue, or in English, "vegetable melon"), in Timor-Leste it is also called patola or batola in Tetum and in Manipur, India, (where it is called sebot) the luffa is eaten as a green vegetable in various dishes.

In Japan it is called hechima (へちま) and is cultivated all over the country during summer. It is commonly used as a green vegetable in traditional dishes of the Ryukyu Islands (where it is called naabeeraa). In other regions it is also grown for uses other than food.

In Nepal it is called ghiraula and consumed as a vegetable at a young age. When it becomes ripe and dried, it is used as a body scrubbing material during bathing.

==== Western cuisines ====
Luffa is also known as "Chinese okra" in Canada and the U.S.

=== Other uses ===
In Japan, in regions other than the Ryukyu Islands and Kyushu, it is known as hechima, and is predominantly grown for use as a sponge or for applying soap, shampoo, and lotion. As with bitter melon, many people grow it outside building windows as a natural sunscreen in summer.

In Taiwan, the loofah plant is also valued for its use in skincare. The liquid extract from the plant, known as 菜瓜水 (luffa water), is commonly used as a natural facial toner and moisturizer. Taiwanese cosmetics companies such as Kuan Yuan Lian have popularized loofah-based skincare products, emphasizing their hydrating and soothing properties.

== Role in food chain ==
Luffa species are used as food plants by the larvae of some Lepidoptera species, including Hypercompe albicornis and Zeugodacus tau.

== Mechanical properties ==
The luffa sponge is a biological cellular material. These materials often exhibit exceptional mechanical properties at low densities. While their mechanical performance tends to fall behind manmade materials, such as alloys, ceramics, plastics, and composites, as a structural material, they have long term sustainability for the natural environment. When compressed longitudinally, a luffa sponge is able to absorb comparable energy per unit mass as aluminum foam. Luffa sponges are composed of a complex network of fiber bundles connected to form a 3-dimensional, highly-porous network.

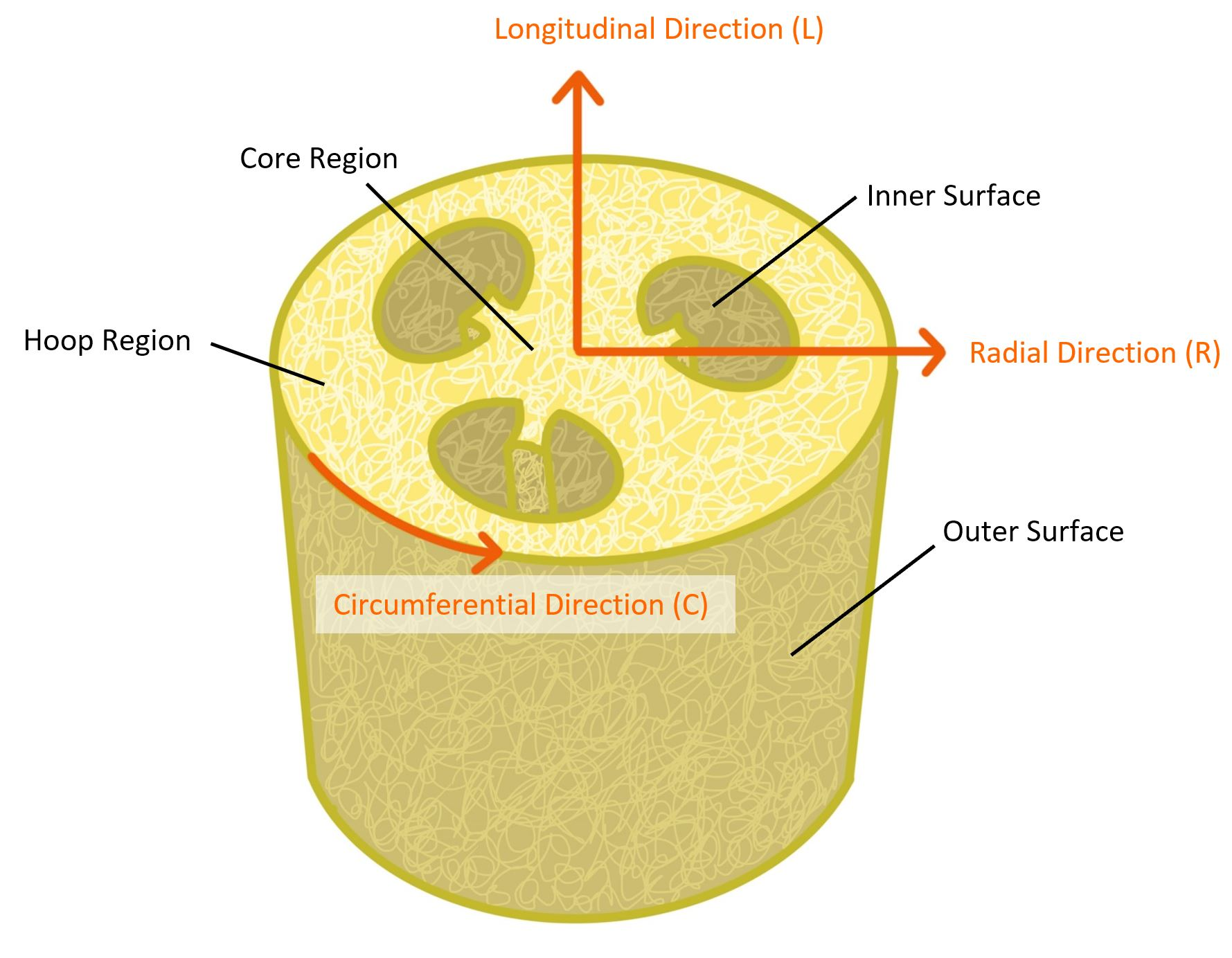
Definition of the parts of a luffa sponge and the relevant coordinate system for mechanical properties measurements

The hierarchical structure of luffa sponges results in mechanical properties that vary with the component of sponge tested. Specifically, the mechanical properties of fiber bundles differ from those of blocks from the bulk of the sponge, which differ from those of the cross sections of the entire sponge.

=== Fiber-bundles ===
Uniaxial tensile tests of fiber bundles isolated from the inner surface provide insight this basic strut element of the luffa sponges. These fiber bundles vary in diameter from 0.3 to 0.5 mm. Each fiber bundle has a low density core region not occupied by fibers. The stress-strain response of the fiber bundles is nearly linear elastic all the way until fracture, suggesting the absence of work hardening. The slope of the linear region of the stress-strain curve, or Young’s modulus, is 236* MPa. The highest stress achieved before fracture, or ultimate tensile strength, is 103 MPa. The strain at which failure occurs, or failure strain, is small at only 5%. The mechanical properties of fiber bundles decrease dramatically when the size of the hollow region inside the bundle increases. Despite their low tensile strength, the fiber bundles have a high specific modulus of 2.07– 4.05 MPa⋅m^{3}/kg, and their overall properties are improved when a high ratio of their cross sectional area is occupied by fibers, they are evenly distributed, and there is strong adhesion between fibers.

=== Bulk-sponge ===
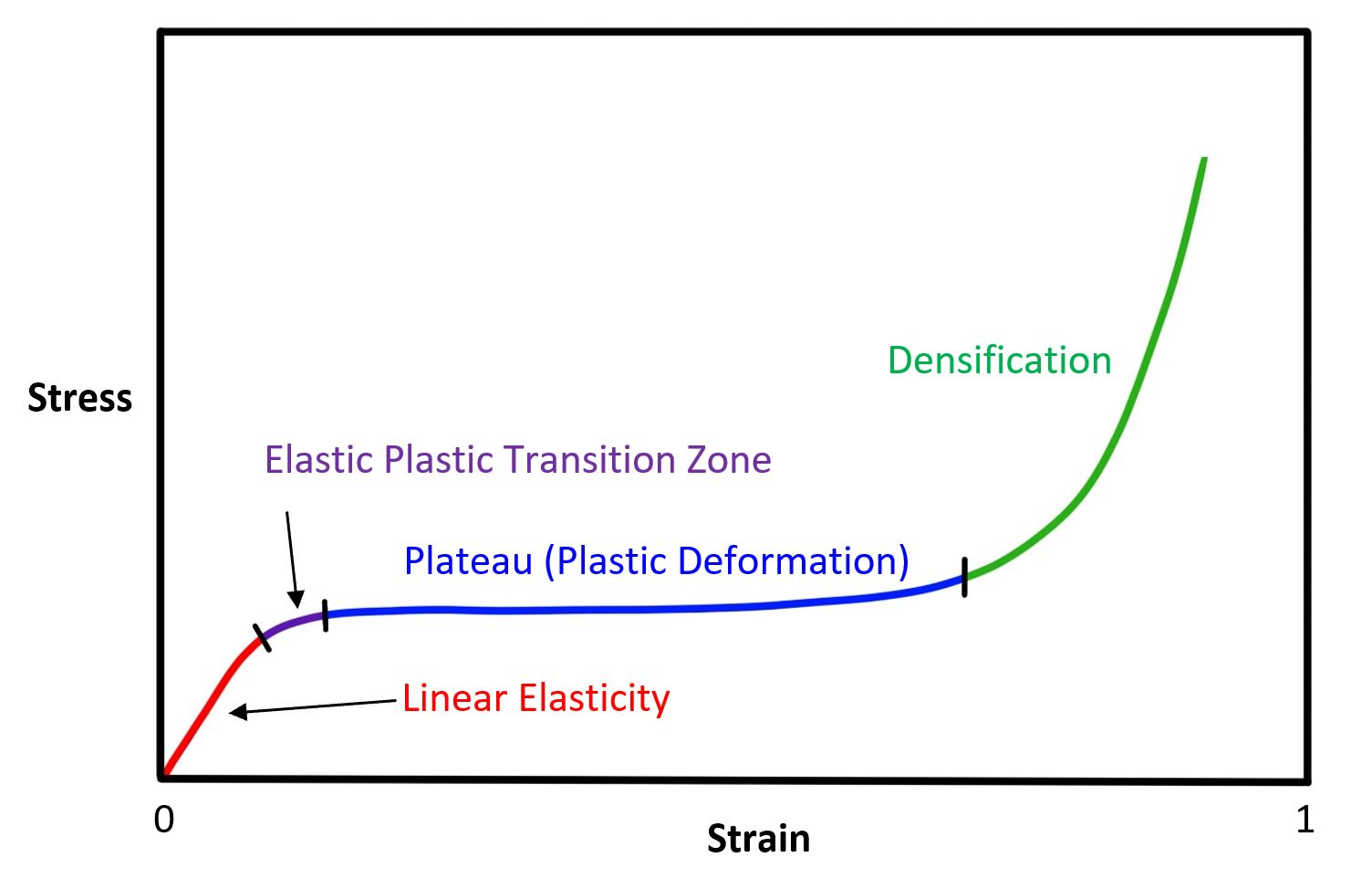
Characteristic stress-strain curve of a luffa sponge in compression

Block samples (height: 12.69 ± 2.35mm, width: 11.30 ± 2.88mm, length: 13.10 ± 2.64mm) cut from the core region and hoop region of the luffa sponge exhibit different mechanical behaviors under compression depending on both the orientation they are loaded in as well as the location in the sponge they are sampled from. The hoop region consists of the section of sponge located around the outside between the inner and outer surfaces, while the core region is from the sponge center. Samples from both the hoop and core regions exhibited yielding when compressed in the longitudinal direction due to the buckling of fibers. With the highly aligned fibers from the inner surface removed from the hoop region block samples, this yield behavior disappears. In general, the inner surface fibers most significantly impact the longitudinal properties of the luffa sponge column followed by the circumferential properties. There is no noticeable contribution to the radial properties. Additionally, the core region exhibits lower yield stress and energy absorption (as determined by the area under the stress-strain curve) compared to the hoop region due to its greater porosity.

Overall, the stress-strain curves of block samples exhibit three stages of mechanical behavior common to porous materials. Namely, the samples follow linear elasticity for strains less than 10%, followed by a plateau for strains from 10% to 60%, and finally a stress increase associated with densification at strains greater than 60%. Segment samples created from cross sections of the entire luffa sponge (diameter: 92.51 ± 6.15mm, height: 19.76 ± 4.95mm) when tested in compression exhibit this same characteristic behavior. The three stages can be described by the equations:

1. Linear elasticity region: $\sigma=E^*\varepsilon$ for $\varepsilon\le\varepsilon_e$
2. Plateau region: $\sigma=\sigma_p^*$ for $\varepsilon_e<\varepsilon\le\varepsilon_D(1-1/D)$
3. Densification region: $\sigma=\sigma_p^*/D{(\varepsilon_D/\varepsilon_D-\varepsilon)}^m$ for $\varepsilon>\varepsilon_D(1-1/D)$

In the above equations, $E^*$ is the Young's modulus and $\sigma_p^*$ the yield strength of the sponge material. These are chosen to best fit experimental data. The strain at the elastic limit, where the plateau region begins, is denoted as $\varepsilon_e$, while the strain at the onset of the densification region is $\varepsilon_D$.

$\varepsilon_D=1-1.4(\rho^*/\rho_s)$

Here $\rho^*$ is the density of the bulk sponge $\rho_s$ is the density of its constituent, the fiber bundle. The constant D defines the strain at the onset of densification as well as the stress relationship in the densification region. It is determined by fitting experimental data.

=== Dynamic loading ===
The mechanical properties of Luffa sponges change under different strain rates. Specifically, energy adsorption, compressive stress, and plateau stress (which is in the case of foam materials corresponds to the yield stress) are enhanced by increasing the strain rate. One explanation for this is that the luffa fibers undergo more axial deformation when dynamically loaded (high strain rates) than when quasi-statically loaded (low strain rates).

== Gallery ==
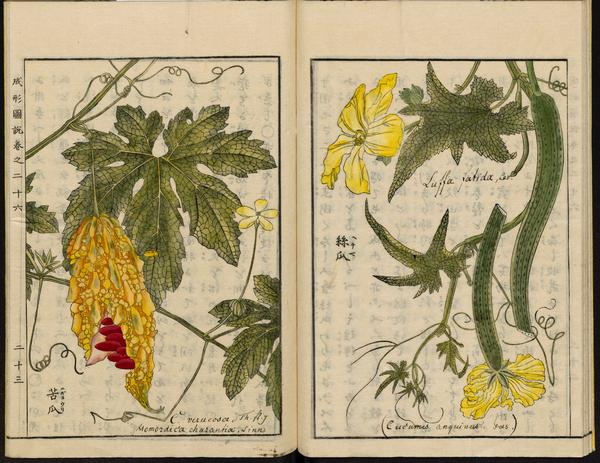
Luffa (right), illustration from the Japanese agricultural encyclopedia Seikei Zusetsu (1804)

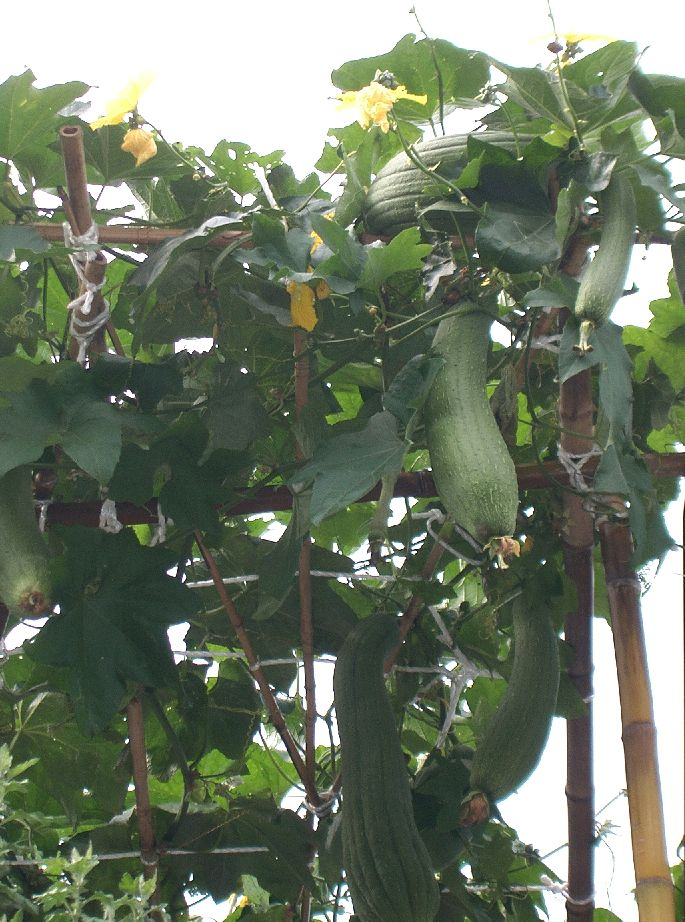
Habitus of the vine

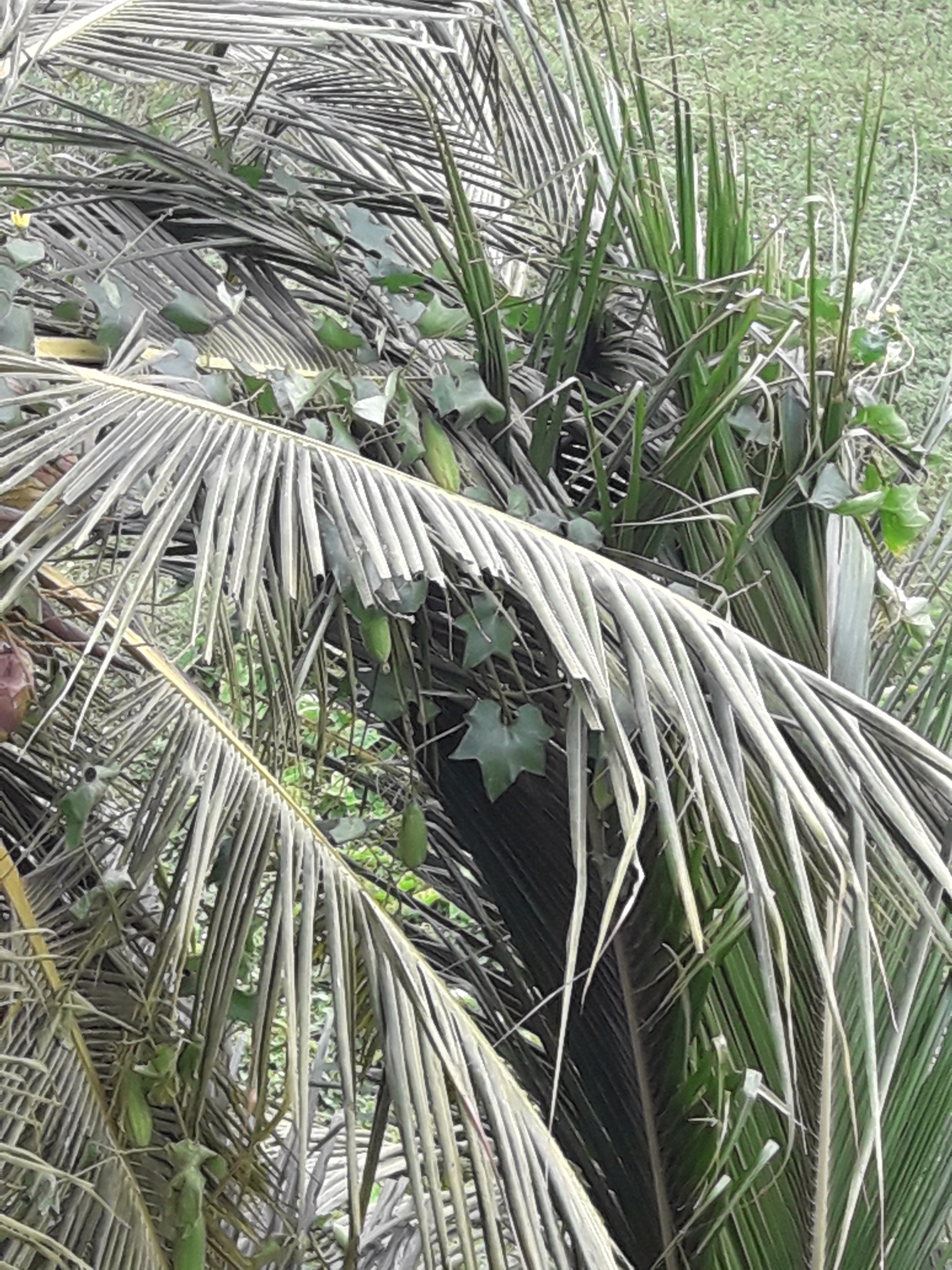
Luffa in a coconut tree

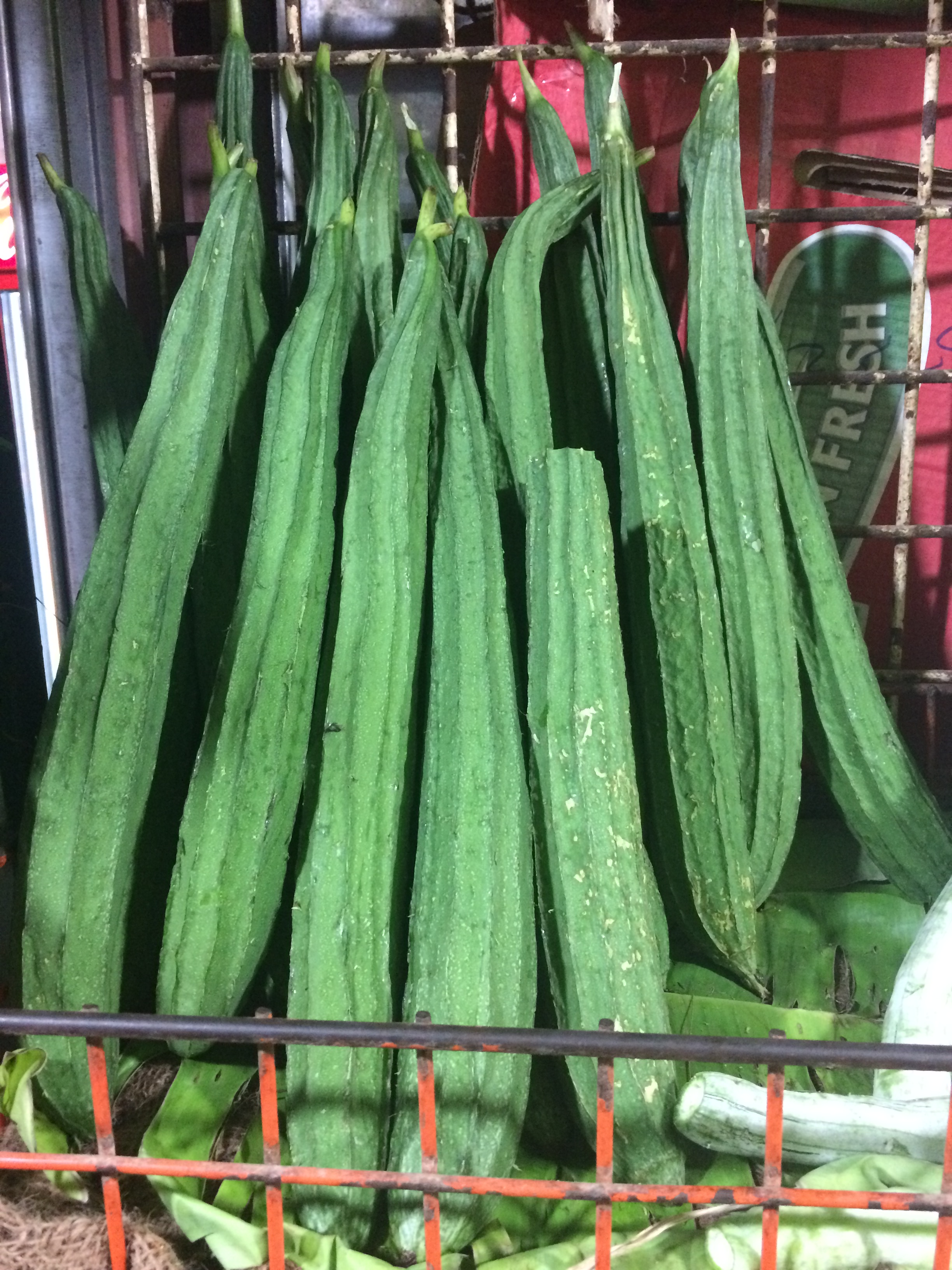
Commonly known as Ridge Gourd from Southern India

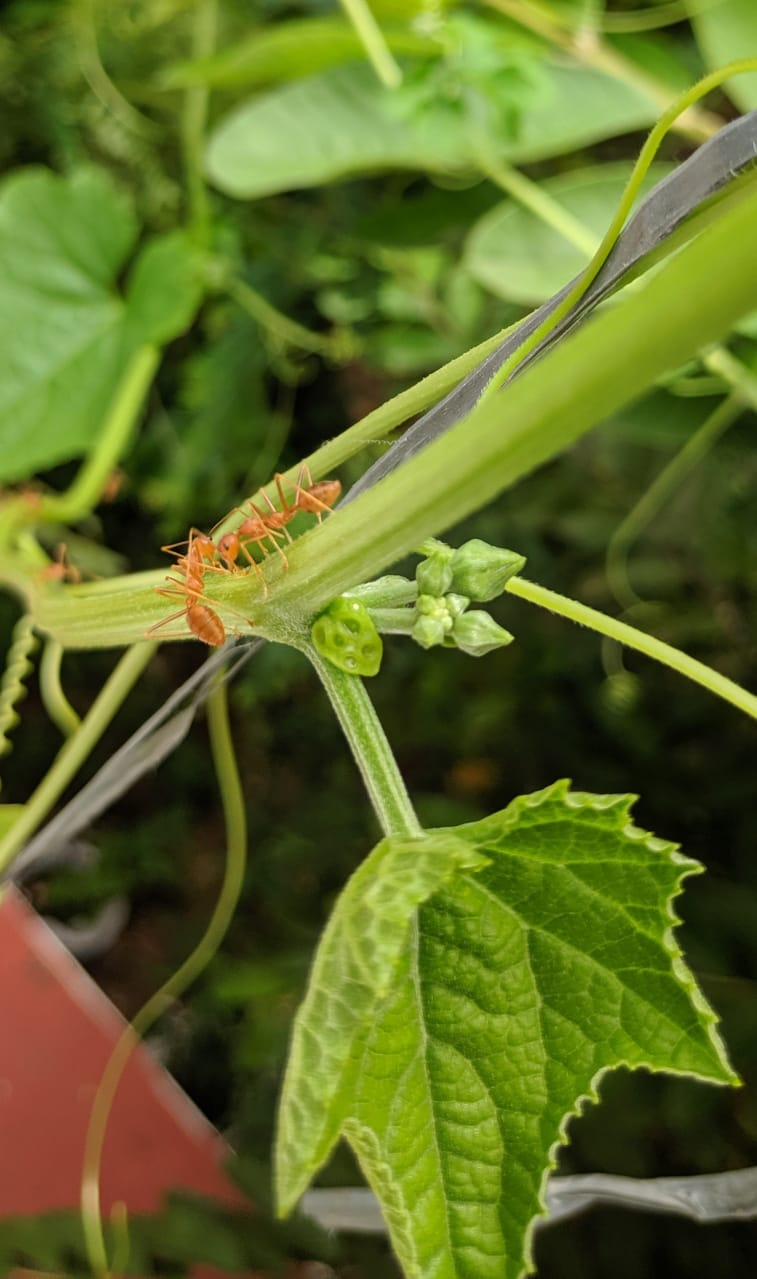
Extrafloral nectar glands in Luffa acutangula and Oecophylla smaragdina ants

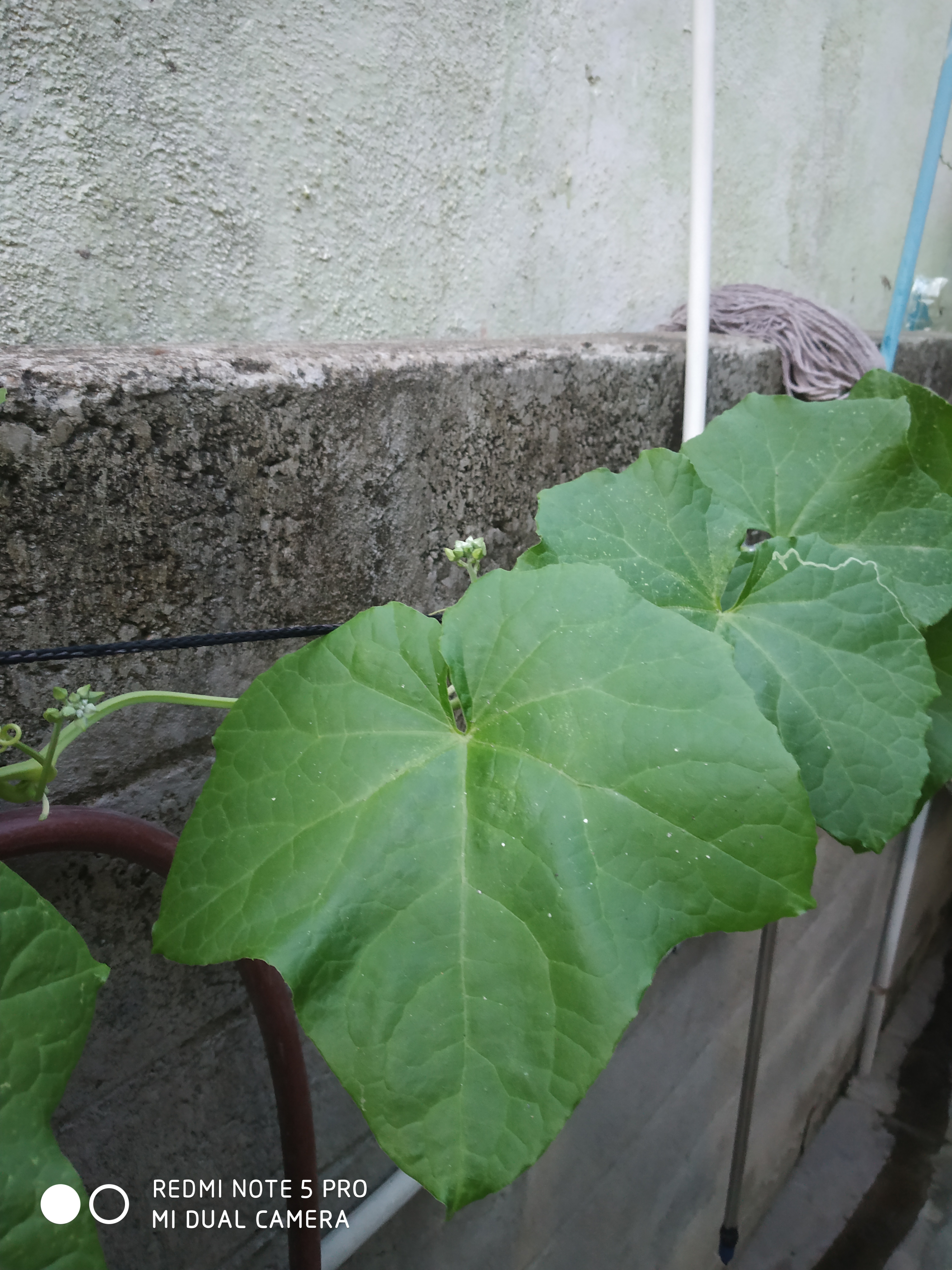
Luffa leaf

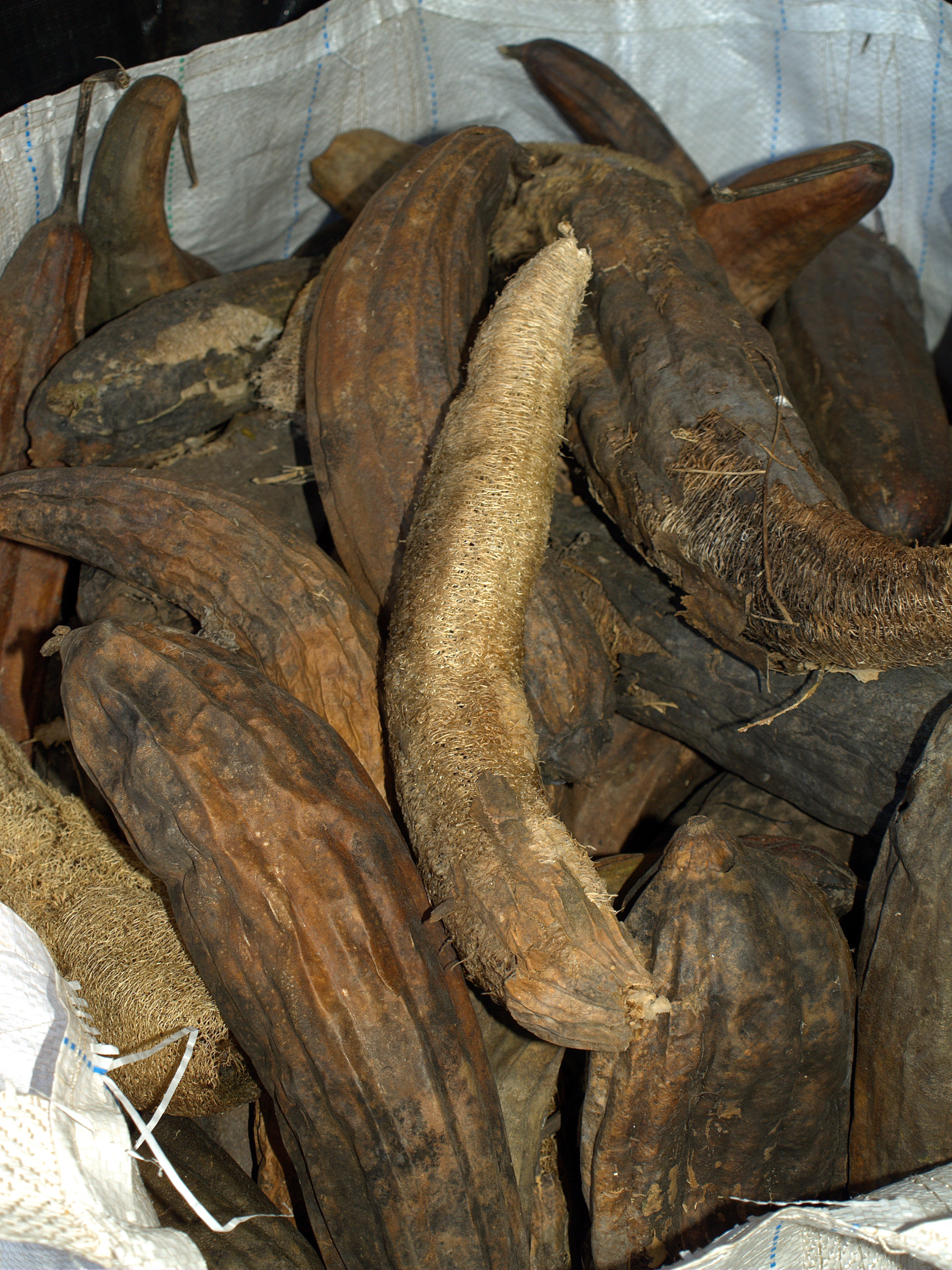
A bag of dried mature luffa fruits.

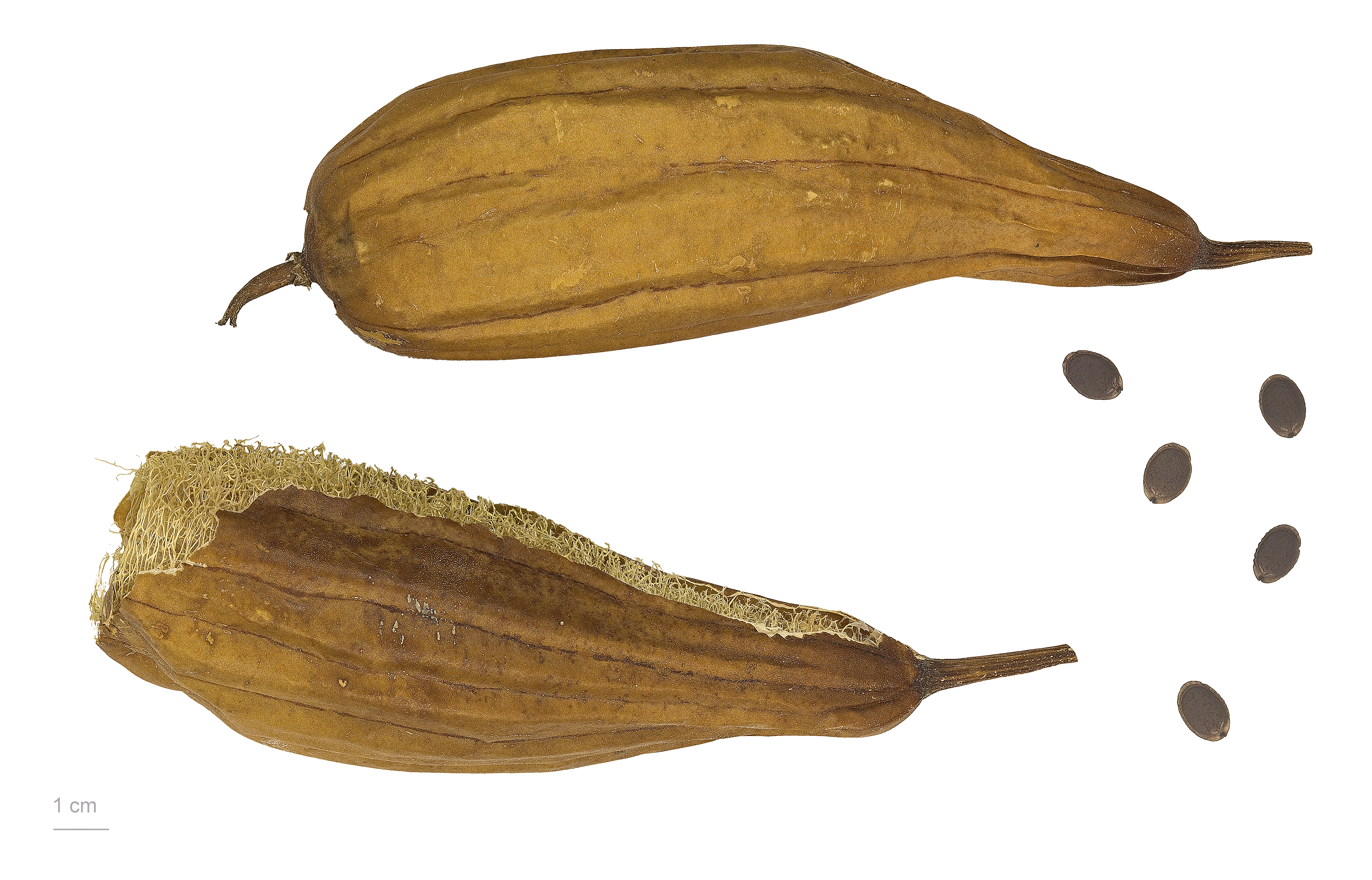
Luffa aegyptiaca, fruit and seeds - MHNT

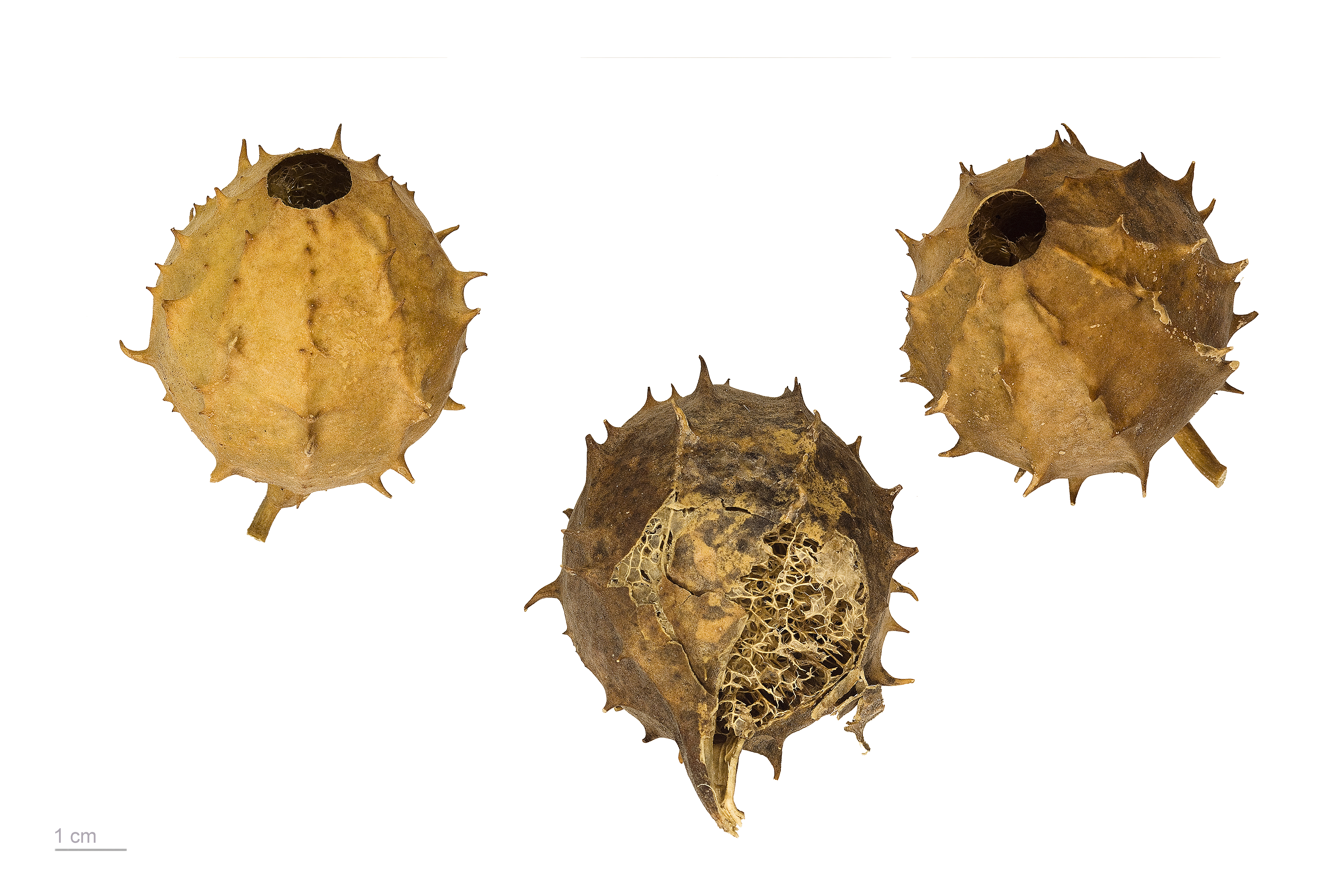
Luffa operculata, fruit - MHNT

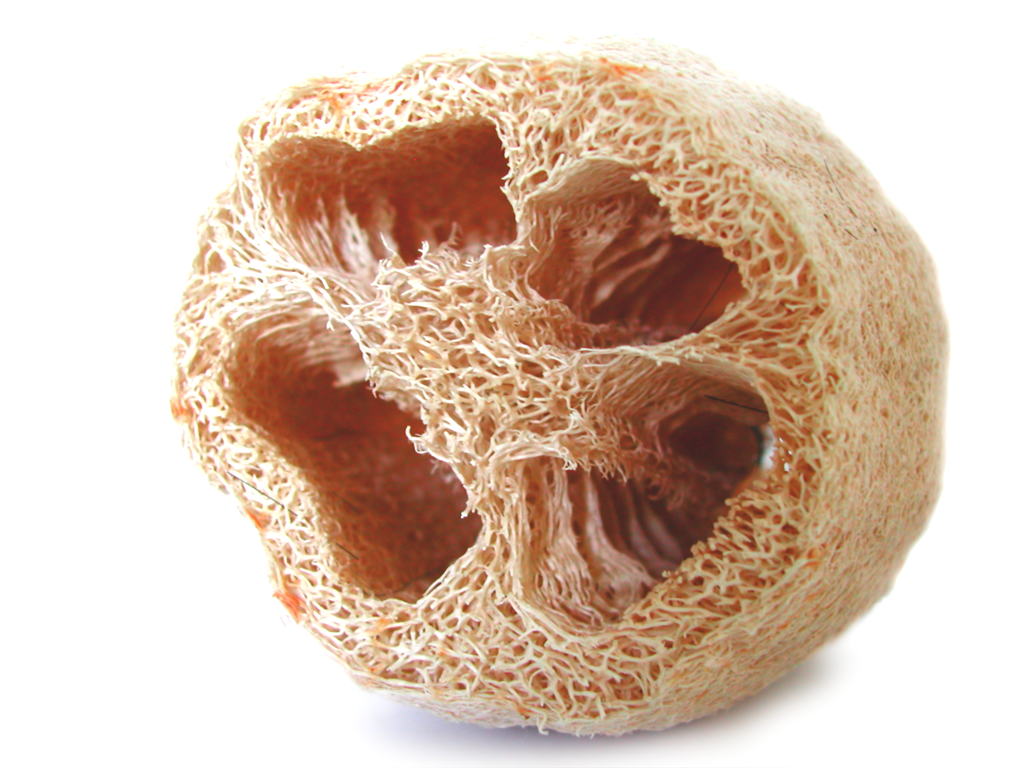
A luffa sponge whose coarse texture helps with skin polishing

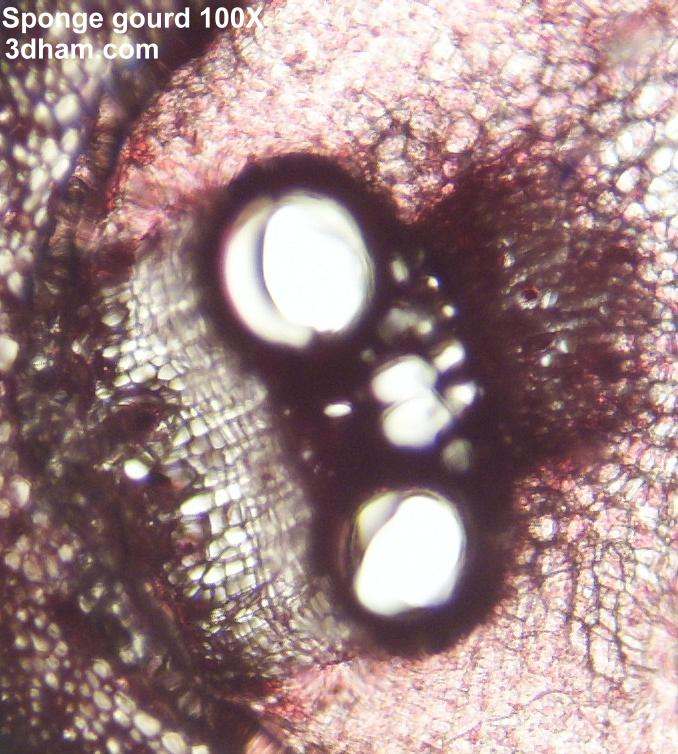
Luffa aegyptiaca sponge section magnified 100 times

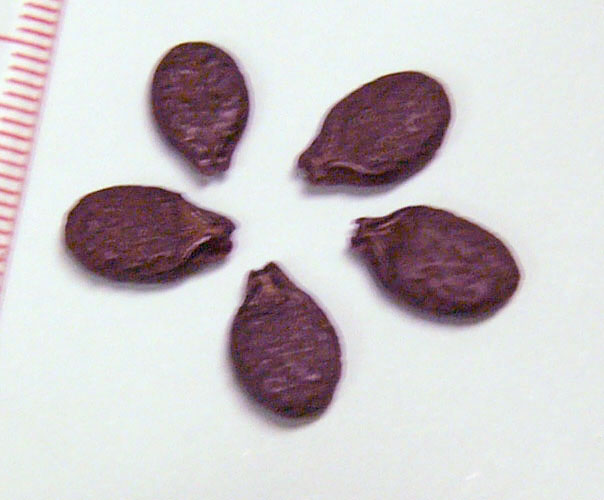
Luffa acutangula seeds. Each division of the ruler is 1 mm. Seeds of Luffa aegyptiaca look similar.

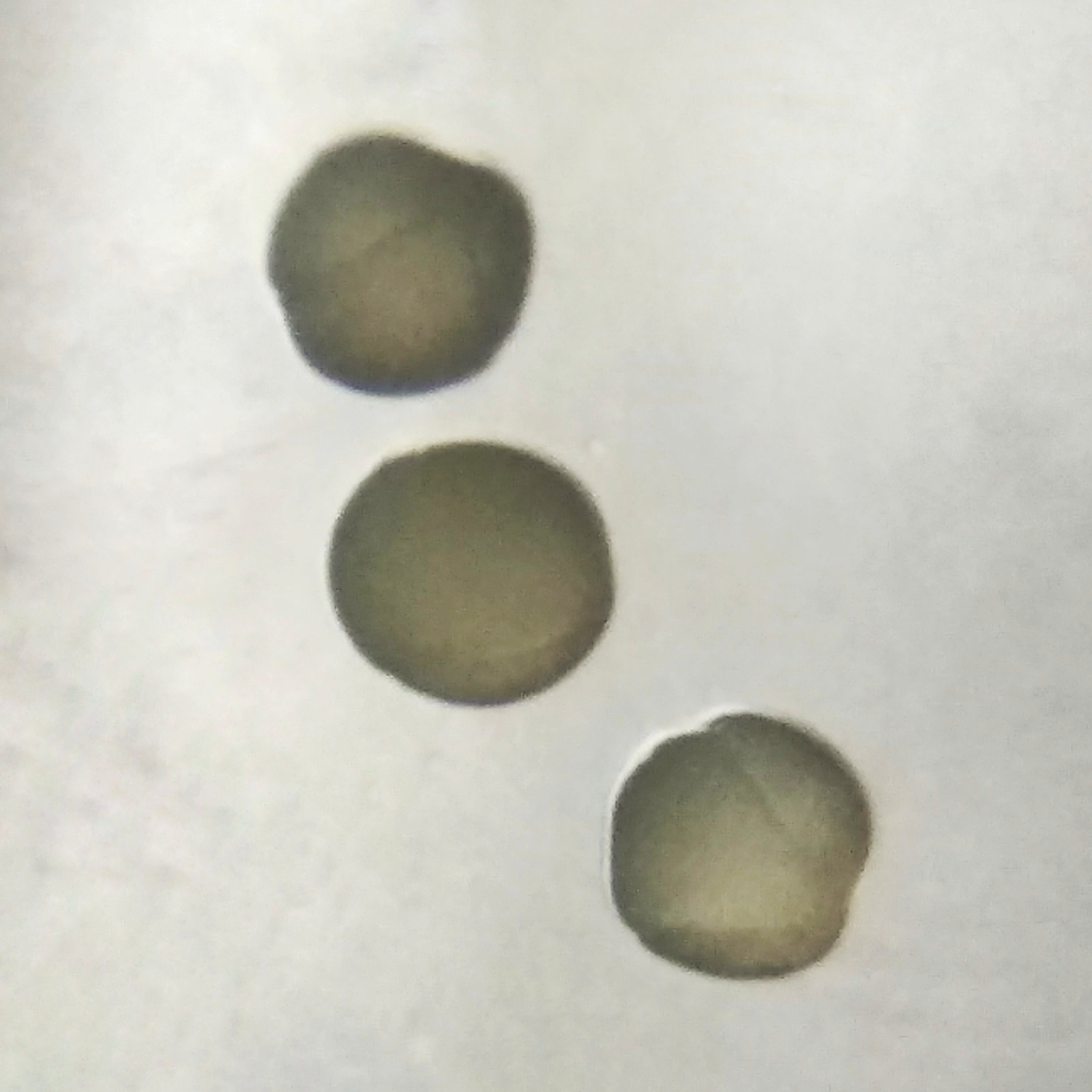
Pollen grains of Luffa

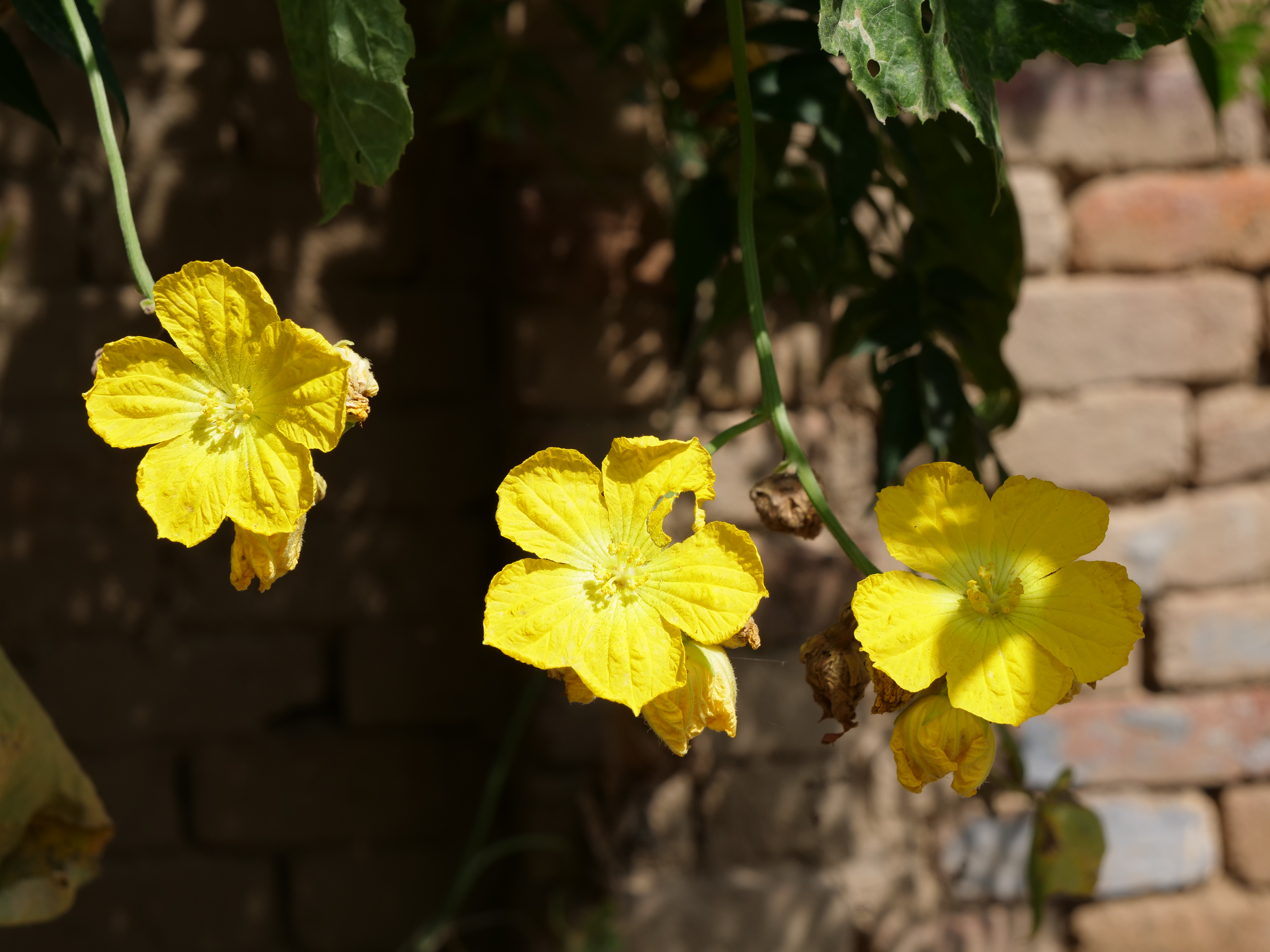
Luffa flowers

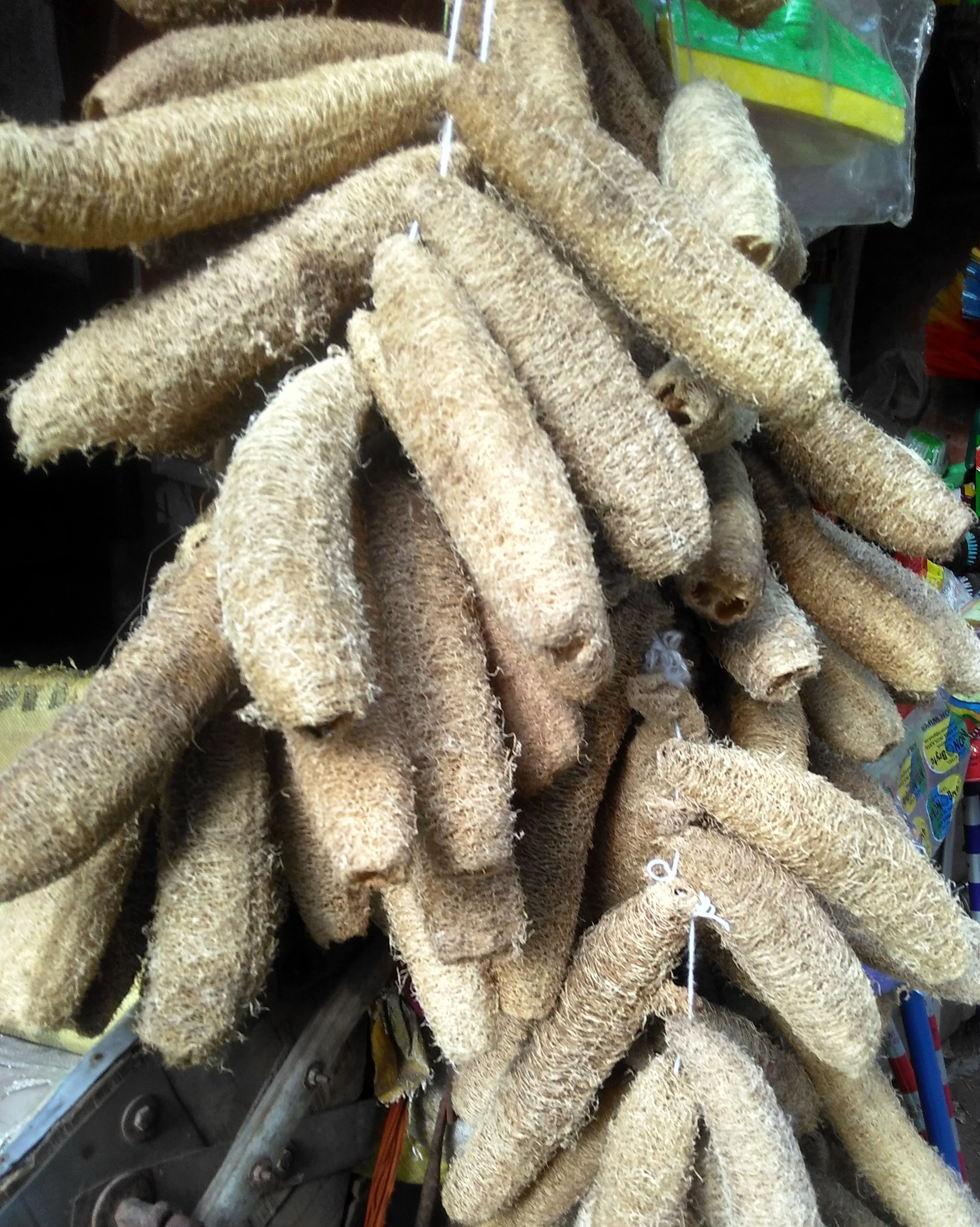
Sponges made of sponge gourd
