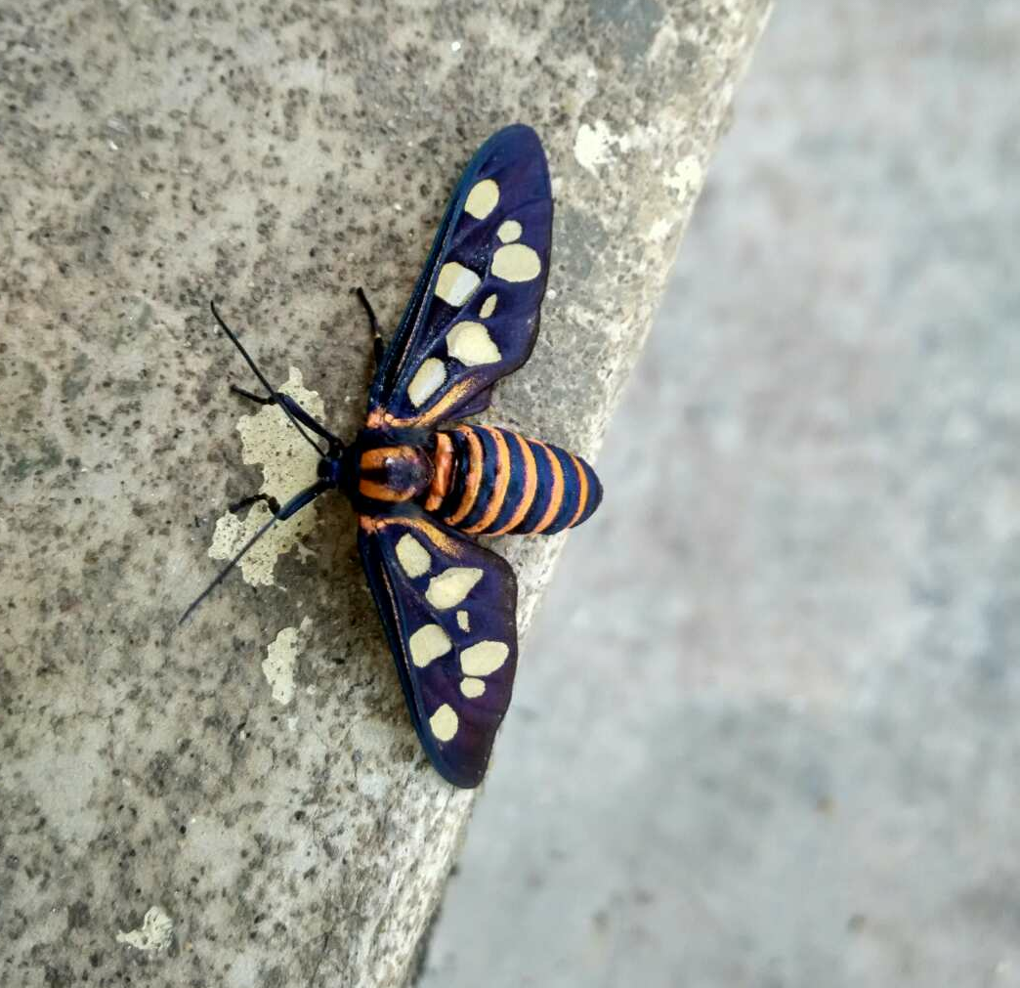

Scientific classification
- Domain: Eukaryota
- Kingdom: Animalia
- Phylum: Arthropoda
- Class: Insecta
- Order: Lepidoptera
- Superfamily: Noctuoidea
- Family: Erebidae
- Subfamily: Arctiinae
- Genus: Amata
- Species: A. passalis

Binomial name
- Amata passalis (Fabricius, 1781)

Synonyms
- Zygaena passalis Fabricius, 1781; Zygaena cerbera Sulzer, 1776; Sphinx creusa Cramer, 1779; Syntomis latreillei Boisduval, 1829; Syntomis montana Butler, 1876; Syntomis passalis

= Amata passalis =

Species of moth

Amata passalis, the sandalwood defoliator, is a moth of the family Erebidae first described by Johan Christian Fabricius in 1781. It is found in Sri Lanka and India.

== Biology ==
The average life cycle of the species in captivity is 62 days. After mating, the adult female lays about 305 eggs in a lifespan of 3.87 days. It is known to breed all year around and passes through 6-11 generations a year. There are eight larval instars. First and last instar larvae are about 1.97 mm and 29.29 mm in length, respectively. Adults usually emerge within 1 to 2 hours of sunrise. After a day, they are ready for mating.

It is known mainly as a defoliator of sandalwood (Santalum album) in India. It is also recorded on various alternate food plants, mainly cowpeas, various other pulses, and ornamental plants. The larval stage of Apanteles nepitae can be used as a parasite to control the moth.

=== Host plants ===
- Phaseolus vulgaris
- Santalum album
- Trichosanthes anguina
- Vigna unguiculata
- Capsicum annuum
- Brassica caulorapa
- Capsicum annuum
- Phaseolus vulgaris

== Gallery ==
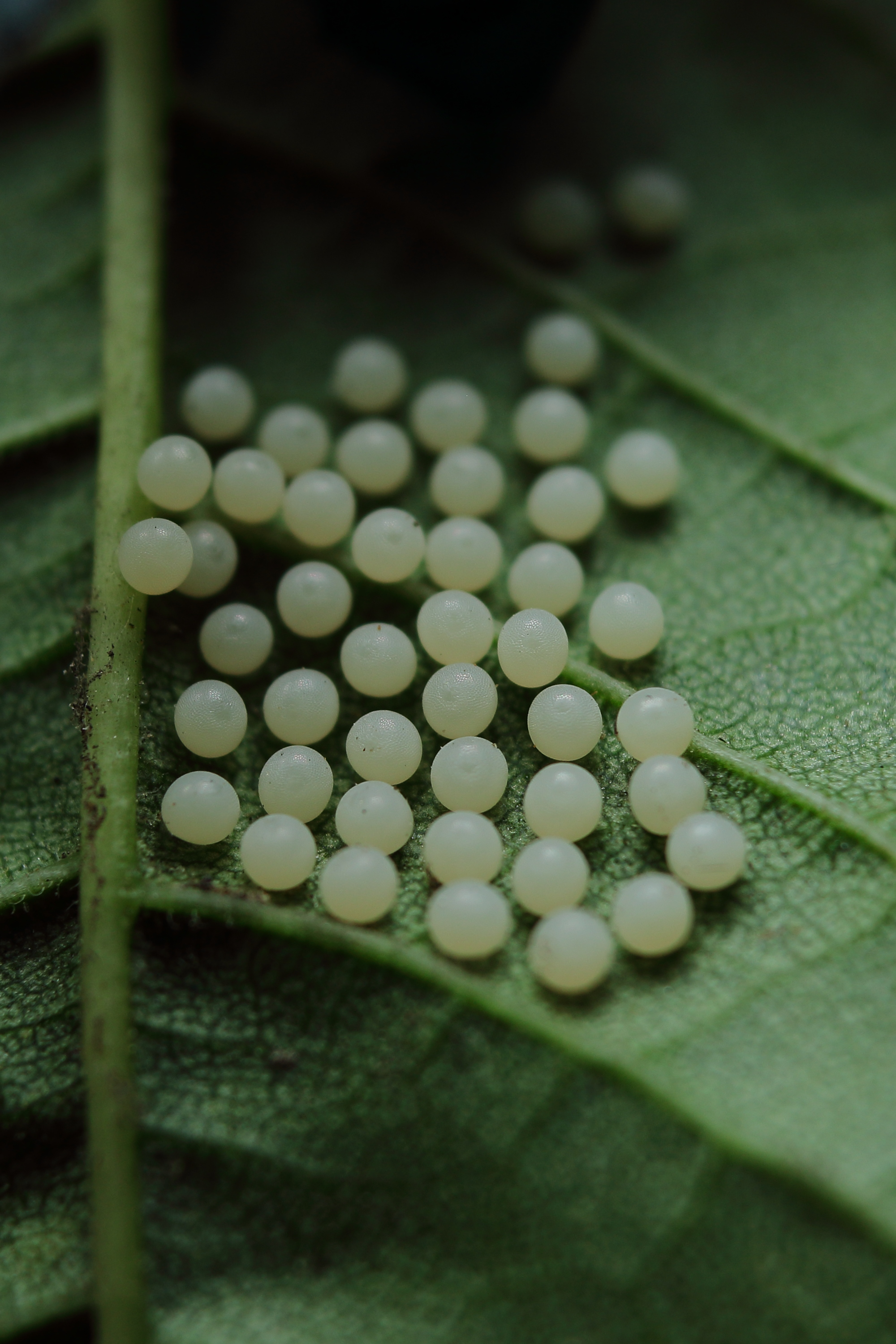
eggs

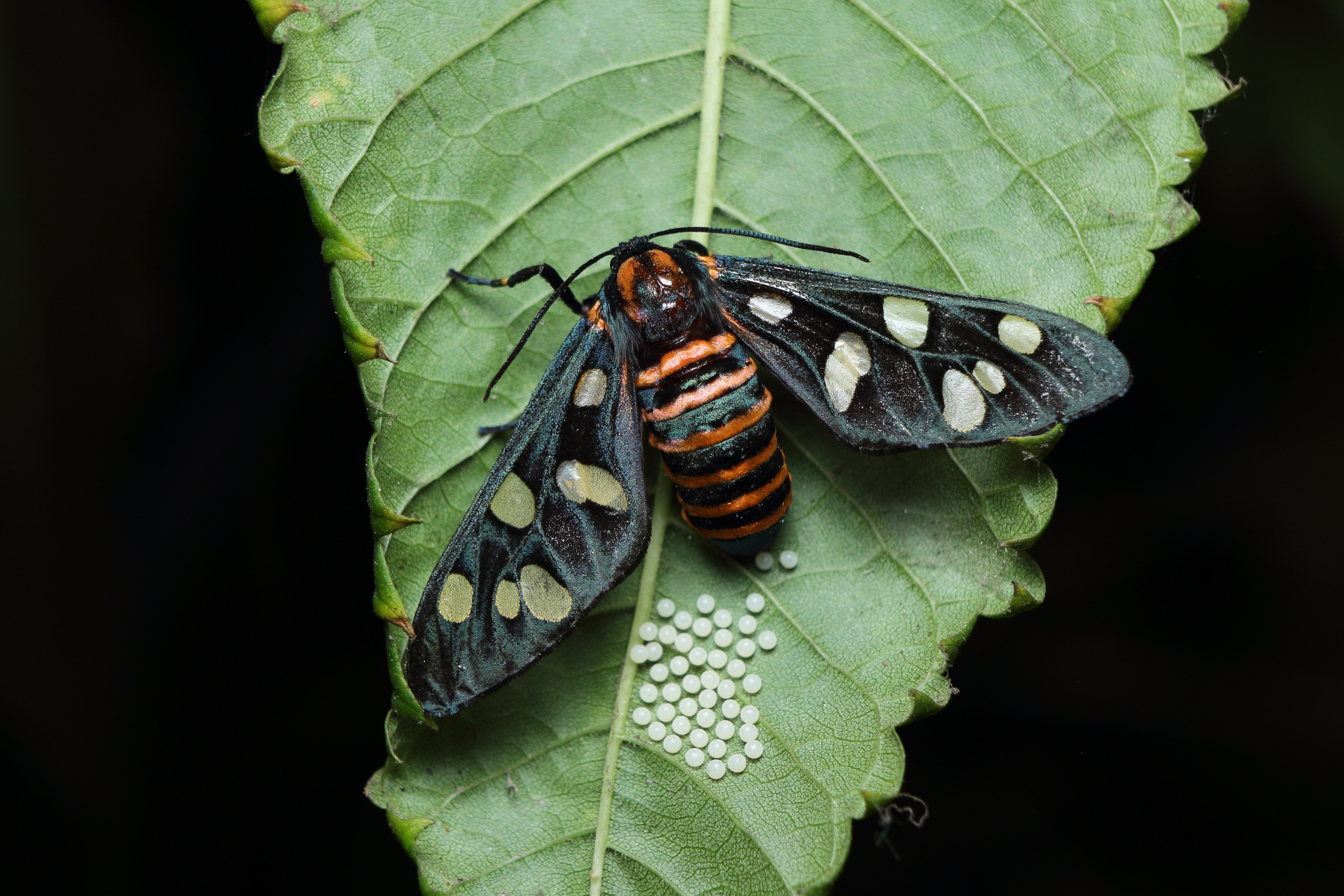
female with eggs

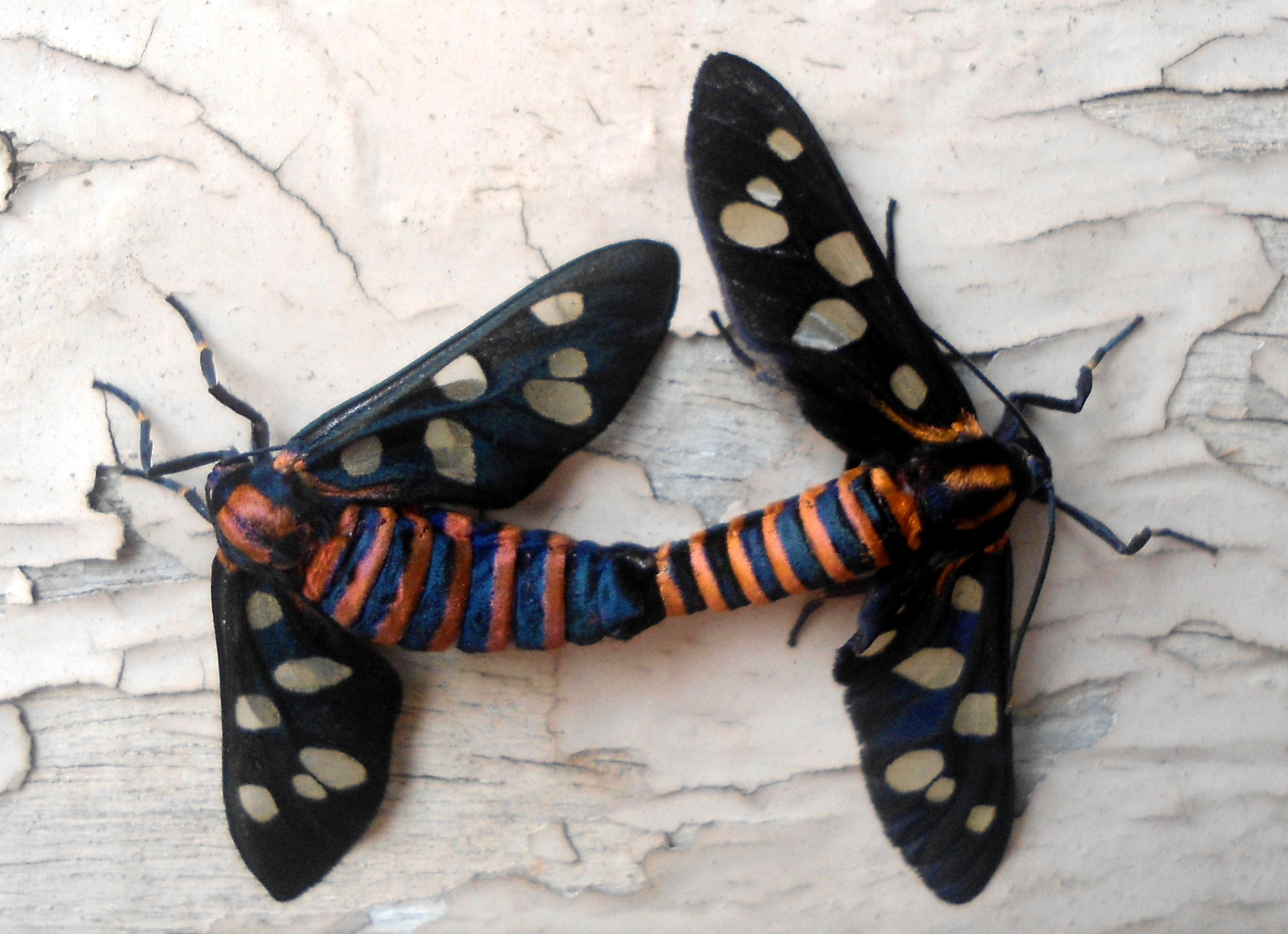
mating pair

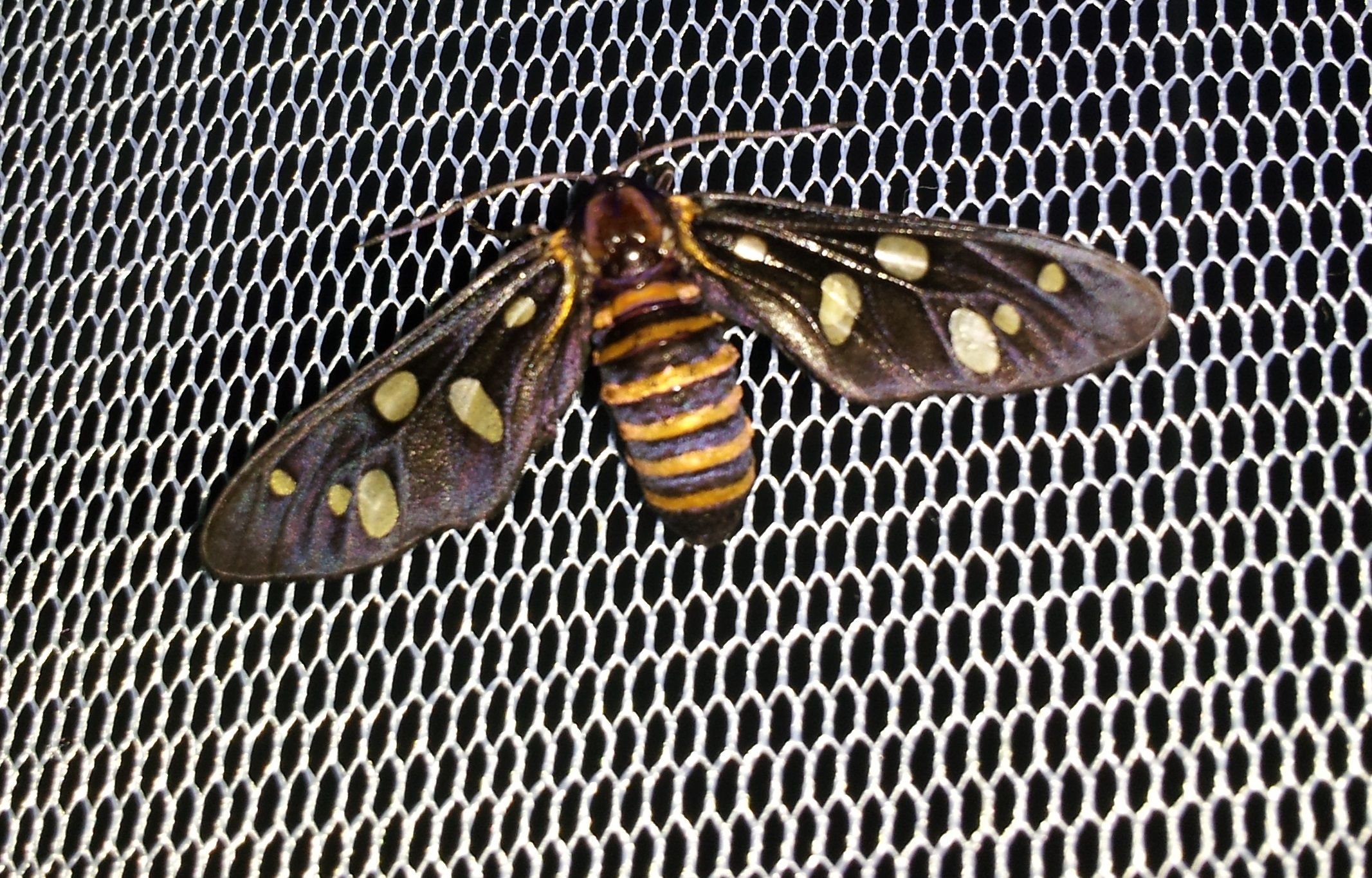
adult in Sri Lanka

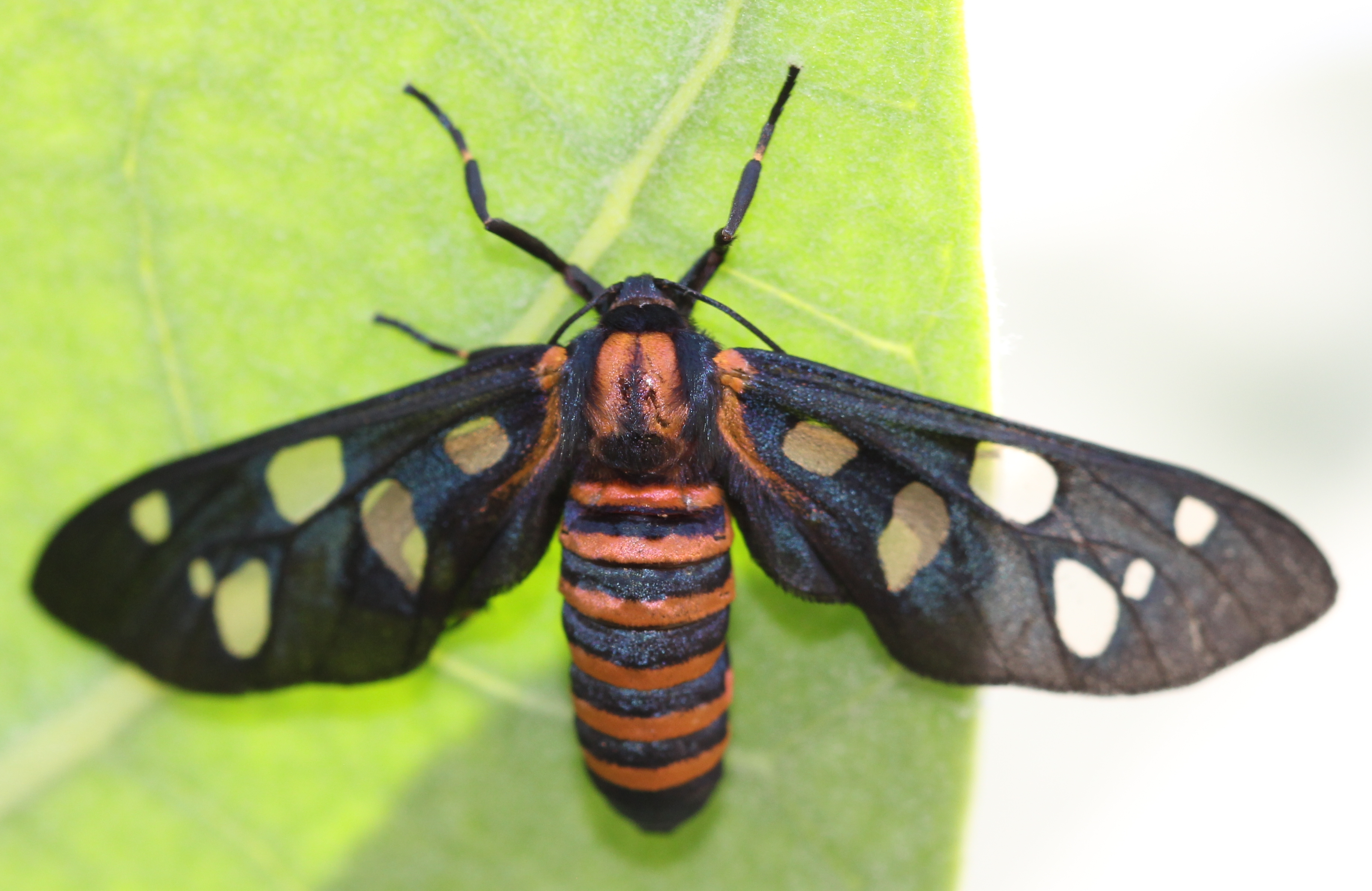
adult in India
