= T. pentaphylla =

T. pentaphylla may refer to:

- Tabebuia pentaphylla, a neotropical tree
  - Tecoma pentaphylla, synonym of Tabebuia pentaphylla
- Trichosanthes pentaphylla, a poisonous cucumber
