= Trichosanthes beccariana =

- Preserved specimen of Trichosanthes beccariana subsp. beccariana

Scientific classification
- Kingdom: Plantae
- Clade: Tracheophytes
- Clade: Angiosperms
- Clade: Eudicots
- Clade: Rosids
- Order: Cucurbitales
- Family: Cucurbitaceae
- Genus: Trichosanthes
- Species: T. beccariana

Binomial name
- Trichosanthes beccariana Cogn.

Synonyms
- Anguina beccariana (Cogn.) Kuntze

Species of flowering plant

Trichosanthes beccariana is a species of plant in the family Cucurbitaceae. It is a liana native to Borneo and Sumatra.

== Description ==
Trichosanthes beccariana has white flowers with green stems. Its fruit are dark green and striped when young, then turn orange and mature into red.

== Distribution and habitat ==
Trichosanthes beccariana primarily grows in wet, tropical regions.

== Taxonomy ==
Trichosanthes beccariana was first described in 1881 by Alfred Cogniaux.

There are two subspecies, Trichosanthes beccariana subsp. beccariana (which is native throughout the species' range) and Trichosanthes beccariana subsp. pusilla (which is native to only Borneo). T. beccariana subsp. pusilla was first described in 1998.
