= Trichosanthes metamorpha =

- Basal leaf of Trichosanthes metamorpha, with white patterns on the adaxial surface

Scientific classification
- Kingdom: Plantae
- Clade: Tracheophytes
- Clade: Angiosperms
- Clade: Eudicots
- Clade: Rosids
- Order: Cucurbitales
- Family: Cucurbitaceae
- Genus: Trichosanthes
- Species: T. metamorpha

Binomial name
- Trichosanthes metamorpha R.Z. Wang, N. Wei and Q.F. Wang

Species of flowering plant

Trichosanthes metamorpha is a dioecious perennial climber in the gourd family (Cucurbitaceae). It was described in 2026 from Yangshuo County, Guilin, Guangxi, China, and is placed in Trichosanthes sect. Involucraria.

It was found in 2024 by the first author, then a 16-year-old enthusiast of Cucurbitaceae, during fieldwork in Yangshuo. The epithet refers to the stable difference between basal and apical leaves. It is distinguished from the similar T. dunniana and T. pubera by pinpoint black dots on the stem, white patterns on the basal leaves, short brittle petal fringes, orange-yellow fruit, and smooth seeds without ridges.
