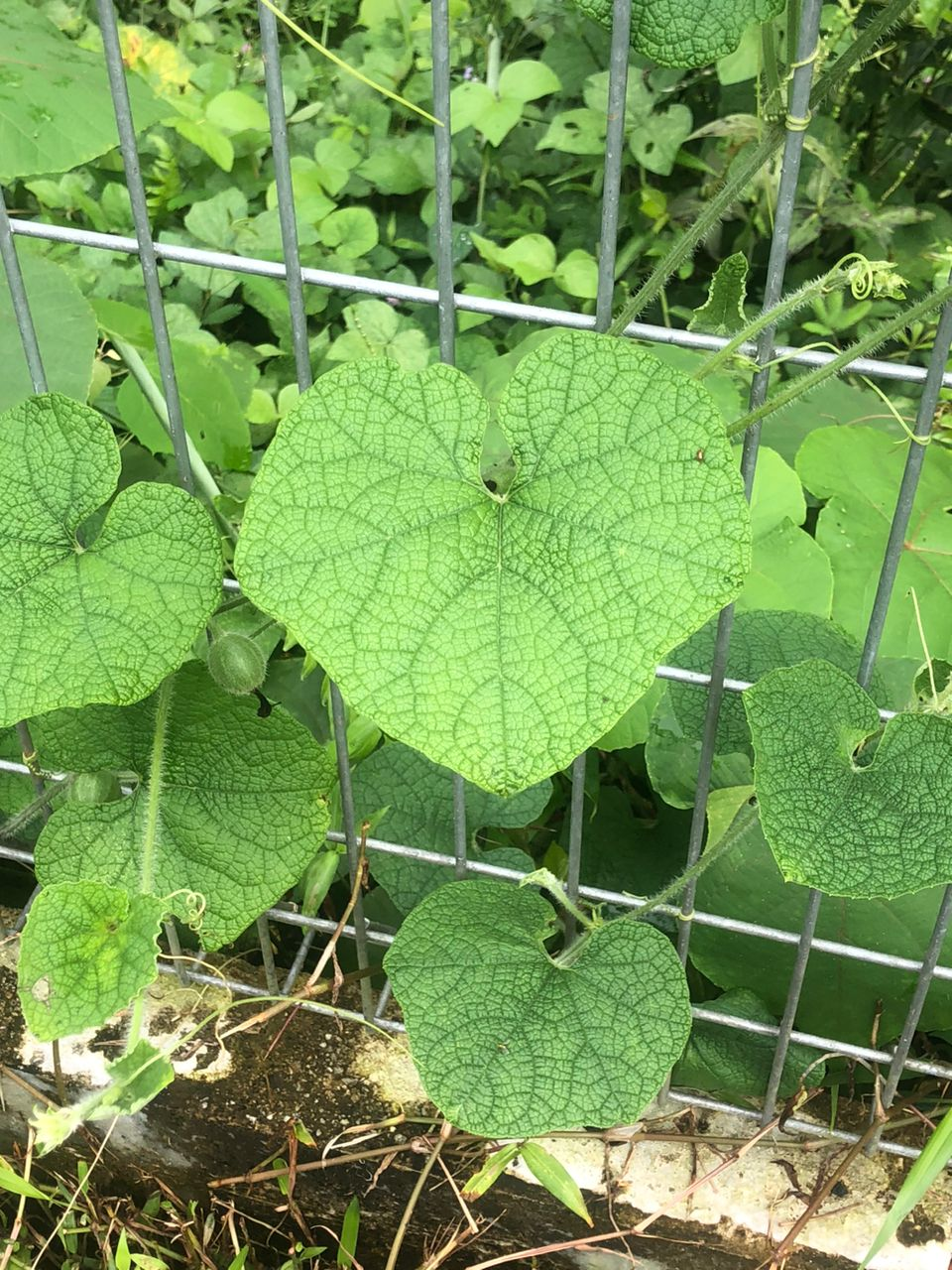

Scientific classification
- Kingdom: Plantae
- Clade: Tracheophytes
- Clade: Angiosperms
- Clade: Eudicots
- Clade: Rosids
- Order: Cucurbitales
- Family: Cucurbitaceae
- Genus: Trichosanthes
- Species: T. scabra

Binomial name
- Trichosanthes scabra Lour.

Synonyms
- Gymnopetalum scabrum (Lour.) W.J.de Wilde & Duyfjes

= Trichosanthes scabra =

Species of flowering plant

Trichosanthes scabra is a species of flowering plant within the family Cucurbitaceae. It is native to Assam, Cambodia, China, Himalaya, India, Indonesia, Java, Laos, the Lesser Sunda Islands, Malaysia, Myanmar, the Philippines, Sri Lanka, Sulawesi, Thailand, and Vietnam.
