= Trichosanthes baviensis =

Scientific classification
- Kingdom: Plantae
- Clade: Tracheophytes
- Clade: Angiosperms
- Clade: Eudicots
- Clade: Rosids
- Order: Cucurbitales
- Family: Cucurbitaceae
- Genus: Trichosanthes
- Species: T. baviensis

Binomial name
- Trichosanthes baviensis Gagnep.

Species of flowering plant

Trichosanthes baviensis is a climbing plant in the family of Cucurbitaceae. No subspecies are listed in the Catalogue of Life. It was described from the Ba Vi area in northern Vietnam (where its name is qua lâu Ba Vì) and also occurs in southern China.
