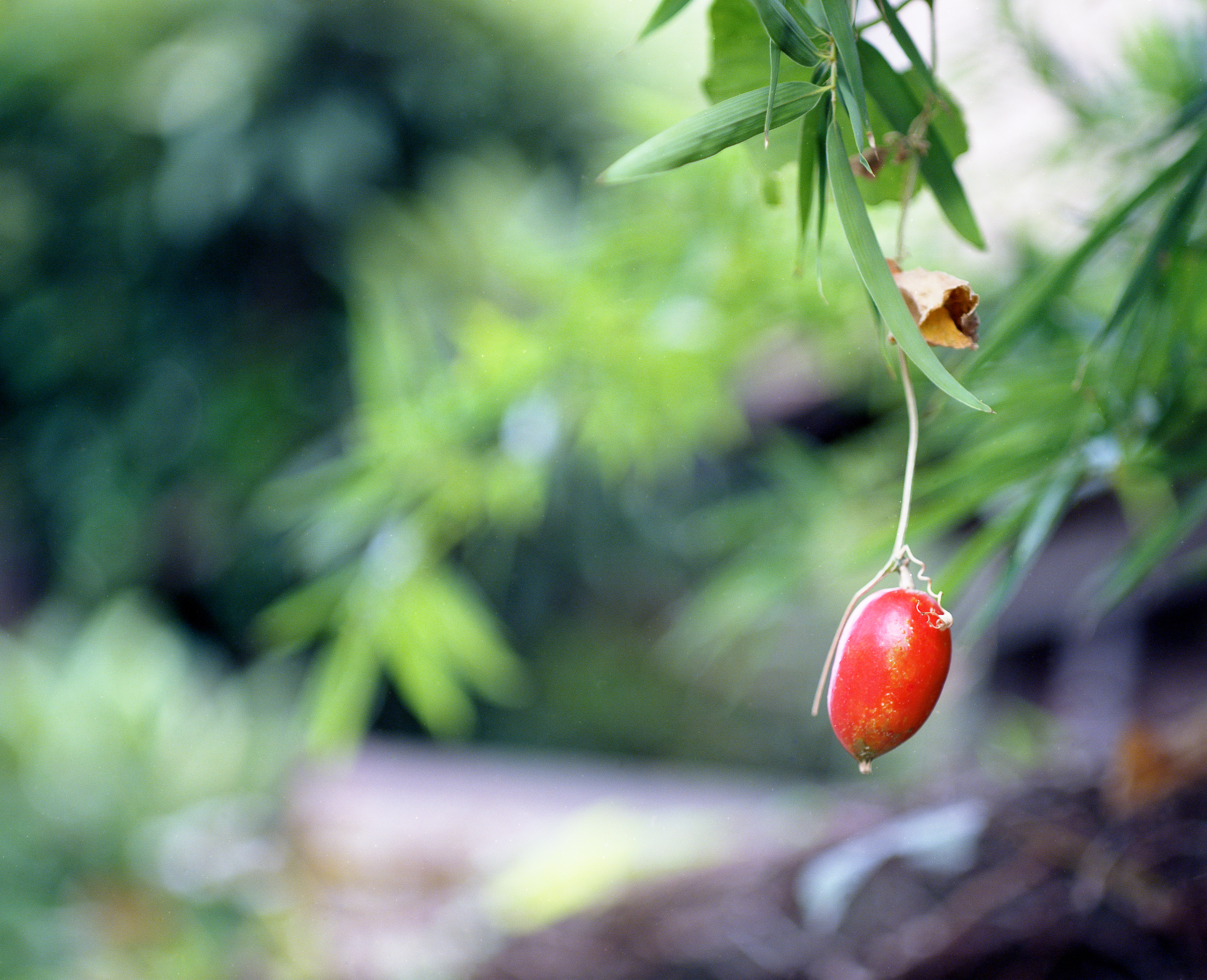

Scientific classification
- Kingdom: Plantae
- Clade: Tracheophytes
- Clade: Angiosperms
- Clade: Eudicots
- Clade: Rosids
- Order: Cucurbitales
- Family: Cucurbitaceae
- Genus: Trichosanthes
- Species: T. pilosa

Binomial name
- Trichosanthes pilosa Lour.

Synonyms
- Anguina pilosa (Lour.) Kuntze

= Trichosanthes pilosa =

Japanese snake gourd

Species of flowering plant

Trichosanthes pilosa is a species of flowering plant in the family Cucurbitaceae. It is a tropical or semitropical vine bearing an edible fruit. It is native to Japan, Taiwan, India, Malaysia, Vietnam, the Philippines, China (Guangdong, Guangxi, Hainan, Hunan, Jiangxi, Sichuan, Xizang (Tibet), Zhejiang) and other parts of southeast Asia as well as in Australia. It is known in English as Japanese snake gourd (Note: Robinson and Decker-Walters (1997) p. 203-206: "Japanese snake gourd" preferred name for Trichosanthes ovigera, and Trichosanthes ovigera preferred definition for "japanese snake gourd".).

The Japanese snake gourd (T. pilosa), is very similar in its vegetative characters to the more widespread "snake gourd", Trichosanthes cucumerina, the flower and leaves of the two species are very similar but the fruit of T. pilosa are round to egg-shaped, about 7 cm long and not resembling a snake.
