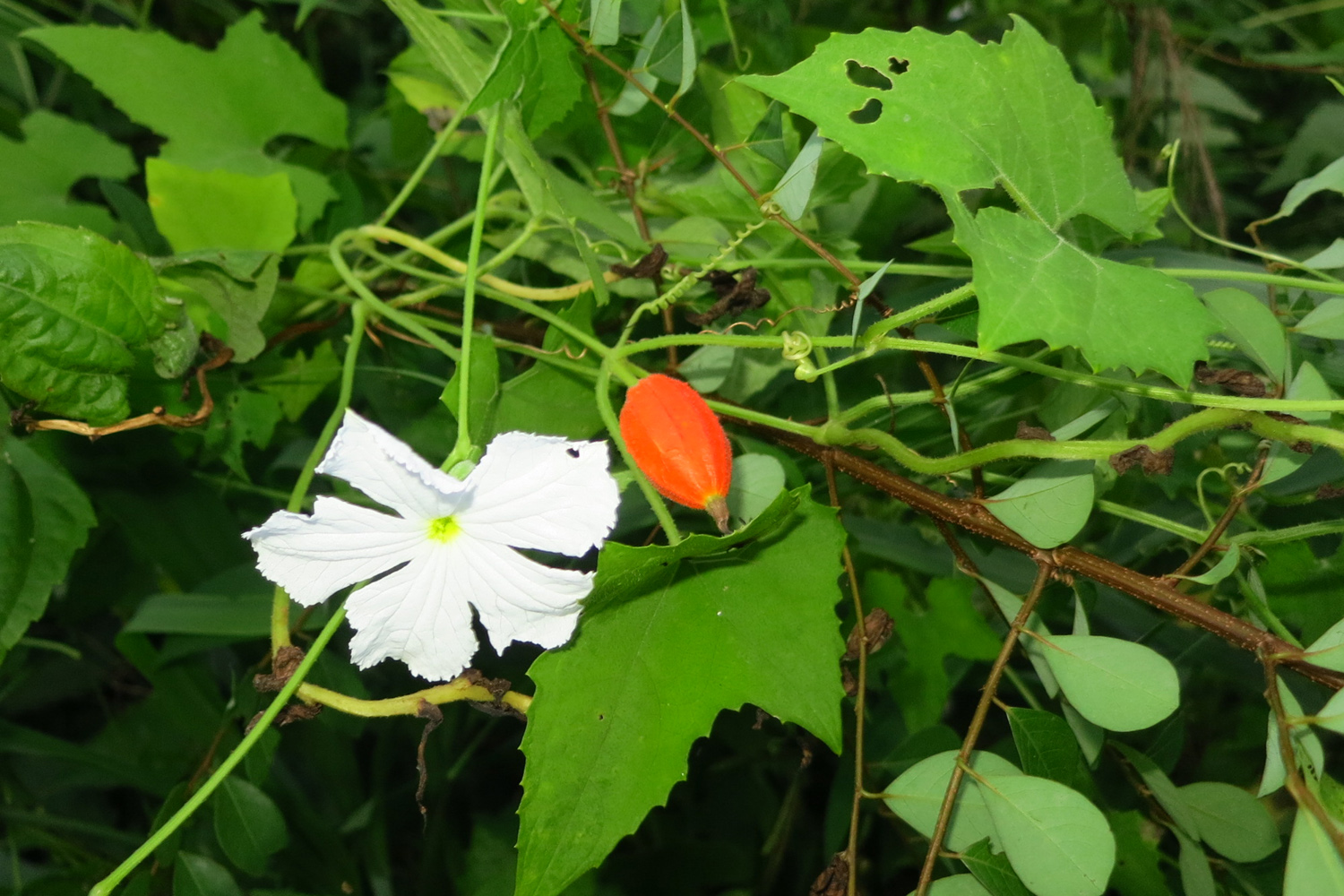
- T. cochinchinensis in Cat Tien National Park: forest margin (August)

Scientific classification
- Kingdom: Plantae
- Clade: Tracheophytes
- Clade: Angiosperms
- Clade: Eudicots
- Clade: Rosids
- Order: Cucurbitales
- Family: Cucurbitaceae
- Genus: Trichosanthes
- Species: T. cochinchinensis

Binomial name
- Trichosanthes cochinchinensis (Lour.) M. Roem.

Synonyms
- List: Tripodanthera cochinchinensis (Lour.) M. Roem.; Trichosanthes laciniata Ridl.; Trichosanthes fatoa Buch.-Ham.; Trichosanthes costata Bl.; Scotanthus tubiflorus Naud.; Scotanthus porteanus Naud.; Momordica tubiflora Roxb.; Momordica surculata Noronha; Momordica spicata Linné ex Sm.; Gymnopetalum quinquelobum Miq.; Gymnopetalum quinquelobatum Merr.; Gymnopetalum heterophyllum Kurz; Gymnopetalum cochinchinensis (Lour.) Kurz; Gymnopetalum chinense (Lour.) Merr.; Euonymus chinensis Lour.; Euonymus chinensis Lindl.; Cucumis tubiflorus Roxb. ex Wight & Arn.; Bryonia grandis Wall.; Bryonia cochinchinensis Lour.

= Trichosanthes cochinchinensis =

Species of flowering plant

Trichosanthes cochinchinensis is a climbing plant in the family Cucurbitaceae, but the name may be unresolved, with The Plant List indicating that Gymnopetalum cochinchinense is a synonym of G. chinense (Lour.) Merr. No subspecies are listed in the Catalogue of Life, which records its distribution as: China (Guangxi, Guangdong, Hainan, Yunnan), India (including South Andaman, North Nicobar), Nepal to Assam, Bhutan, Myanmar, Indonesia (Java, Sumatra, Sulawesi, Lesser Sunda Islands), Peninsular Malaysia, Borneo, Singapore, Java, Philippines, Laos, Thailand and Vietnam. In Vietnamese its name is dây cứt quạ.

== Description ==
Under the name "G. cochinchinensis" this plant has been described as having: incised pubescent leaves, white single flowers (circa 30 mm diameter) and red/red-orange fruit which are typically 30–50 mm long with approximately 10 ribs.
