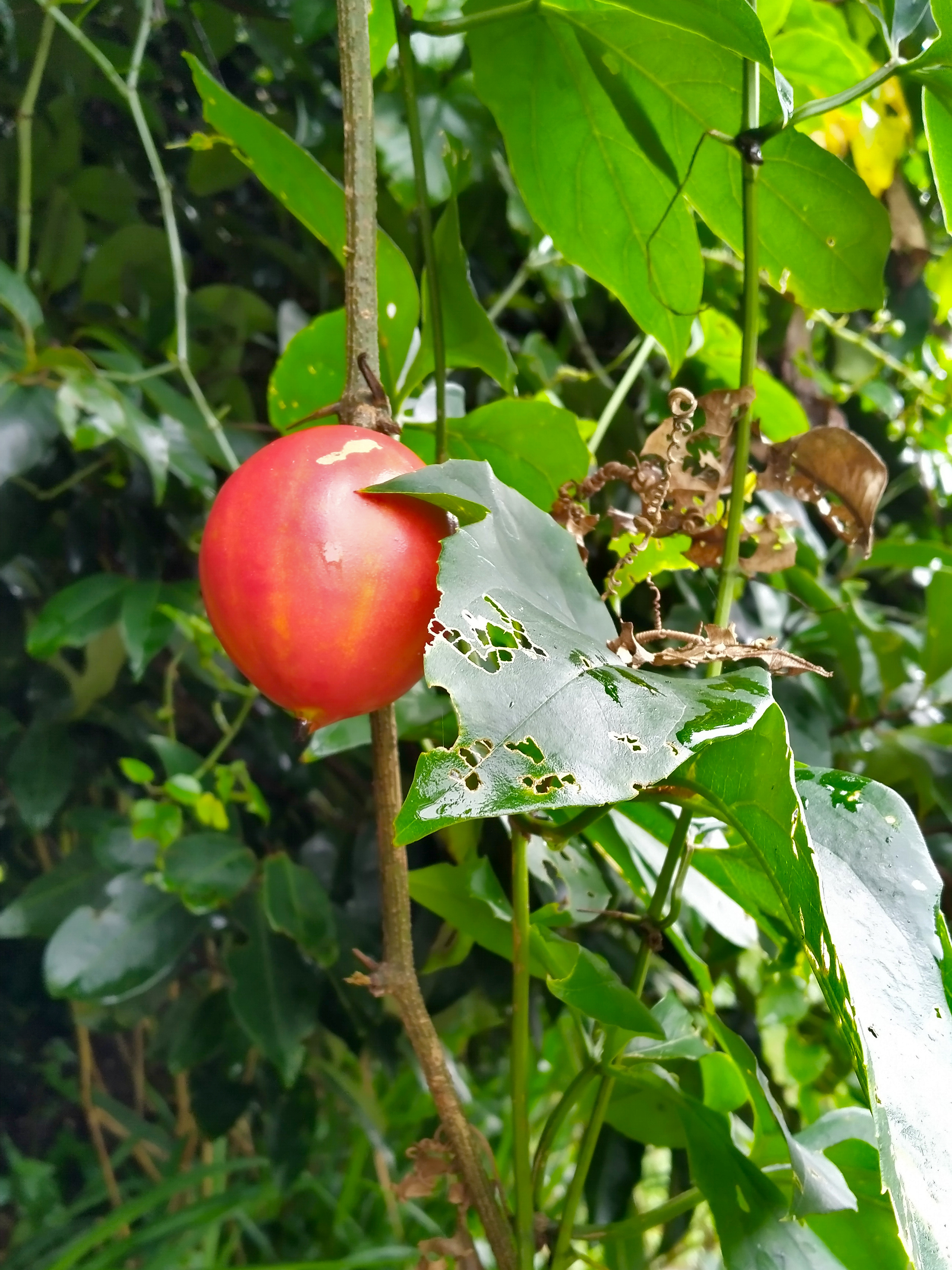
- Ripe fruit

Conservation status
- Least Concern (NCA)

Scientific classification
- Kingdom: Plantae
- Clade: Tracheophytes
- Clade: Angiosperms
- Clade: Eudicots
- Clade: Rosids
- Order: Cucurbitales
- Family: Cucurbitaceae
- Genus: Trichosanthes
- Species: T. pentaphylla

Binomial name
- Trichosanthes pentaphylla Benth.

= Trichosanthes pentaphylla =

Red gourd

Species of flowering plant

Trichosanthes pentaphylla, commonly known as red gourd, is a species of plants in the family Cucurbitaceae found only in coastal northeast Queensland, Australia. It is a tendril climber up to 15 m (49 ft) long and 4 cm (1.6 in) stem diameter. The leaves are palmately divided with 3–5 leaflets, carried on a petiole up to 7 cm (2.8 in) long. The species is dioecious, meaning that male and female flowers are borne on separate plants; both are white with fringed petals and about 4 cm (1.6 in) diameter. The fruit is bright red, ovoid, and about 7 cm (2.8 in) long by 5 cm (2.0 in) wide. The plant was first described in 1867 by English botanist George Bentham.

== Conservation ==
This species is listed as least concern under the Queensland Government's Nature Conservation Act. As of 9 January 2025, it has not been assessed by the International Union for Conservation of Nature (IUCN).
