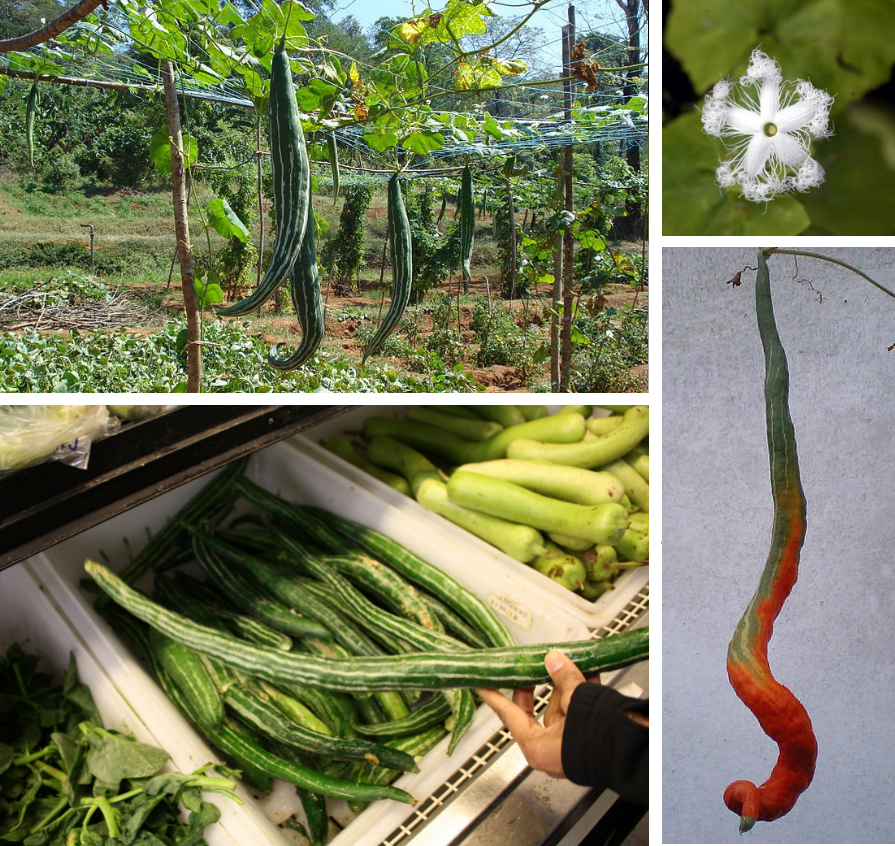

Scientific classification
- Kingdom: Plantae
- Clade: Tracheophytes
- Clade: Angiosperms
- Clade: Eudicots
- Clade: Rosids
- Order: Cucurbitales
- Family: Cucurbitaceae
- Genus: Trichosanthes
- Species: T. cucumerina

Binomial name
- Trichosanthes cucumerina L.

Synonyms
- Anguina cucumerina (L.) Kuntze; Cucumis anguinus (L.) L.; Involucraria anguina (L.) M.Roem.; Trichosanthes ambrozii Domin; Trichosanthes anguina L.; Trichosanthes brevibracteata Kundu; Trichosanthes colubrina J.Jacq.; Trichosanthes cucumerina var. anguina (L.) Haines; Trichosanthes pachyrrhachis Kundu; Trichosanthes pedatifolia Miq.; Trichosanthes petala Buch.-Ham. ex Wall.

= Trichosanthes cucumerina =

Snake gourd

Species of vine

Trichosanthes cucumerina, also called as Pudalangai (புடலங்காய்) is a tropical or subtropical vine. Its variety T. cucumerina var. anguina raised for its strikingly long fruit. In Asia, it is eaten immature as a vegetable much like the summer squash and in Africa, the reddish pulp of mature snake gourd is used as an economical substitute for tomato. Common names for the cultivated variety include snake gourd (Note: Robinson and Decker-Walters (1997) p. 203-206: "Snake gourd" preferred name for Trichosanthes cucumerina, and Trichosanthes cucumerina preferred definition for "snake gourd".), serpent gourd, chichinda padwal, Podalanga and Snake Tomato.

Trichosanthes cucumerina is found in the wild across much of South and Southeast Asia, including India, Bangladesh, Nepal, Pakistan, Sri Lanka, Indonesia, Malaysia, Myanmar(Burma) and southern China (Guangxi and Yunnan). It is also regarded as native in northern Australia. and naturalized in Florida, parts of Africa and on various islands in the Indian and Pacific Oceans.

Formerly, the cultivated form was considered a distinct species, T. anguina, but it is now generally regarded as conspecific with the wild populations, as they freely interbreed:

- Trichosanthes cucumerina var. anguina (L.) Haines – cultivated variant
- Trichosanthes cucumerina var. cucumerina – wild variant

== Description ==
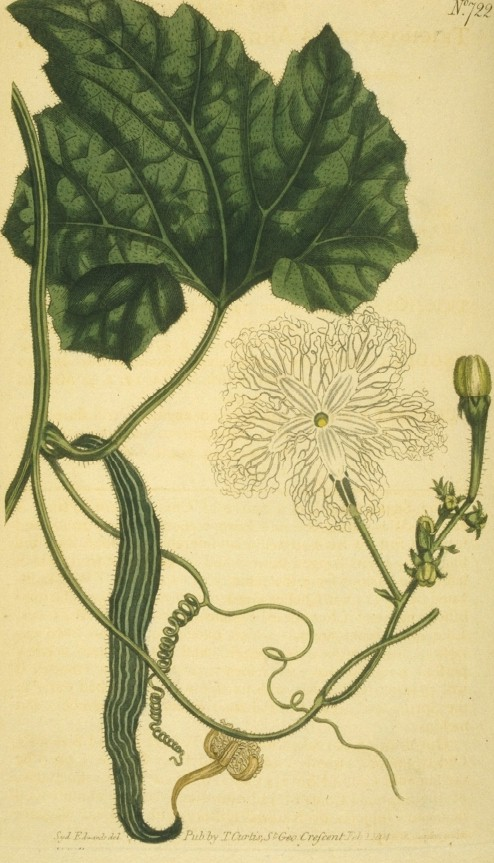
Plant diagram

Trichosanthes cucumerina is a monoecious annual vine climbing by means of tendrils. Leaves are palmately lobed, up to 25 cm long. Flowers are unisexual, white, opening at night, with long branching hairs on the margins of the petals. These hairs are curled up in the daytime when the flower is closed, but unfurl at night to form a delicate lacy display (see photos in gallery below). Fruits can be up to 200 cm long, deep red at maturity, hanging below the vine.

The related Japanese snake gourd (Trichosanthes pilosa, sometimes called T. ovigera or T. cucumeroides), very similar in vegetative morphology, but the fruit of T. pilosa is round to egg-shaped, only about 7 cm long.

== Cultivation ==
The fruit can be induced to grow straight by tying a weight to the end.

== Uses ==
=== Culinary ===
The common name "snake gourd" refers to the narrow, twisted, elongated fruit. The soft-skinned immature fruit can reach up to 150 cm (59 in) in length. Its soft, bland, somewhat mucilaginous flesh is similar to that of the luffa and the calabash. It is popular in the cuisines of South Asia and Southeast Asia and is now grown in some home gardens in Africa.

The primary culinary use of snake gourds is in curries and stews.

With some cultivars, the immature fruit has an unpleasant odor and a slightly bitter taste, both of which disappear in cooking. The fruit becomes too bitter to eat as it reaches maturity, but it does contain a reddish pulp that is used in Africa as a substitute for tomatoes. The shoots, tendrils and leaves are also eaten as greens.

=== Other ===
The dried gourds were traditionally used as a soap substitute in some parts of Asia.

== Gallery ==
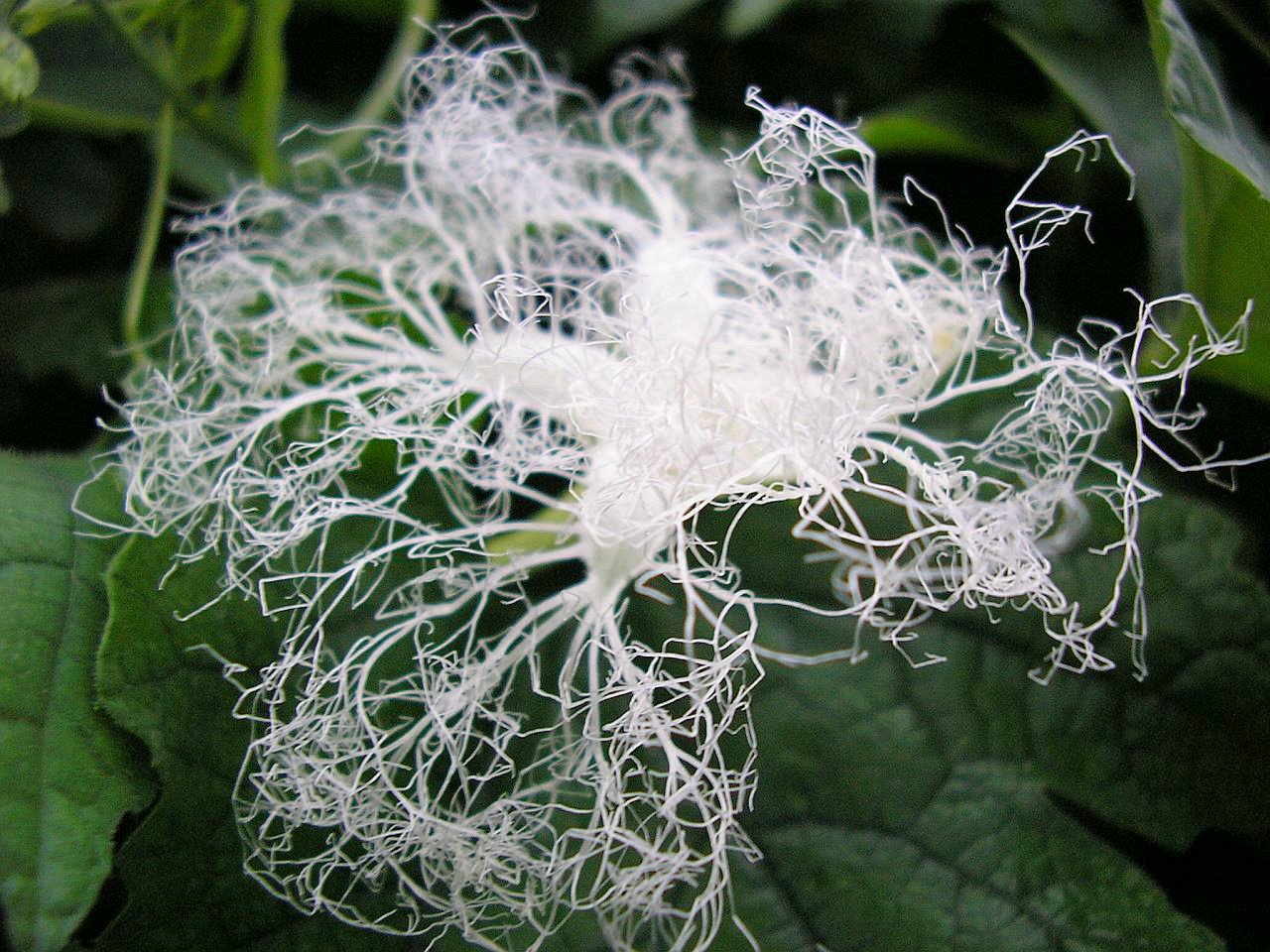
The lace-like flower of T. cucumerina opens only after dark. Here, it is shown almost completely unfurled.

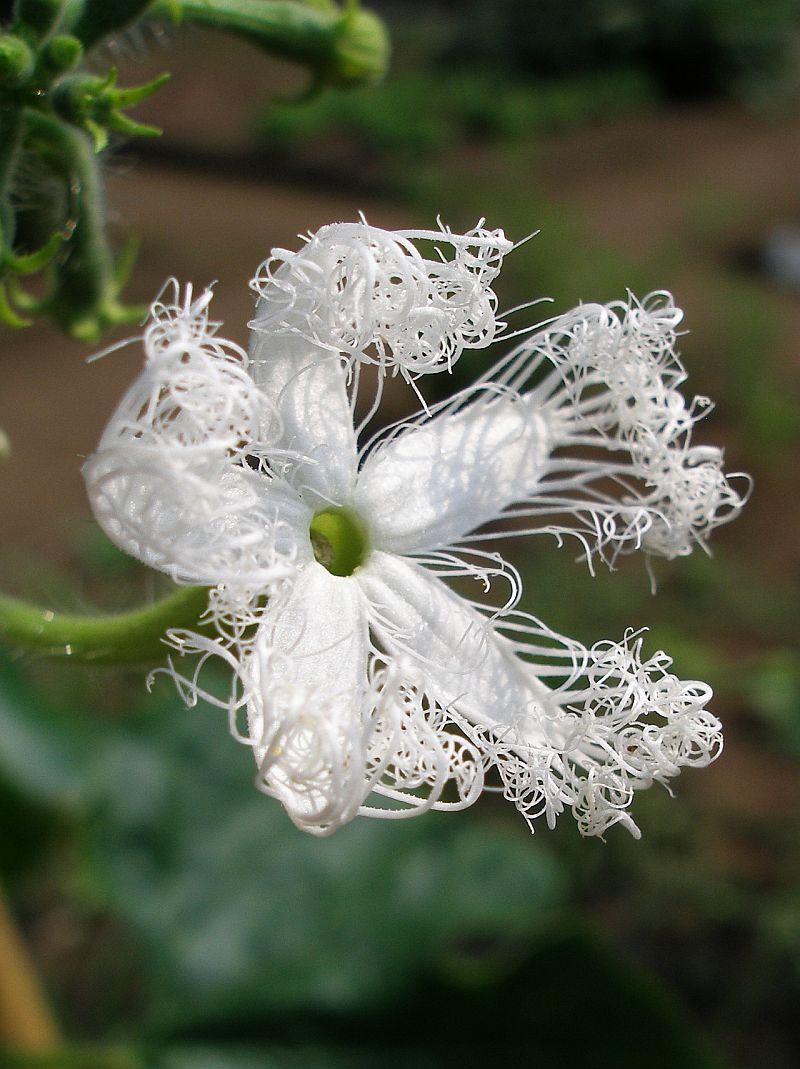
In the process of unfurling its fimbriate petals.

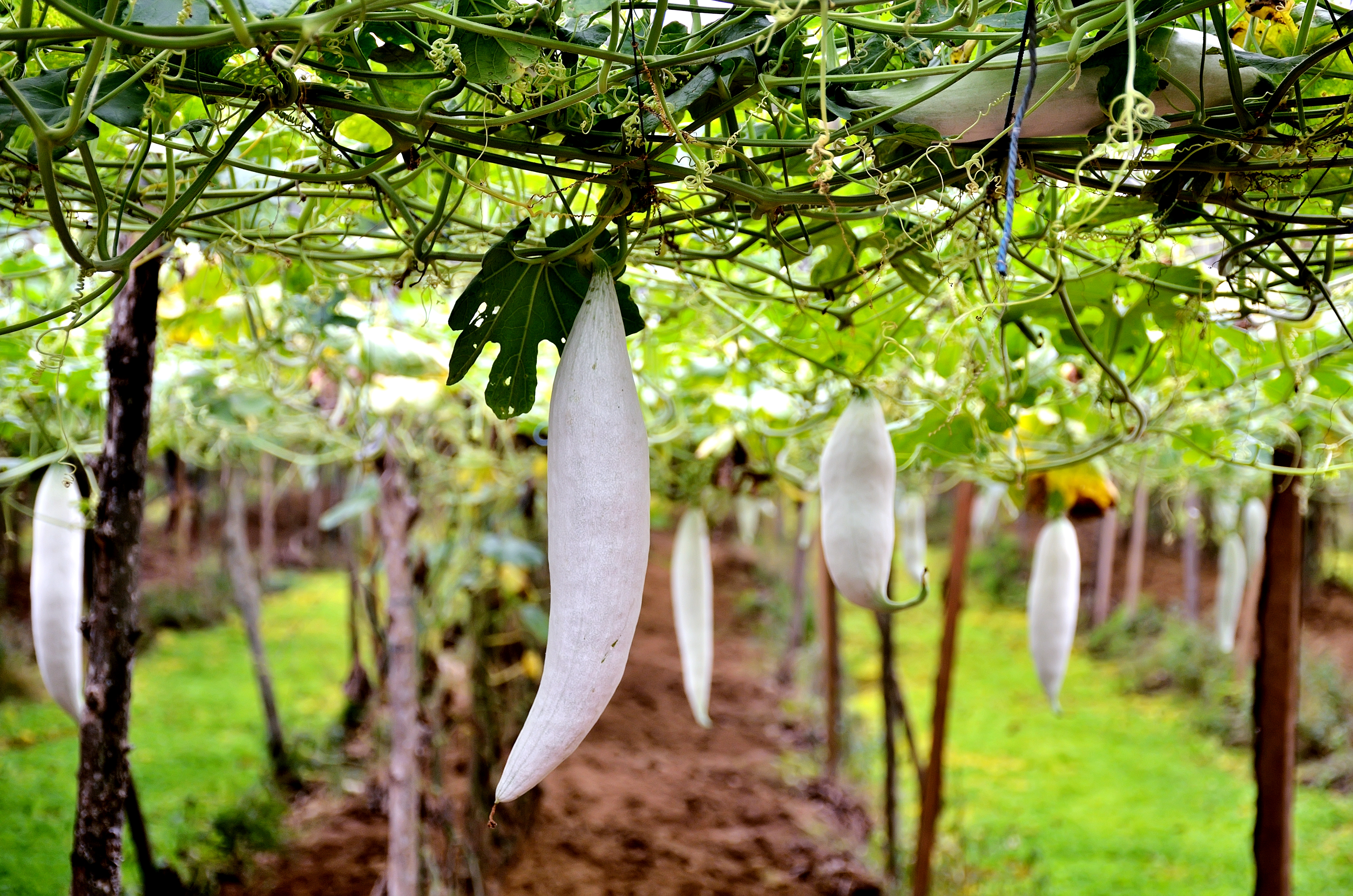
An edible immature snake gourd.

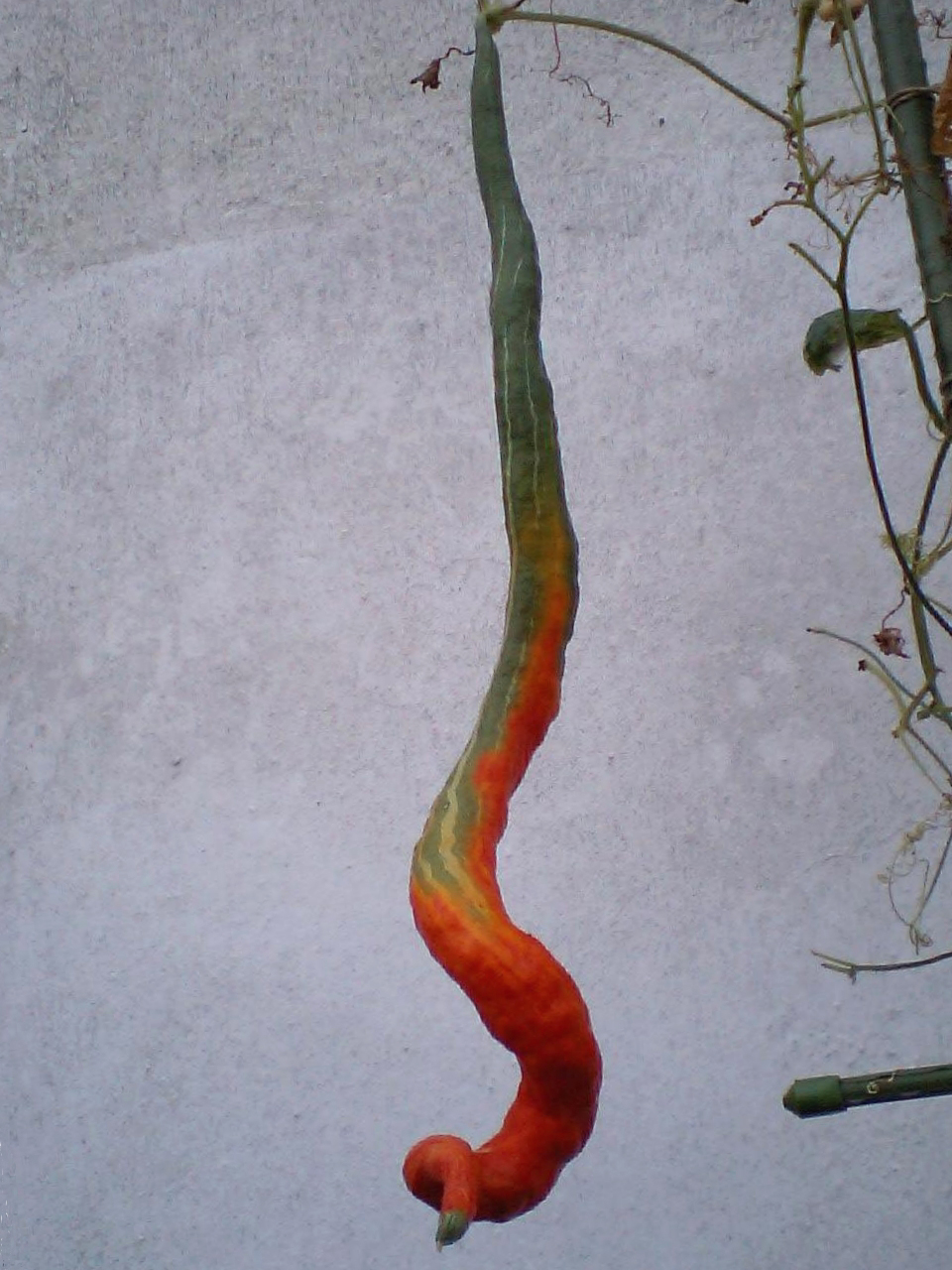
It twists and becomes orange-red while elongated and ripened.

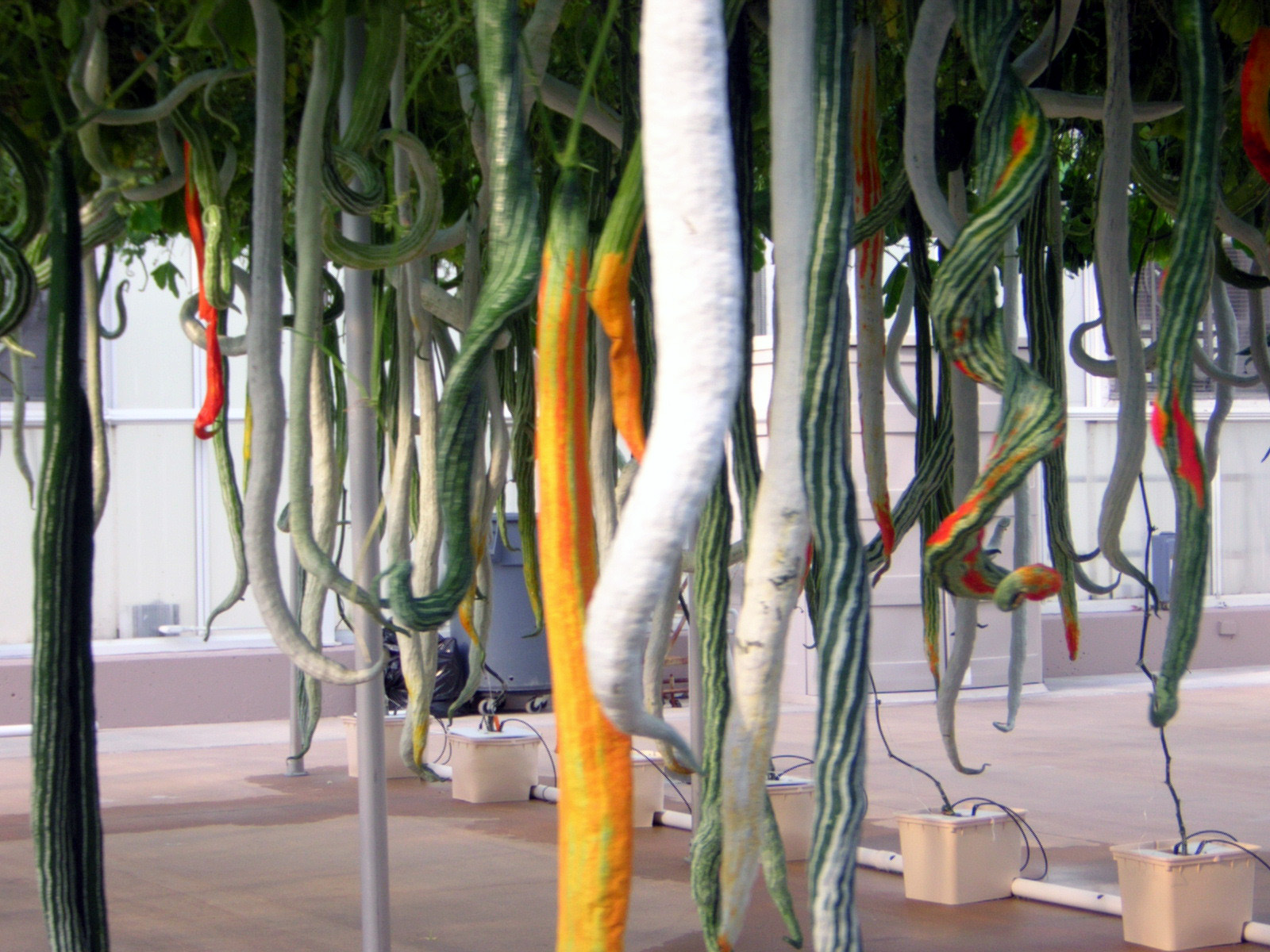
Different maturity stages and shapes as seen in cultivation.

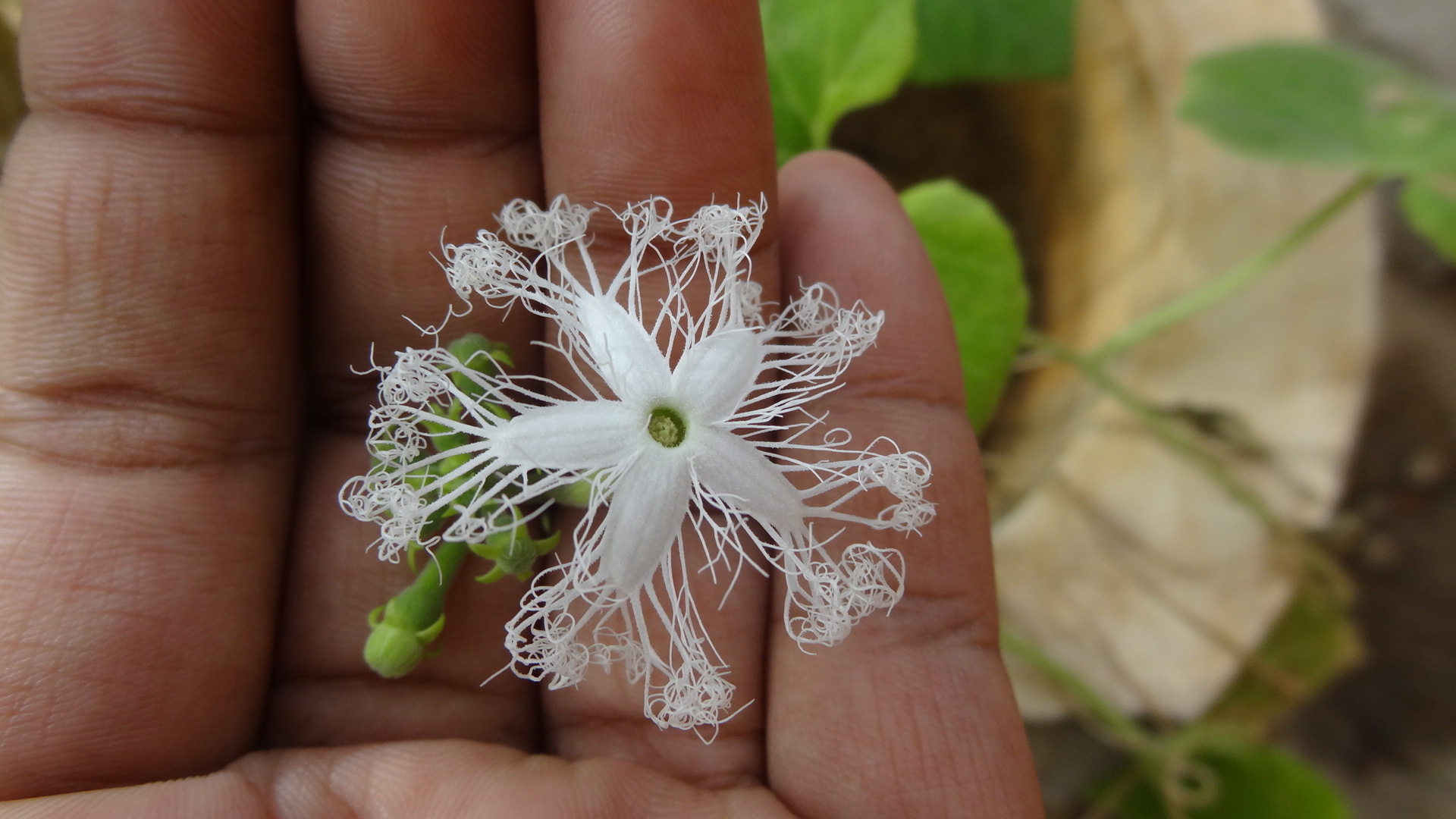
Flower and flower buds.

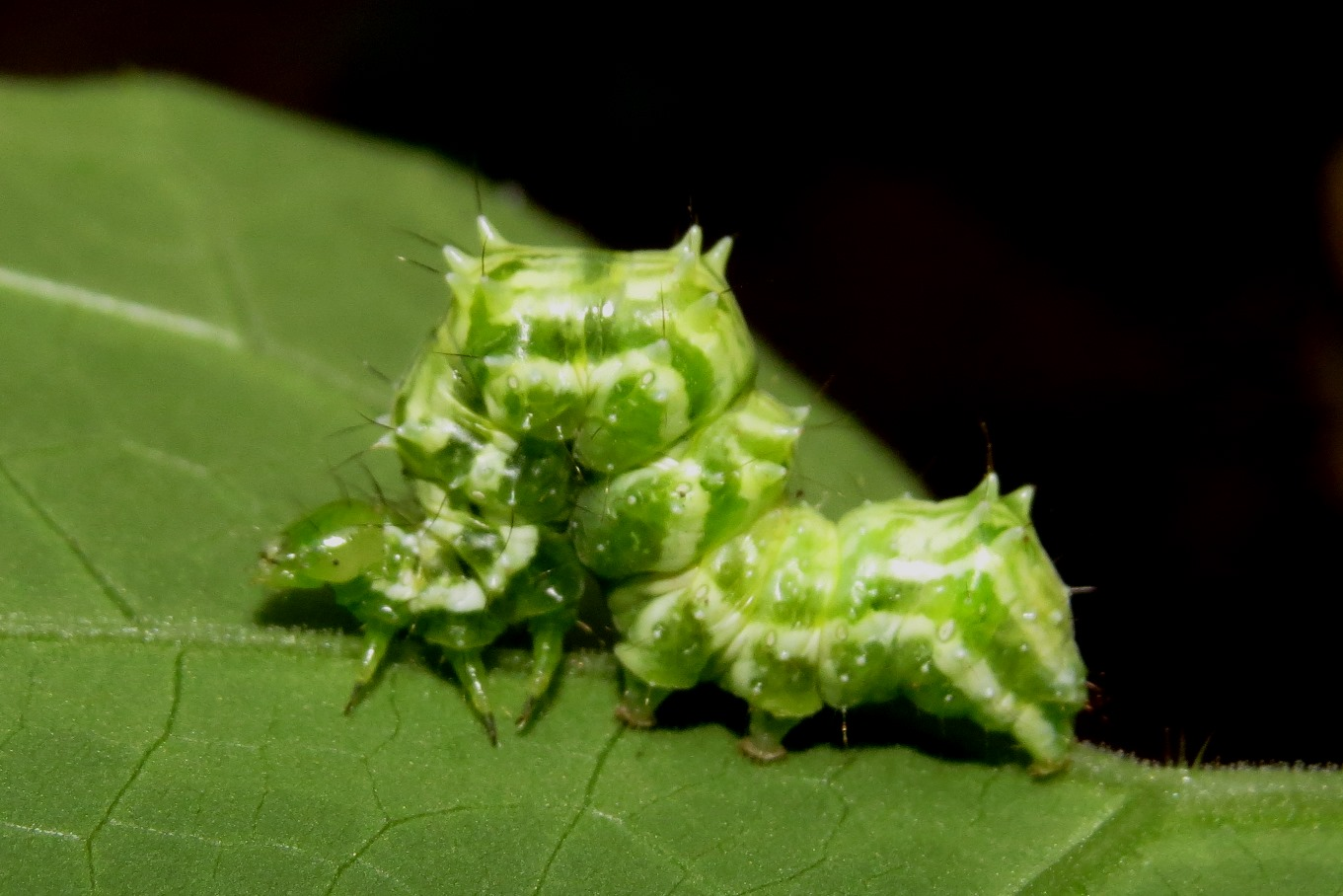
Snake gourd semilooper Anadevidia peponis larva, a major pest of T. cucumerina

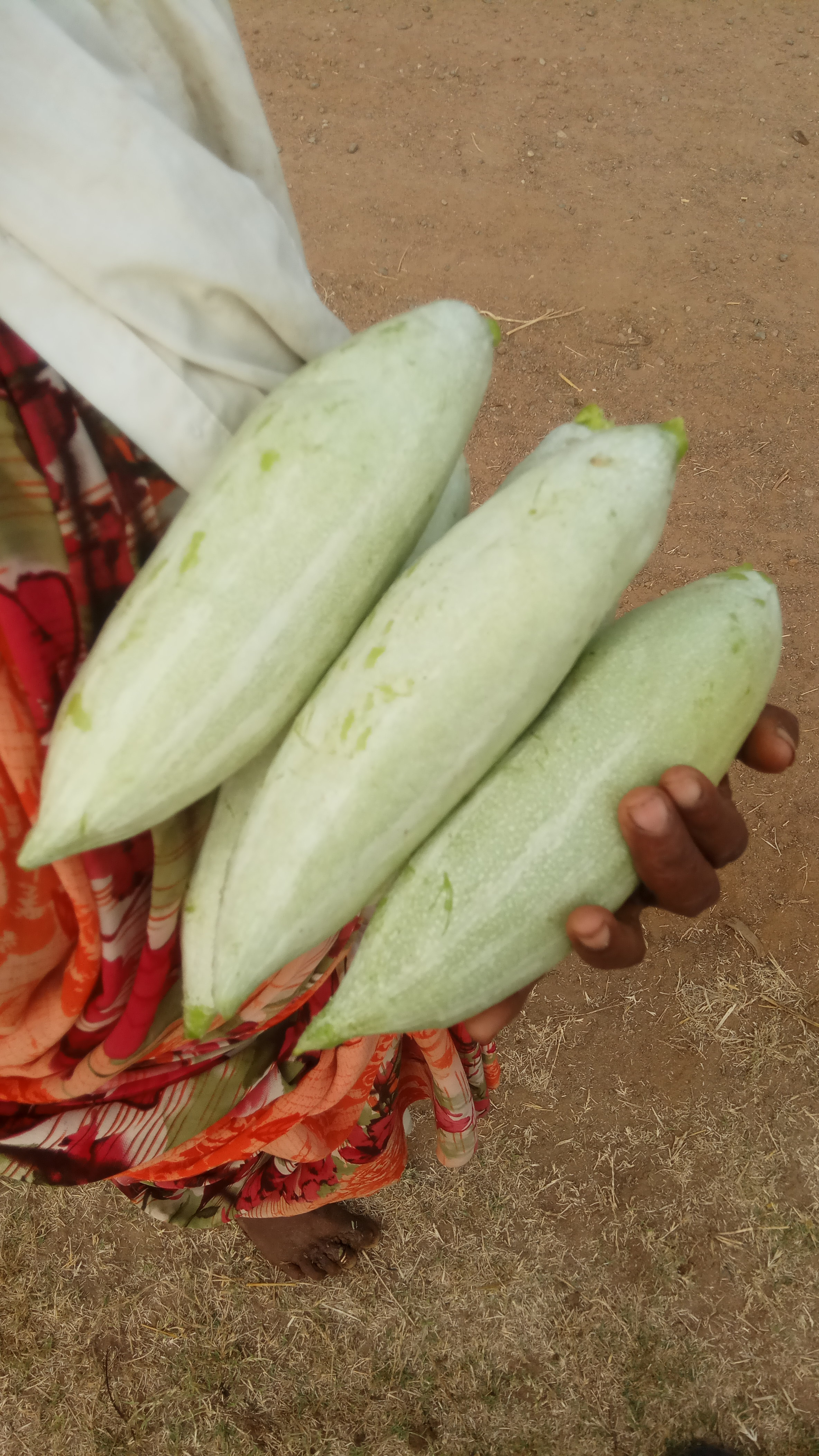
Freshly harvested snake gourd from India.

== See also ==
- Trichosanthes kirilowii, Chinese snake gourd (Note: Robinson and Decker-Walters (1997) p. 203-206: "Chinese snake gourd" preferred name for Trichosanthes kirilowii, and Trichosanthes kirilowii preferred definition for "chinese snake gourd".)
- Trichosanthes ovigera, Japanese snake gourd (Note: Robinson and Decker-Walters (1997) p. 203-206: "Japanese snake gourd" preferred name for Trichosanthes ovigera, and Trichosanthes ovigera preferred definition for "japanese snake gourd".)
- Lagenaria siceraria, some of its immature edible cultivars can be found as "snake gourds", not the preferred name. (Note: Decker-Walters (1996): "Gourd - Lagenaria. (...) Longissima (Baton, Long Club, Italian Edible, Cucuzzi, Cucuzzi Caravazzi, Snake, Flute, Serpent) - Vendor: Vilmorin. Characteristics: similar to Hercules Club but longer, edible at 1' long x 2" diameter but will grow to 6' long; from Italy. Similar: Hercules Club. 1885")
- Trichosanthes dioica, Pointed gourd or Parwal, also edible when immature.
