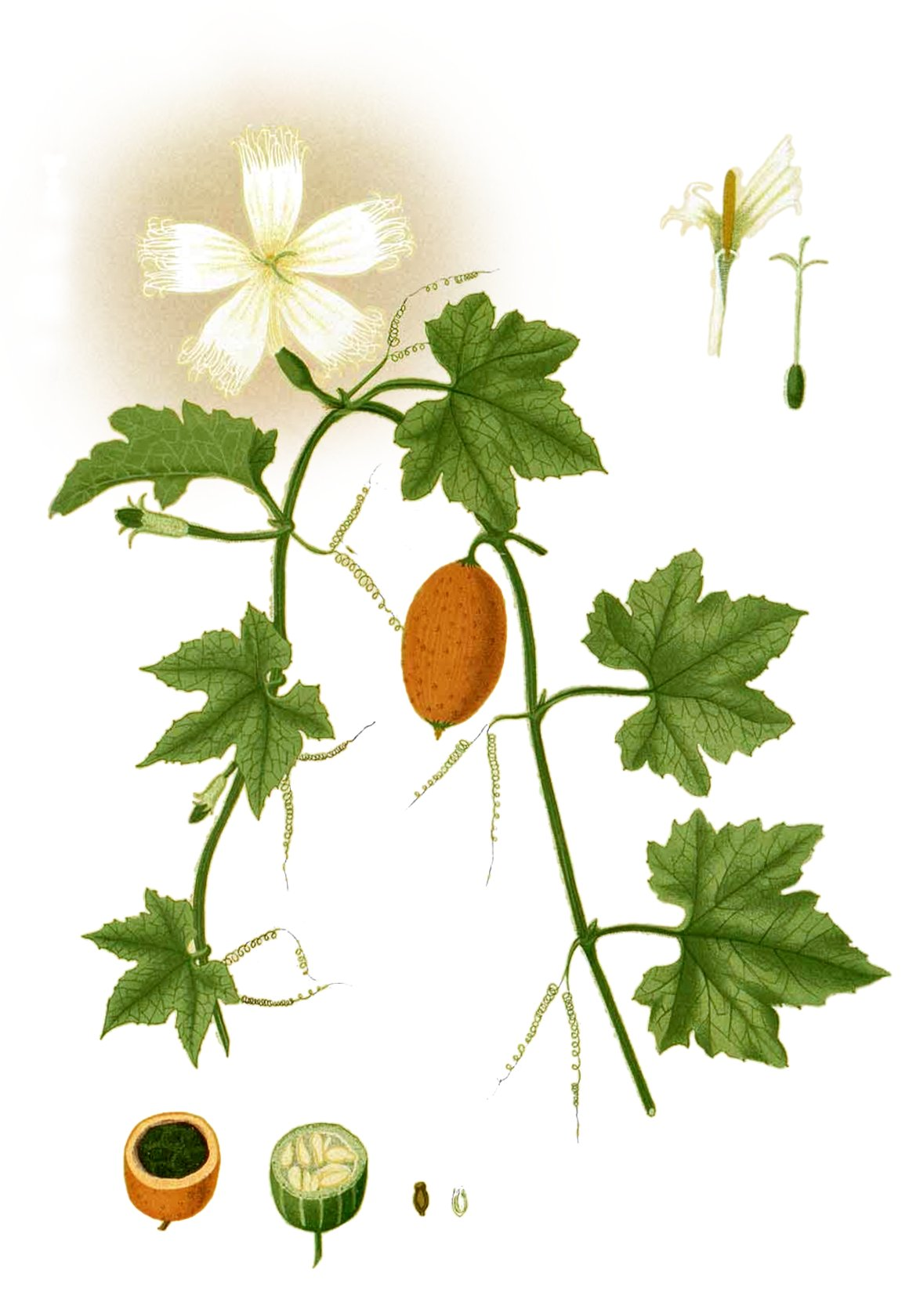
- Trichosanthes tricuspidata

Scientific classification
- Kingdom: Plantae
- Clade: Tracheophytes
- Clade: Angiosperms
- Clade: Eudicots
- Clade: Rosids
- Order: Cucurbitales
- Family: Cucurbitaceae
- Subfamily: Cucurbitoideae
- Tribe: Sicyoeae
- Genus: Trichosanthes; L.

Species
- See text

Synonyms
- Anguina Mill. Cucumeroides Gaertn. Eopepon Naudin; Involucraria Ser. Platygonia Naudin

= Trichosanthes =

Genus of plants

Trichosanthes is a genus of tropical and subtropical vines. They belong to the cucumber family (Cucurbitaceae), and are closely related to Gymnopetalum. Hodgsonia, formerly included here, is usually considered a well-distinct genus nowadays.

The shoots, tendrils, and leaves of some or possibly all species may be eaten as greens, and at least two species (serpent gourd, T. cucumerina, and pointed gourd, T. dioica) are grown commercially for their fleshy fruits used as vegetables, most popular in South Asia and Southeast Asia. At least two species (T. kirilowii and T. rosthornii) are grown for use in traditional Chinese medicine, where they are called the name gualou (Chinese: 瓜蒌; pinyin: guālóu). Trichosanthes is also known as a medicinal as well as poisonous plant in India. The herb has shown an ability to reduce chest congestion by breaking down phlegm and aiding in its removal from the lungs.

== Selected species ==
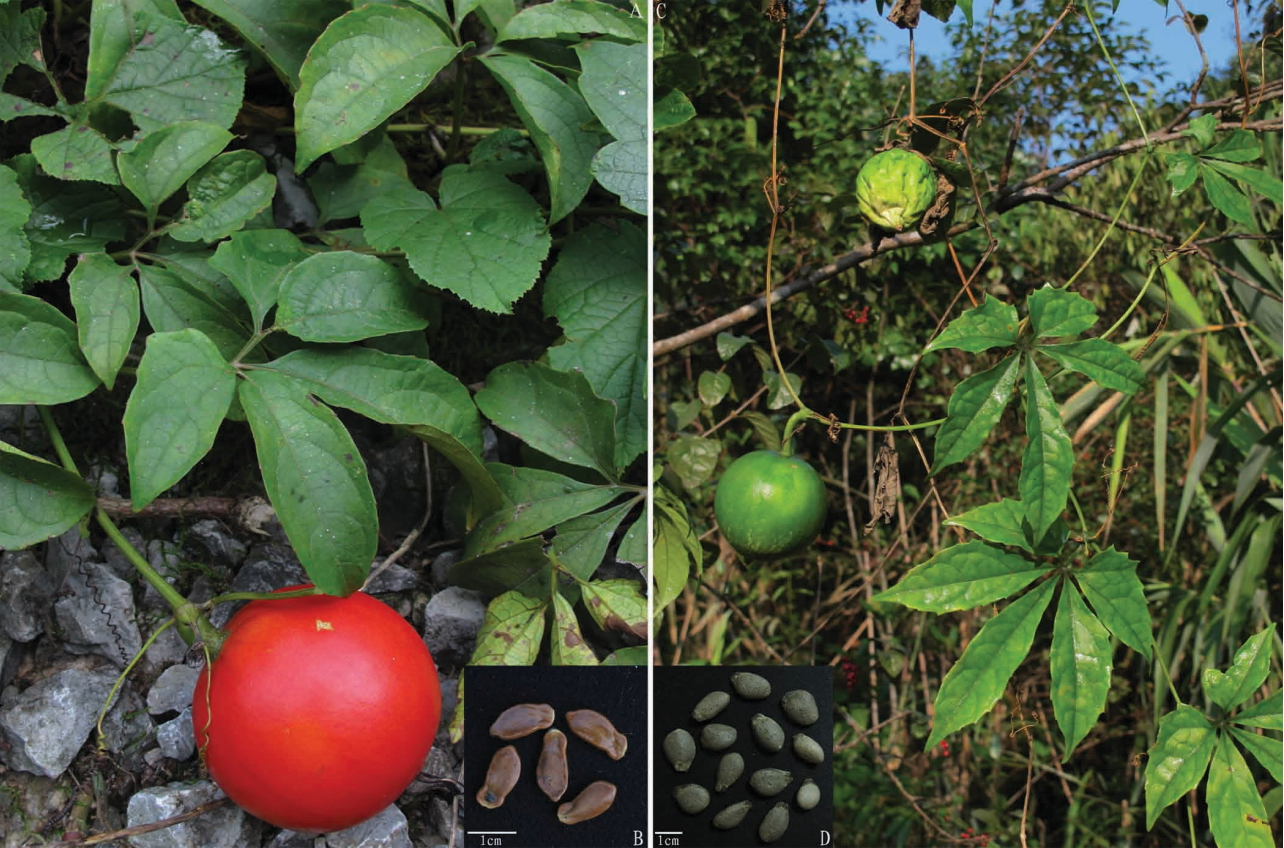
T. napoensis and T. pedata: habit and seeds

- Trichosanthes baviensis Gagnepain
- Trichosanthes cochinchinensis (Lour) M. Roem.
- Trichosanthes cucumerina – Serpent gourd, Padwal; dhunduli (Assamese); chichinga/chichinge (Bengali); paduvalakaayi (Kannada); padavalanga (Malayalam); purla (Sambalpuri); pathola (Sinhala); Pudol, Kurattai OR Sauri (Tamil); potlakaaya (Telugu)
  - Trichosanthes cucumerina var. anguina – Snake gourd
- Trichosanthes dioica – Pointed gourd, parwal (Hindi), potol / potals (eastern India & Northeastern Andhra)
- Trichosanthes dunniana Levl.
- Trichosanthes fissibracteata C.Y.Wu ex C.Y.Cheng & Yueh
- Trichosanthes globosa Blume
- Trichosanthes homophylla Hayata
- Trichosanthes kerrii Craib
- Trichosanthes kinabaluensis Rugayah
- Trichosanthes kirilowii – "gualou" (China) (= T. japonica)
- Trichosanthes laceribractea Hayata
- Trichosanthes lepiniana (Nuad.) Cogn.
- Trichosanthes metamorpha R.Z. Wang, N. Wei & Q.F. Wang - 异叶栝楼 (Chinese )
- Trichosanthes montana Rugayah
- Trichosanthes pedata Merr. & Chun
- Trichosanthes pendula Rugayah
- Trichosanthes pilosa (Ser.) Maxim in Franch. & Sav. - Japanese snake gourd; karasuuri[烏瓜] (Japanese)
- Trichosanthes pentaphylla F.Muell. ex Benth.
- Trichosanthes postarii W.J.de Wilde & Duyfjes
- Trichosanthes quinquangulata A.Gray
- Trichosanthes reticulinervis C.Y.Wu ex S.K.Chen
- Trichosanthes rosthornii Harms – "gualou" (China) (= T. uniflora)
- Trichosanthes rubiflos Thorel ex Cayla
- Trichosanthes rugatisemina C.Y.Cheng & Yueh
- Trichosanthes scabra Lour.
- Trichosanthes schlechteri Cogn. ex Harms
- Trichosanthes sepilokensis Rugayah
- Trichosanthes sericeifolia C.Y.Cheng & Yueh
- Trichosanthes subrosea C.Y.Cheng & Yueh
- Trichosanthes subvelutina F.Muell. ex Cogn.
- Trichosanthes tricuspidata Lour. (= T. bracteata, T. palmata)
- Trichosanthes truncata C.B.Clarke
- Trichosanthes villosa Blume – "baduyut" (Sundanese)
- Trichosanthes wallichiana (Ser.) Wight
- Trichosanthes wawraei (Ser.) Xianyu.W

In addition, several hybrids are known in this genus.

Formerly placed in Trichosanthes were for example Kedrostis foetidissima and Linnaeosicyos amara.

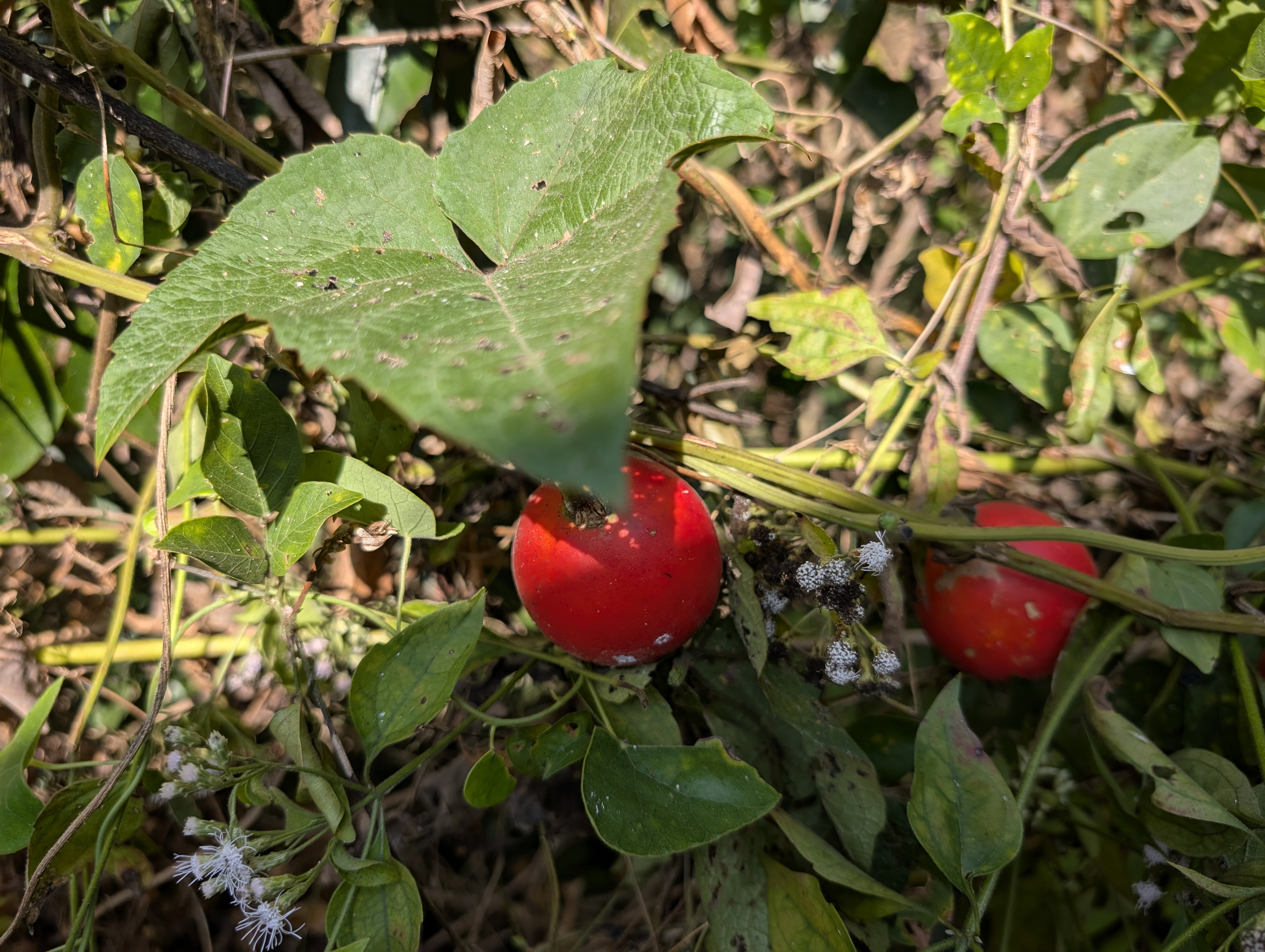

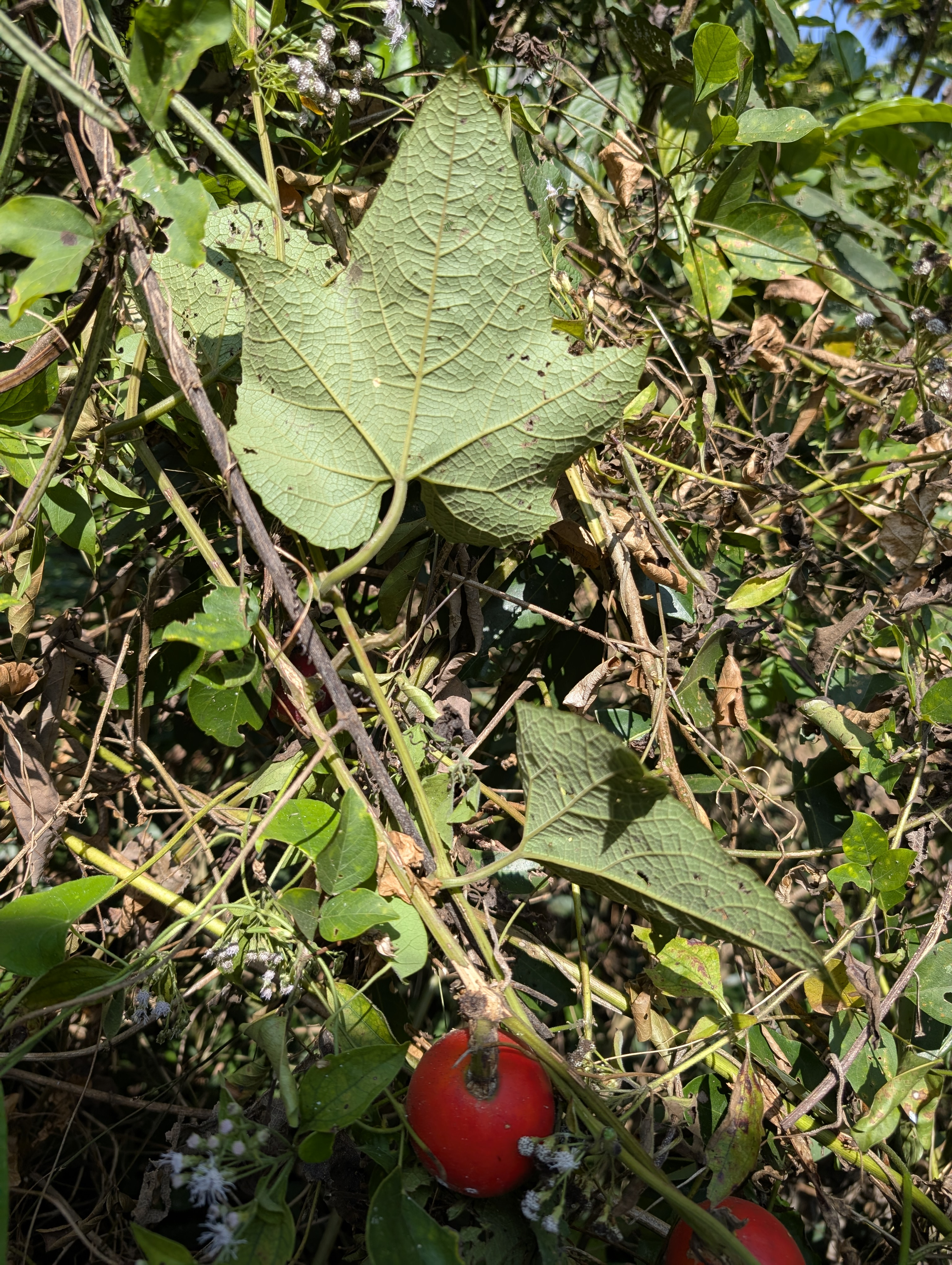

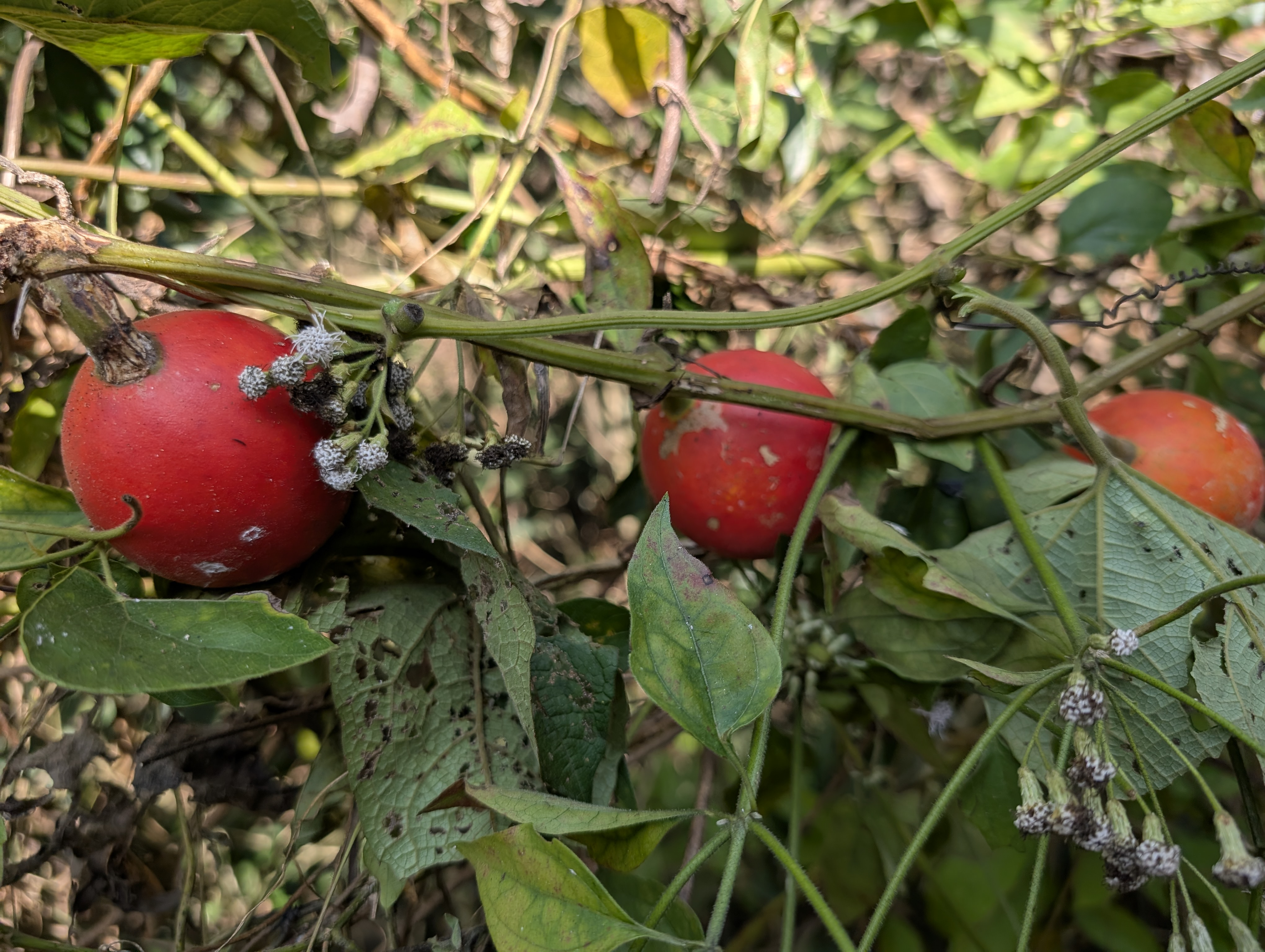

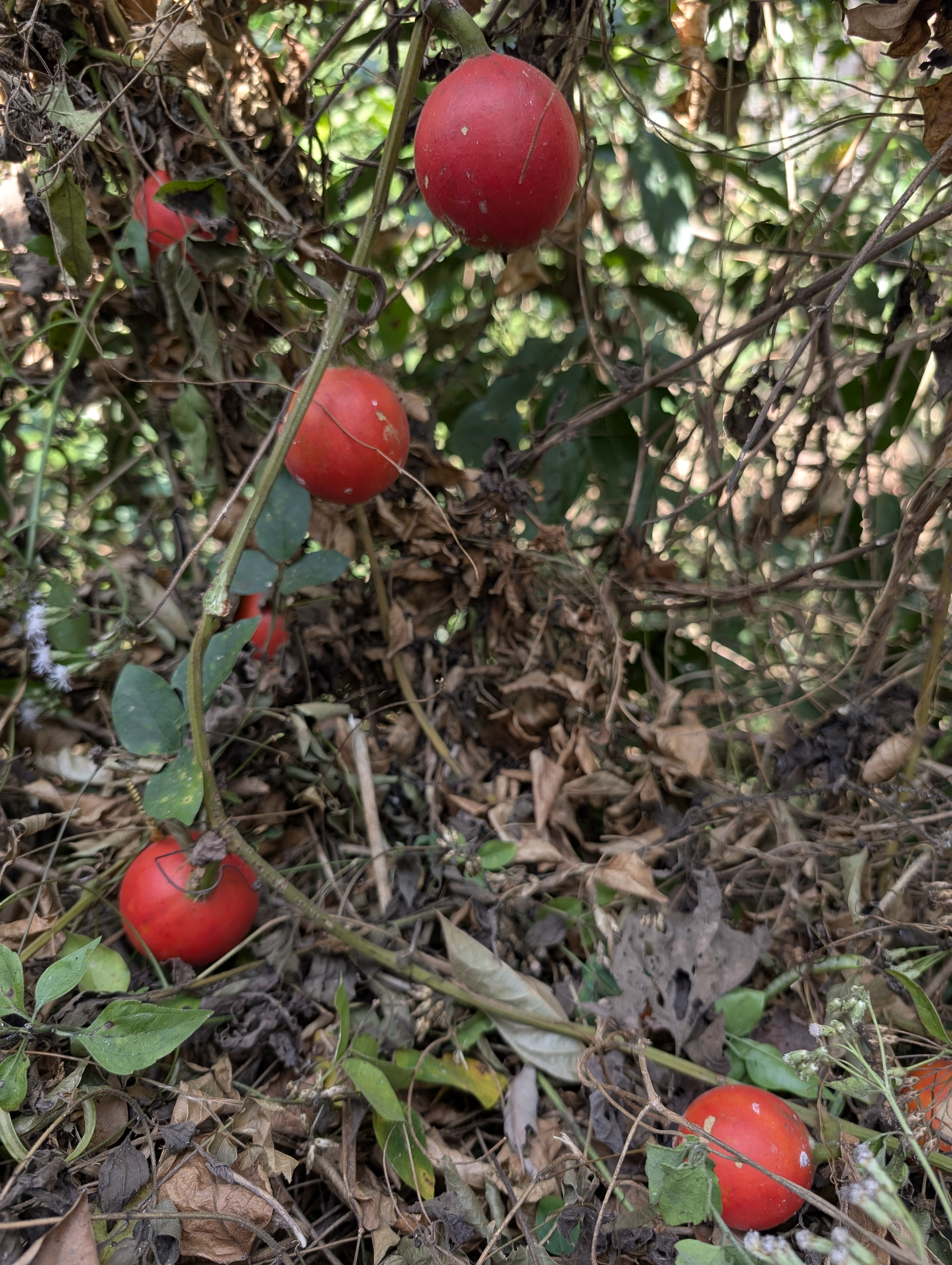

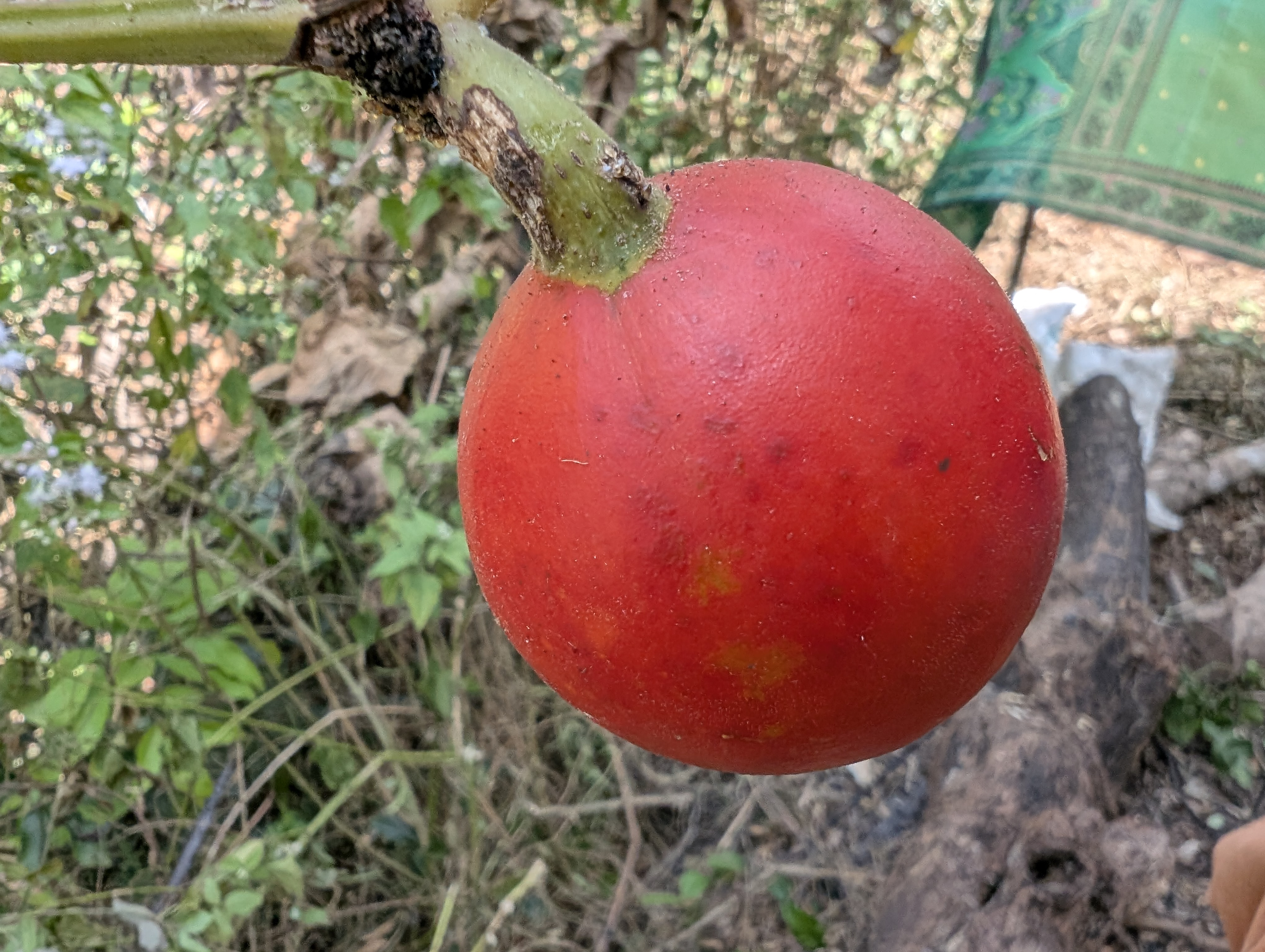

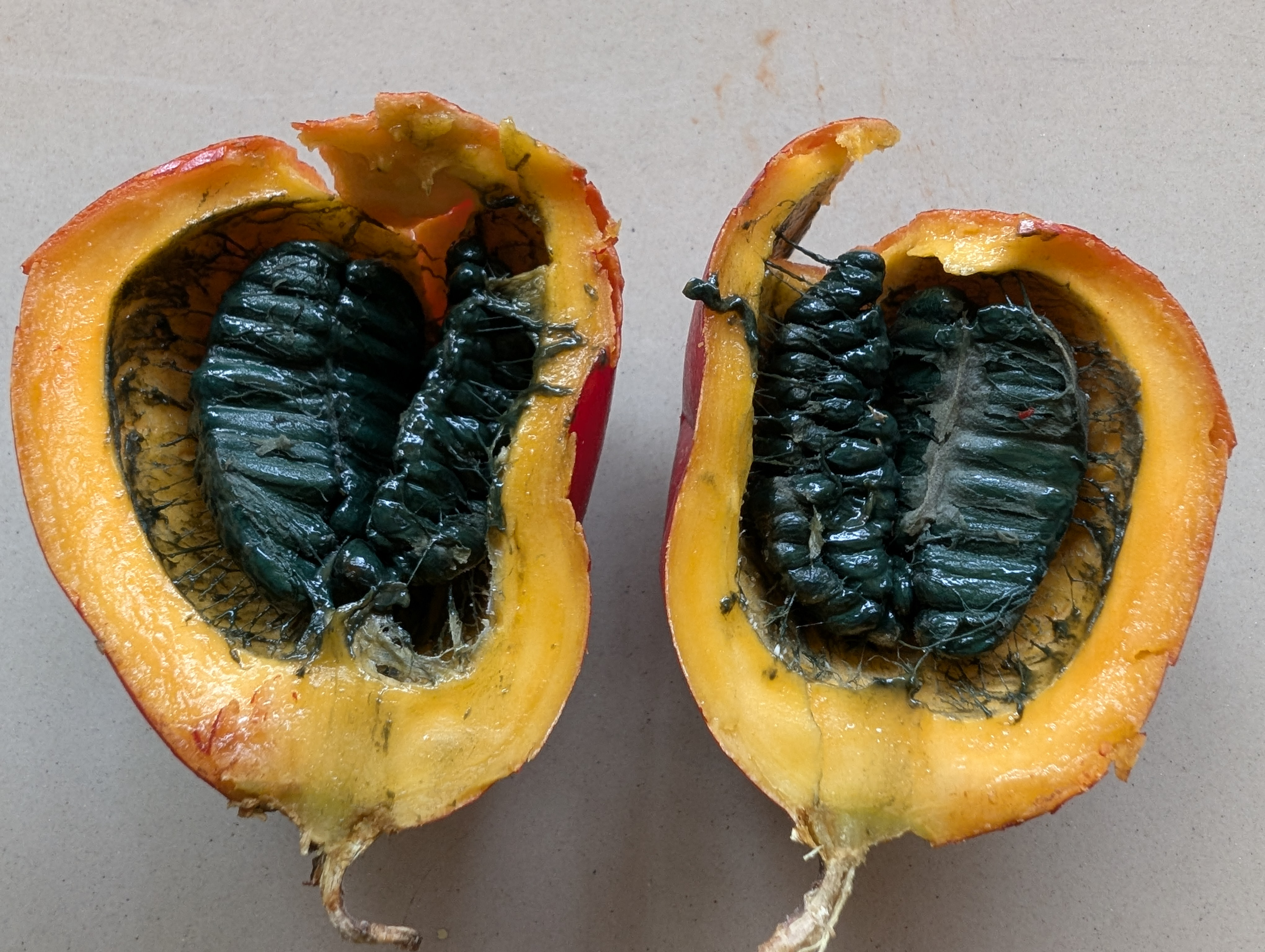
