= Maithil cuisine =

Ethnic cuisine of the Maithil people

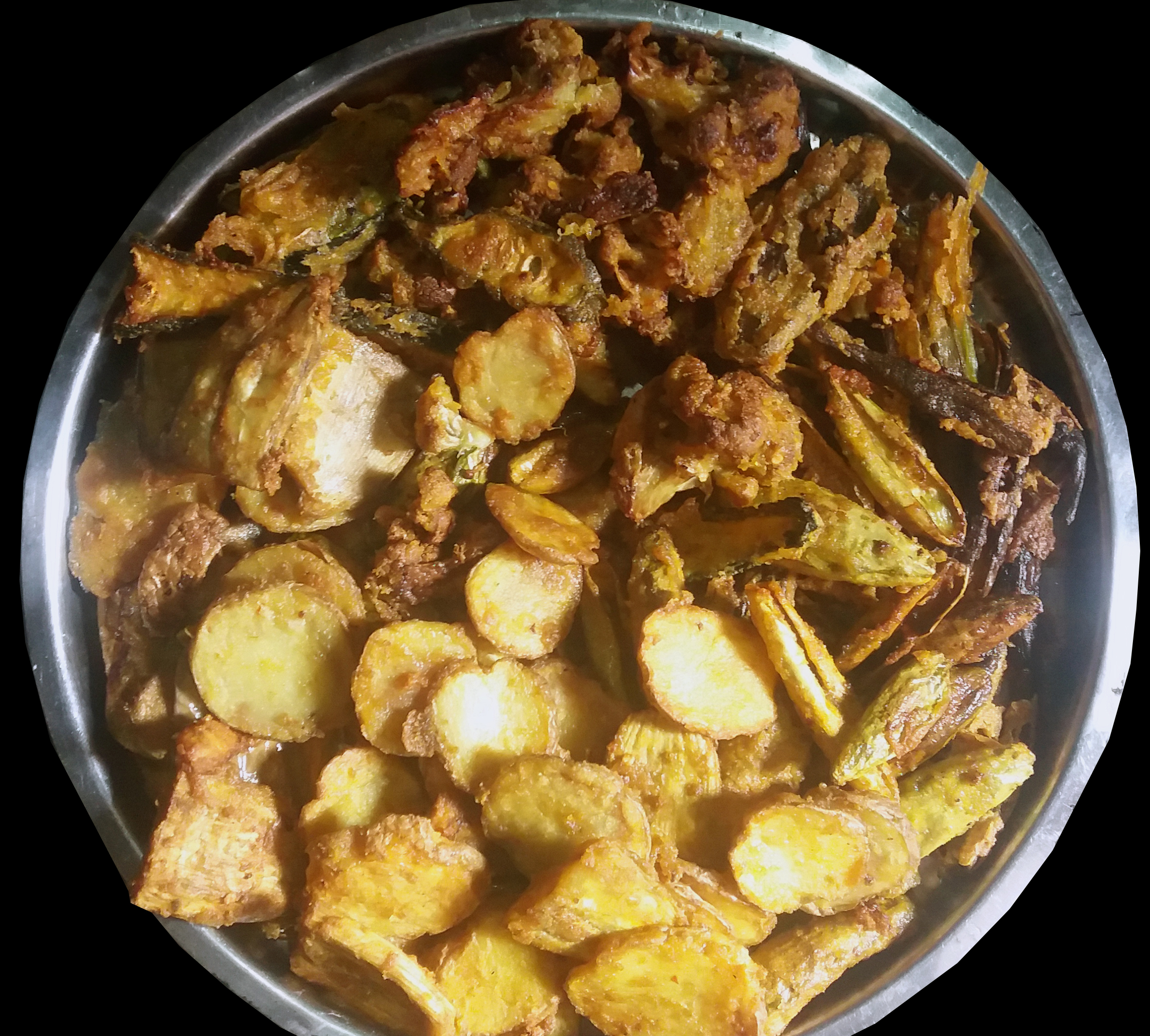
- Tarua, a popular Maithil dish

Maithil cuisine, also known as Mithila cuisine, is the traditional cooking style of Maithils residing in the Mithila region of India and Nepal. It is a part of Indian and Nepalese cuisine.

Maithil cuisine comprises a broad repertoire of rice, wheat, fish and meat dishes and the use of various spices, herbs and natural edibles. The cuisine is categorized by types of food for various events, from banquets, to weddings and parties, festival foods, and travel foods.

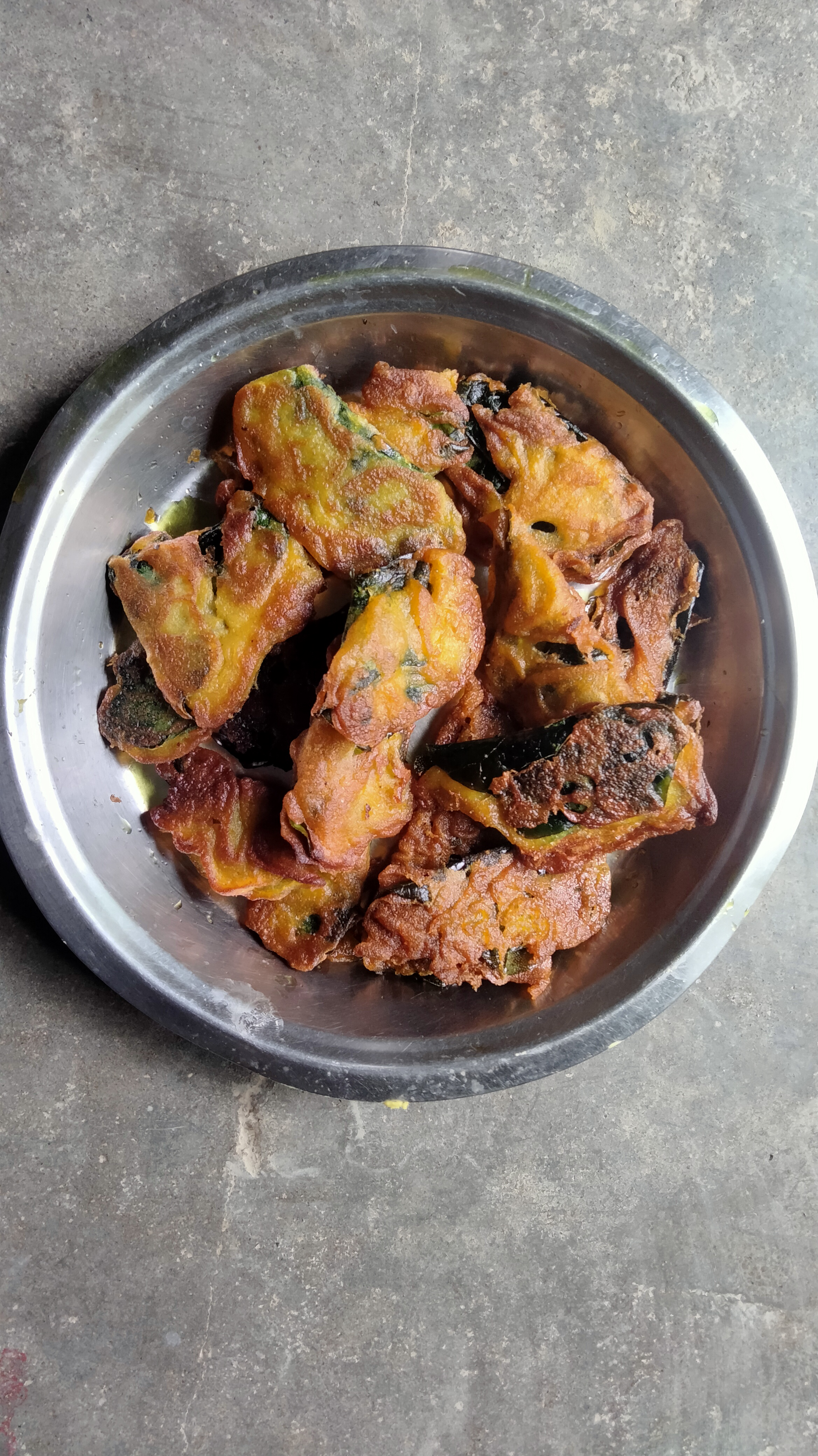
Tilkor Tarua in the Mithila region.

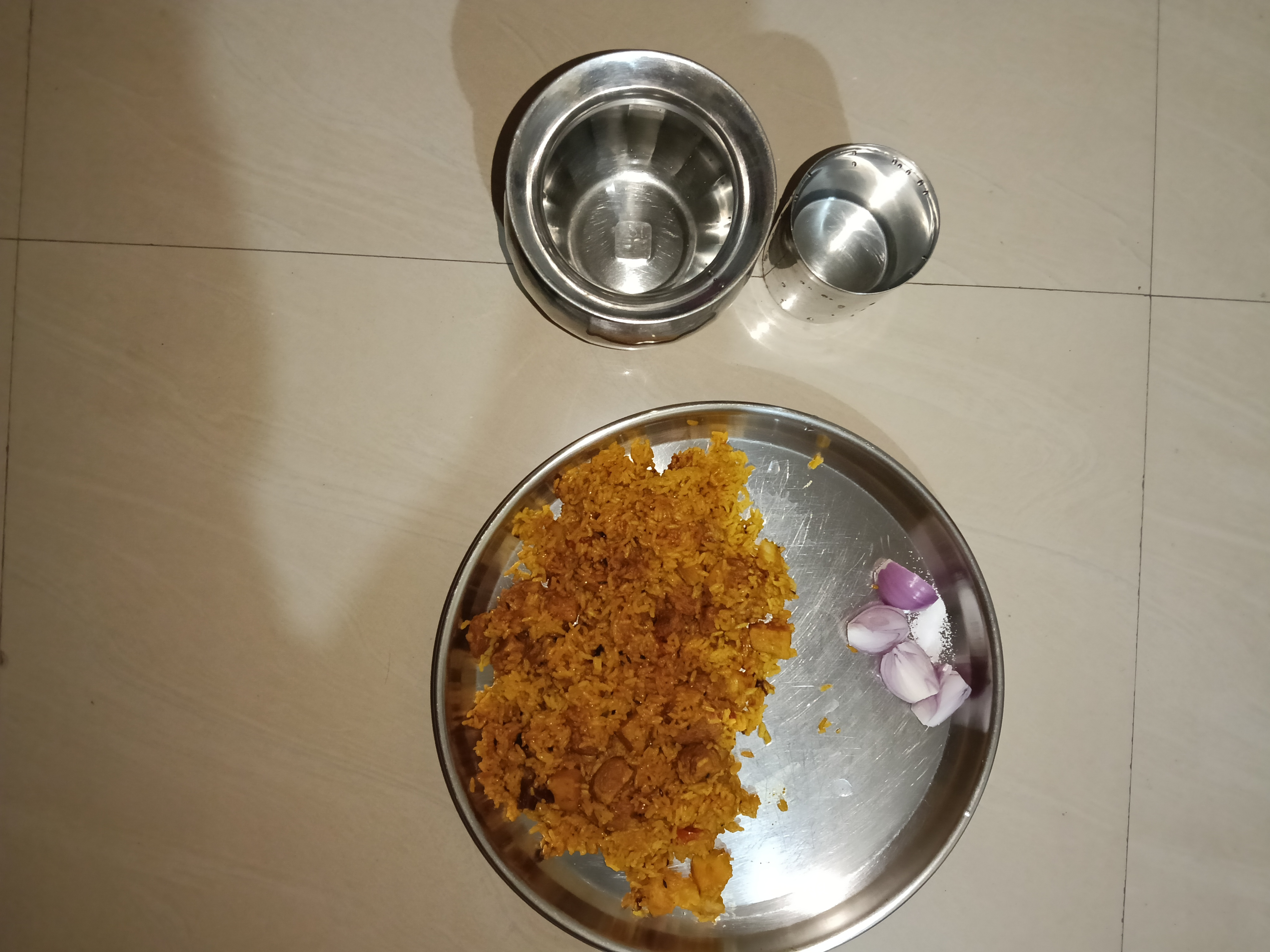
Maithil mixed veg rice food, similar to Biryani.

The service style of the cuisine has little similarity with that of the French table d'hôte; all preparations are served together on a platter and consumed at once. The staple food is bhat (boiled rice), dal, roti, tarkari and achar, prepared from rice, lentils, wheat flour, vegetables, and pickles. The traditional cooking medium is mustard oil. Panchforan is a common blend of five spices: jeer, ajwain, mangrail, sounf and methi, and is akin to the panchforan of Bengal.

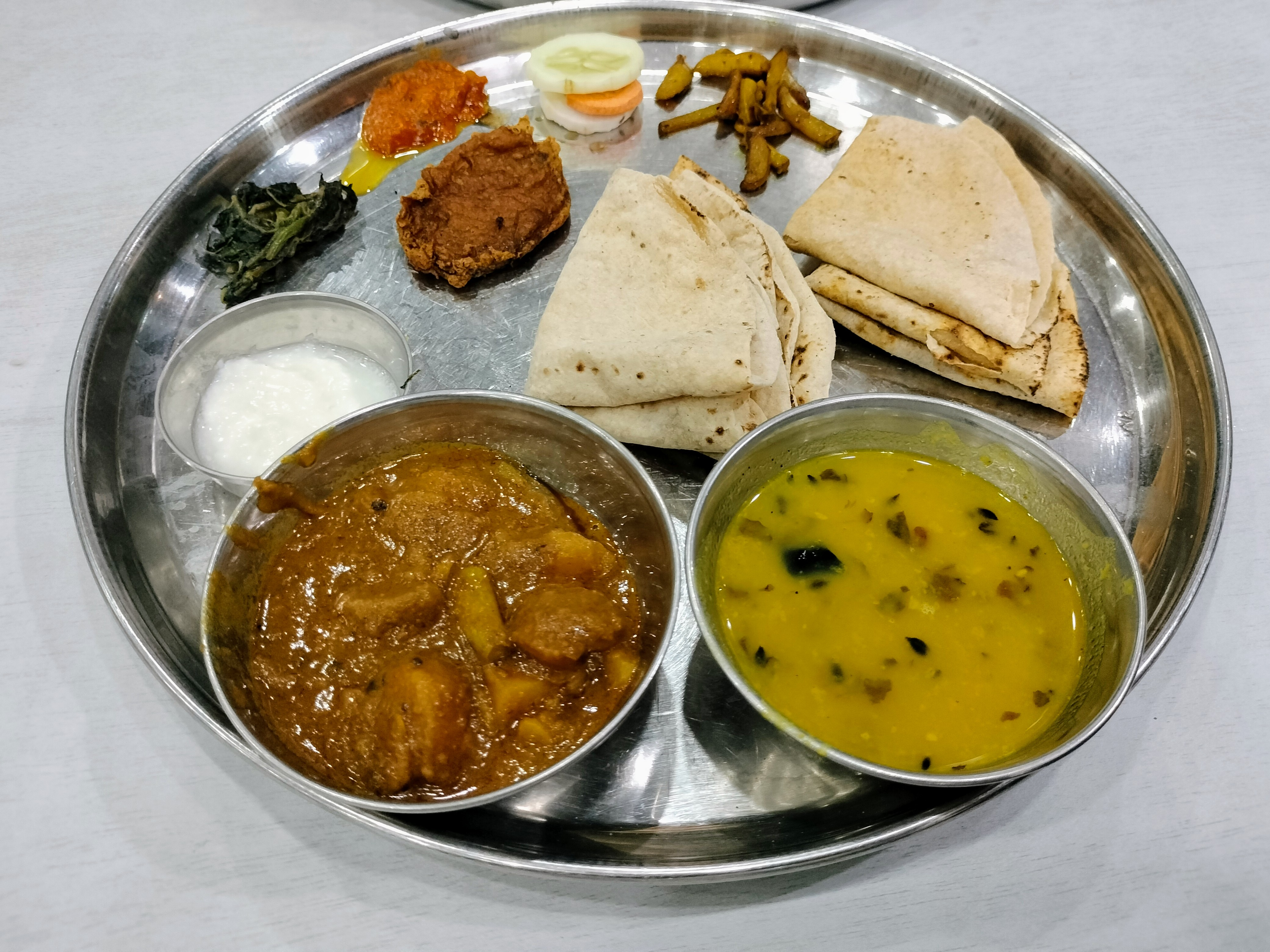
A typical Maithil Thali of Roti-Sabji.

== Types of meat ==
Mutton and fish are the traditional non-vegetarian items. Chicken is also consumed, but it is seen as an inferior option. Mutton and fish have religious and cultural significance in the Mithila region as sacrificial offerings to goddess Durga and Kali. The Maithil Brahmin community of Mithila is one of the few non-vegetarian Brahmin communities in India, which otherwise is seen as a strictly vegetarian caste within Hinduism.

== Vegetarian ==
Vegetarian food like saagak jhor (leafy vegetables with very thin gravy), as well as vegetables such as bitter gourd, ladyfinger, are eaten. Due to the large amount of root vegetables grown such as potato, yam, and khamarua, they are used in a number of preparations such as sanna (mashed vegetables, particularly root vegetables), bhajia (fried vegetables in mustard oil with salt, turmeric powder and green chillies or chilli powder), and tarua (marinated or coated deep-fried vegetables). Daail-jhimni consists of fried ribbed gourd cooked with lentil and cereals. Thadia saagak teeman is a simple meal with red spinach and lentils eaten with chapati or rice. Similar to a puree, teeman is made through the process of ghontod, manual churning. It can also be made with paneer or in a non-vegetarian style with shrimp added.

== Seafood ==
Machh-bhat is a fish curry served with steamed rice. Machhak jhor is a traditional fish curry used in many events with the exception of some religious festivals.

== Makhana ==
Mithila Makhana, a fox nut variety grown in the region's ponds, received a Geographical Indication (GI) tag, registered under the name of the Mithilanchal Makhana Utpadak Sangh. The registration defines Darbhanga, Muzaffarpur, Champaran, Begusarai, Madhubani, Katihar and other districts as its production area. It is widely used and distributed by the Maithil community during Kojagara Puja. A popular proverb names fish, betel leaf and fox nut (maachh, paan, makhaan) as the three defining foods of Mithila.

A delicious sweet and hot drink item called Sakrauri prepared from Mithila's Makhana, milk and dry fruits, etc. It is often served during Maithil Brahmin Bhoj in the region.

== Festival foods ==
Many festivals are associated with particular foods. On Satuani, the eve of Jur Sital (the Maithil New Year), women prepare a feast that includes kadhi-badi-bhaat and tarua. Once cooking is complete, the stove is cleaned, worshipped and left unused for the following day. Bari-bhaat, prepared the day before, is eaten cold with curd or raw mango chutney, a custom linked to cooling the body before the summer heat.[6] Tilkut, a sweet made of crushed sesame seeds and jaggery, is prepared along with dahi-chura and exchanged among relatives.

View of Maithil's food Dahi-Churaa-Laai-Tilba along with vegetables during the festival of Makar Sankranti.

== Sauces and curries ==
Dried mango strips are widely used to give tartness in various gravies. Some sauces and gravies include:

- Jhor — a thin mustard and coriander-based gravy with chilli
- Bari — fried soft dumplings made of besan, gram flour, cooked in spicy gravy
- Maus — generally mutton or chicken or quail (tittar or battair, a small game bird), or sometimes game in spicy gravy. Generally eaten with malpua, sohari (chapatti) puri, or steamed rice.
- Dokak jhor — commonly an oyster stew cooked with onion gravy
- Arikanchanak tarkari — a preparation of marinated sun-dried colocasia leaves, steamed and cooked in mustard gravy
- Goidila — a sauce prepared from green peas and flavouring, generally eaten with rice or rotis
- Kadhi bari — fried soft dumplings made of besan cooked in a spicy gravy of yogurt
- Sakrauri

== Breakfast ==
They would often start their day with a cup of steaming hot chai served with chura and ghugni ( black grams sautéed with onions, green chillies and other spices).

Poori – aloo dum, a potato dish, is a breakfast item common to have along with a sweet dish, jilebi (also known as jalewi, roundels of deep-fried fermented flour batter dipped in sugar syrup). Apart from that there are several other items that are common for breakfast including chini wala roti, pua, pachhua pu (flour pancake), and suzi ke halwa (semolina porridge), mith makhaan, makhan ke bhooja (salted makhan).

== Snacks and desserts ==
Some snacks include:

- Chure ka bhujia (beaten rice fried with sliced onion, chopped green chillies and green peas)
- Makai ke lawa (popped corn)
- Masalgar murhi (rice pops mixed with chopped green chillies, onion, coriander leaf, salt and a few drops of mustard oil)
- Jhilli (jalebi-like salted batter made of besan flour)
- Samosas (singhara)
- Launglati (langlatti)
- Kachari
- Pyaaji

Parwal Mithai prepared by Maithil woman in Navi Mumbai.

Sweet foods are also popular. Varieties of kheer are a common dessert, including makhank kheer which is prepared with lotus seeds, milk and dried nuts. Malpua is popular and has a traditional Mithila preparation that differs from that of north India. Both are prepared from a flour batter; in north India after deep frying they are dipped in sugar syrup, while in Mithila the batter itself is sweetened and it is a dry preparation which can be stored for two to three days. There are also sweet preserves made out of fruit pulps such as ammath (layered mango pulp sun-dried and cut into small chunks), kumhar ke murabba, papita ke murabba, and dhatrikak murabba. Laddoo, khaja, chandrakala, rasgulla, and other desserts are common.

== Traditional dishes ==
Some traditional Maithil dishes are:

- Dahi-Chura
- Vegetable of Arikanch
- Kadhi bari
- Ghooghni
- Tarua
- Tilkor Tarua
- Bada
- Badee
- Maachh
- Mutton
- Irhar
- Purakiya
- Makhan Payas
- Anarasa
- Bagiya
- Sattuwa varal puri
- Bhuswa
- Khaja(especially Pipra,Supaul district)

== See also ==
- Indian cuisine
- Murabba
