= Alu Potala Rasa =

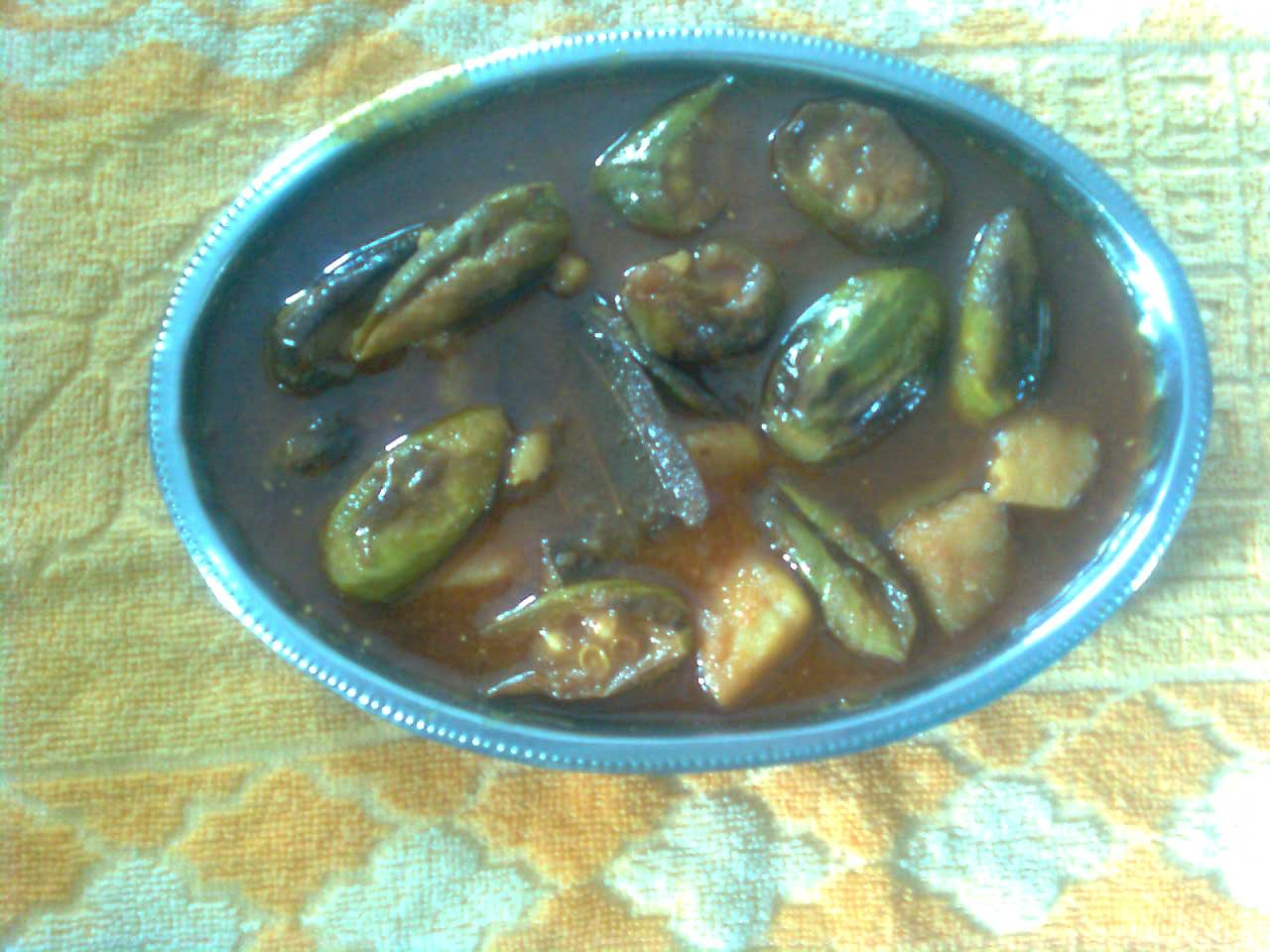
- Type: Curry
- Place of origin: India
- Region or state: Odisha
- Main ingredients: Potatoes, pointed gourd, ginger, garlic, onions, coconut, cumin, chilli powder, turmeric powder

Alu Potala Rasa is a spicy gravy-based curry that originates from Odisha, India. It is made with potala (pointed gourd) and aloo (potatoes).

== Etymology ==
The name Alu Potala Rasa is derived from three Odia words:

Alu (ଆଳୁ): Potato Potala (ପୋଟଳ): Pointed gourd Rasa (ରସା): Gravy or sauce

Thus, the name literally translates to “potato and pointed gourd in curry.”

== Ingredients ==
The core ingredients of Alu Potala Rasa are:

- Pointed gourd (Trichosanthes dioica)
- Potatoes (Solanum tuberosum)
- Onions, tomatoes, ginger-garlic paste, and green chilies
- Traditional Indian spices: turmeric, coriander, cumin, red chili powder, and garam masala
- A tempering of panch phoran (a five-spice blend), which is typical in Odia and Bengali cuisines
- Mustard oil, preferred for its pungency and traditional use in eastern Indian cooking

== Preparation ==
The preparation of Alu Potala Rasa involves the following key steps:

- Vegetable Preparation: The pointed gourds are peeled and sliced, while the potatoes are cubed. Both are lightly fried in mustard oil to enhance flavor and texture.
- Masala Base: Onions are sautéed until golden brown, followed by the addition of ginger-garlic paste, tomatoes, and ground spices to form a rich, aromatic masala.
- Cooking: The fried vegetables are added to the masala base and cooked in water to create a moderately thick gravy. The dish is simmered until the vegetables are tender and the flavors are well blended.
- Final Touch: A pinch of garam masala is added before serving. Fresh coriander leaves are used as garnish.

== See also ==
- Oriya cuisine
