= Parwal Mithai =

Indian Parwal sweets

- View of Parwal Mithai prepared by Maithil woman.
- Type: Sweets
- Course: Dessert
- Place of origin: India
- Region or state: Bihar, Uttar Pradesh and West Bengal
- Associated cuisine: Maithil cuisine, Bihari cuisine, North Indian cuisine and West Bengal cuisine
- Serving temperature: Chilled
- Main ingredients: Parwal, mawa, sugar, milk or milk powder, pista, badam
- Ingredients generally used: Ilaichi powder, kesar and soda bicarbonates

Parwal Mithai is an Indian sweets prepared by using Parwal and other ingredients. The Parwal Mithai is filled with dairy products and small pieces of dry fruits. It is popular in Bihar, Uttar Pradesh and West Bengal, etc. The major ingredients used to prepare the Parwal Mithai are Parwal, mawa, sugar, milk or milk powder, pista, badam, ilaichi powder, kesar, and soda bicarbonate, etc. It is prepared at home for households use and at sweets factory for commercial purposes. It is very popular during the seasons of Hindu festivals particularly Diwali festival in the Indian subcontinent. On occasions of the festivals, it is used for offering bhog to the God and the deities.

The green coloured sweets in the image are Parwal Mithai. It is kept for offering bhog to the Goddess Lakshmi during the Lakshmi Puja on the occasion of the Diwali festival in India.

== Etymology ==
The name of the sweet contains two Indic words Parwal and Mithai. The first word Parwal is Hindi name of trichosanthes dioica green vegetable in India. Similarly, the second word Mithai refers to Indian sweets. Thus the literal meaning of Parwal Mithai is sweets prepared from trichosanthes dioica green raw vegetable.

== Description ==
It is green coloured dish. The colour of the mithai gives it a beautiful look. The taste of the sweet is delicious to eat. It is categorised as a Tasty Sweet.

The Parwal Mithai could be preserved for a week by keeping it in a fridge. It is served chilled for eating.
