= Tilkor Tarua =

Tarua of Tilkor leaves in Mithila

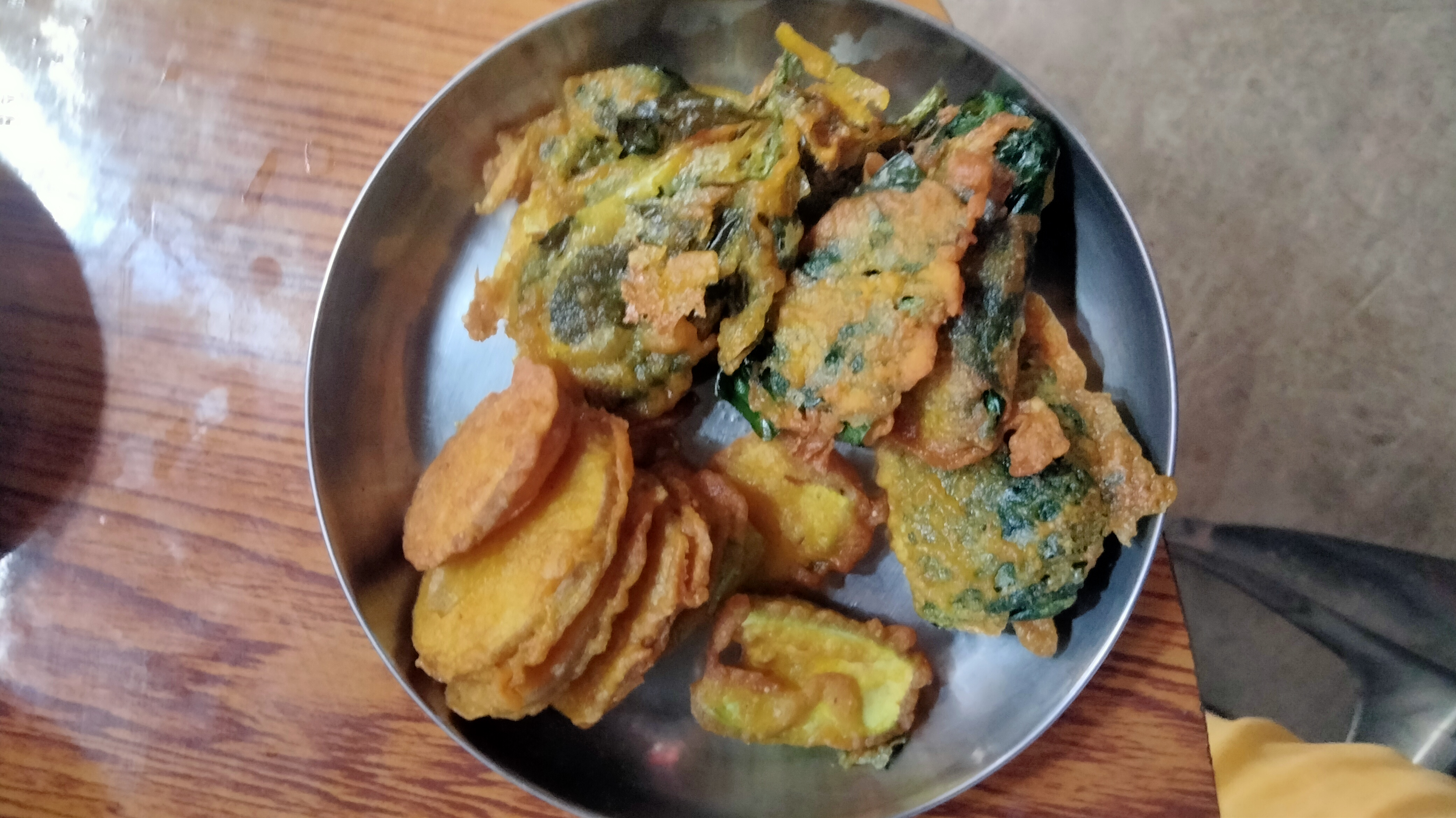
- The green fritters in the plate are Tilkor Tarua
- Alternative names: तिलकोर के तरुआ
- Type: Fritter
- Course: Main course
- Region or state: Mithila region
- Associated cuisine: Maithil cuisine
- Created by: Maithils Women

Tilkor Tarua (Maithili: तिलकोर के तरुआ) is a special dish popular in the Mithila region of the Indian subcontinent. It is one of the important items served with main course for guests at the home of Maithil people.

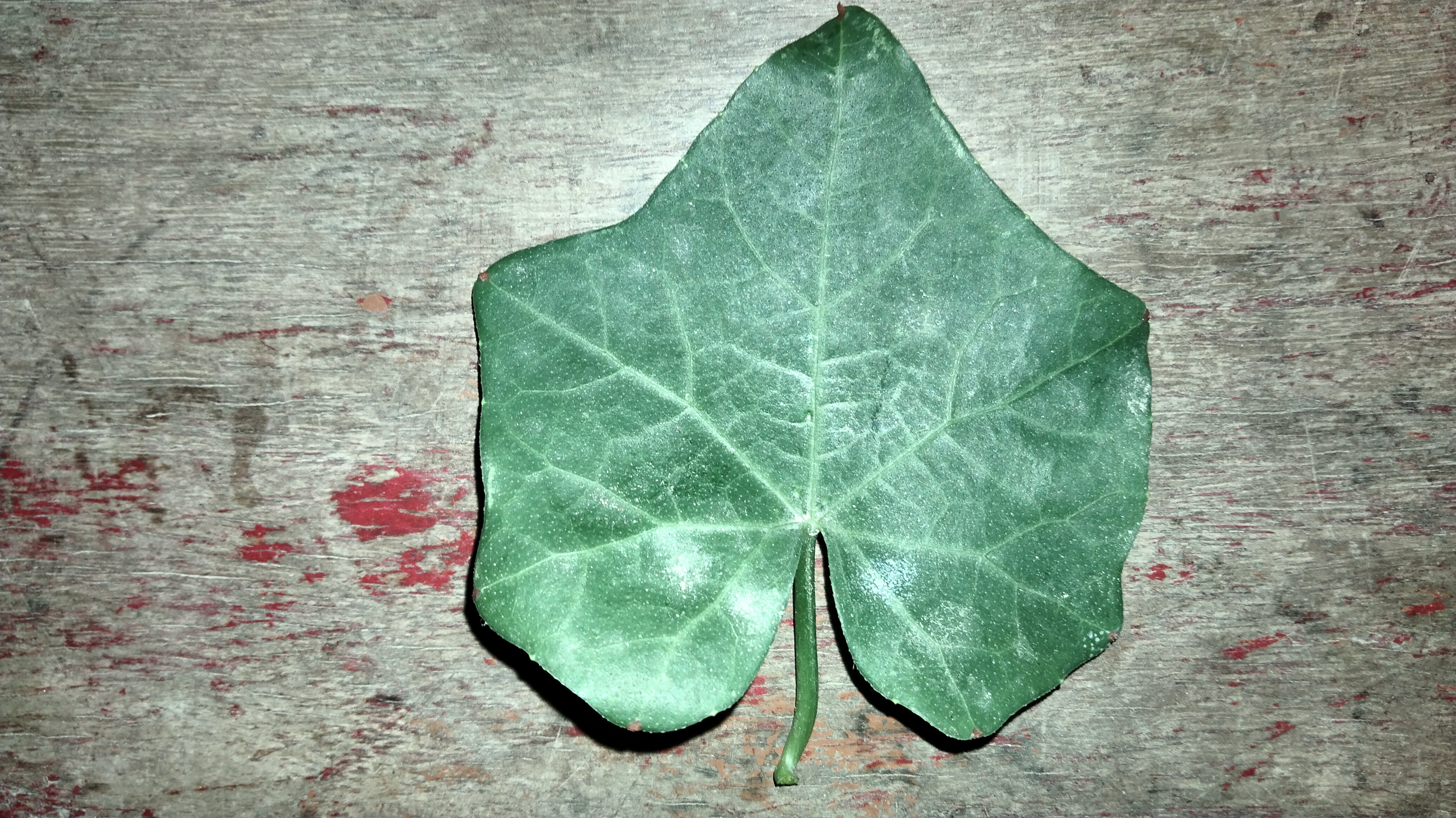
Tilkor leaf

== Etymology ==
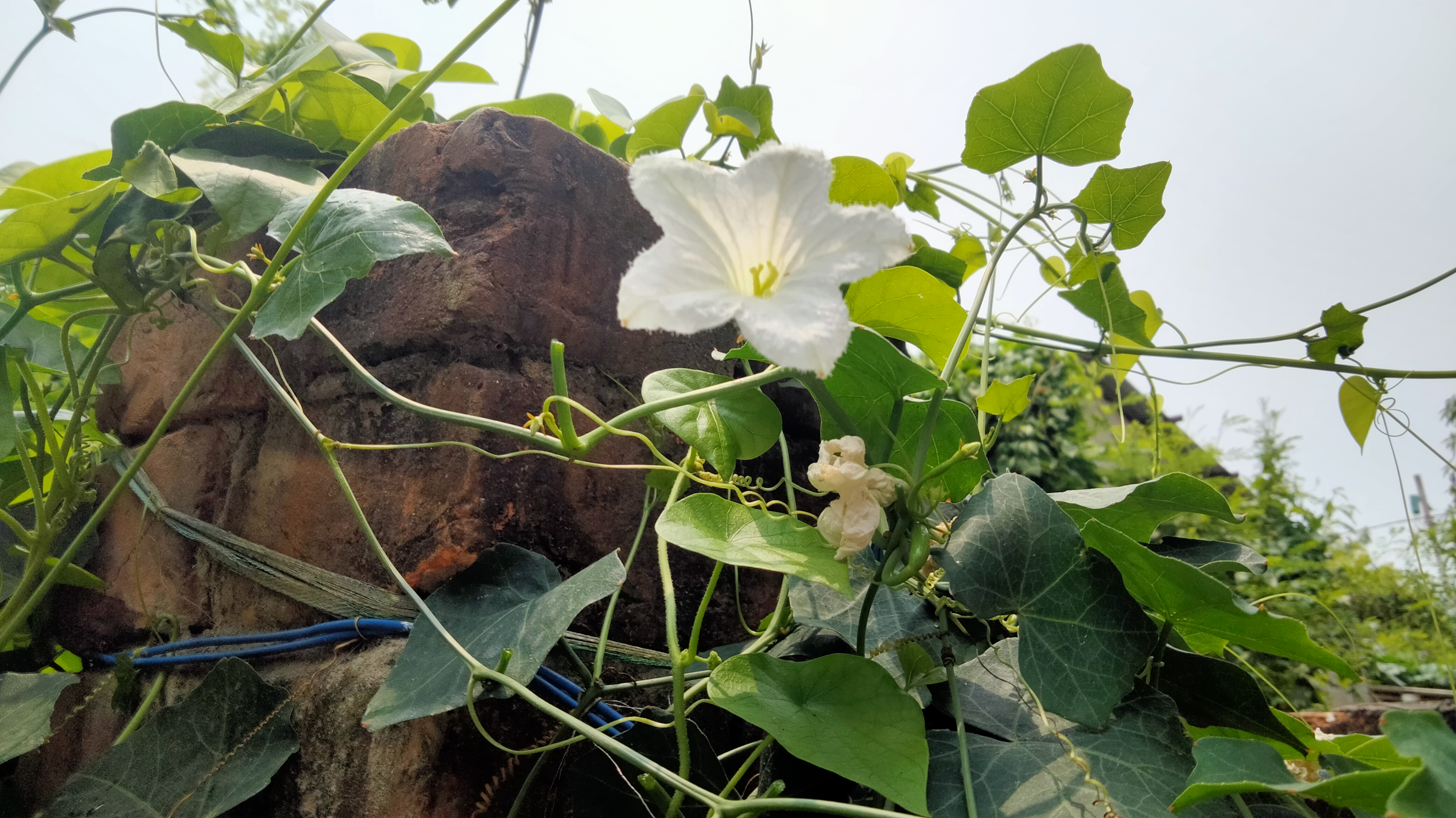
Naturally found Tilkor plants in the Mithila region

Tilkor Tarua is a Maithili word having two terms Tilkor and Tarua. Tilkor is the Maithili name of "Momordica monadelpha" or Coccinia grandis or ivy gourd or scarlet gourd plant. It is a creeper or climber plant found naturally in the Mithila region. In the Mithila region, Tilkor generally refers to the leaves of the plant. Tarua is the Maithili word for a dish made with leaves or thinly sliced vegetables coated in rice batter and deep-fried in mustard oil.

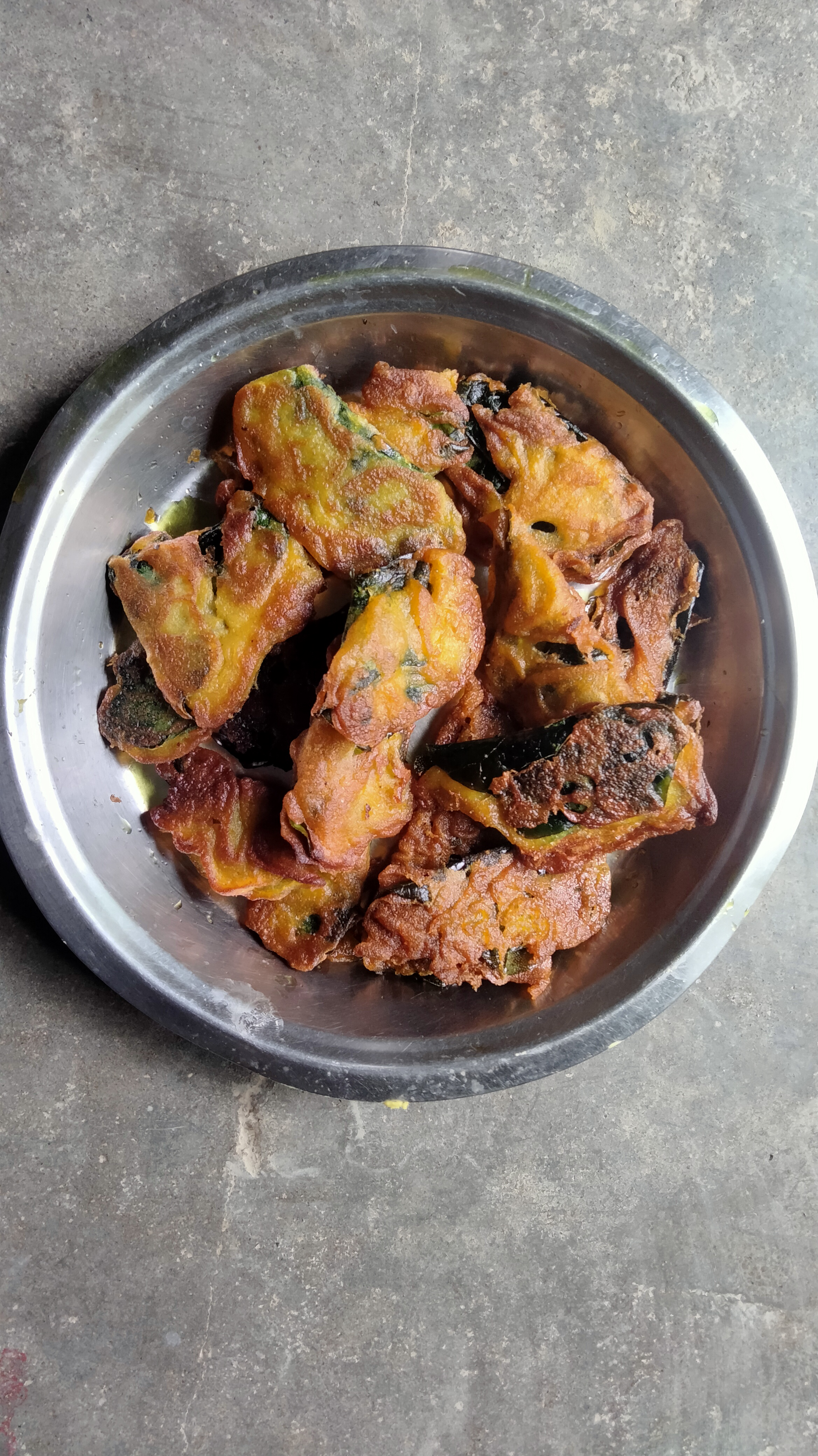
Tilkor Tarua

== Description ==
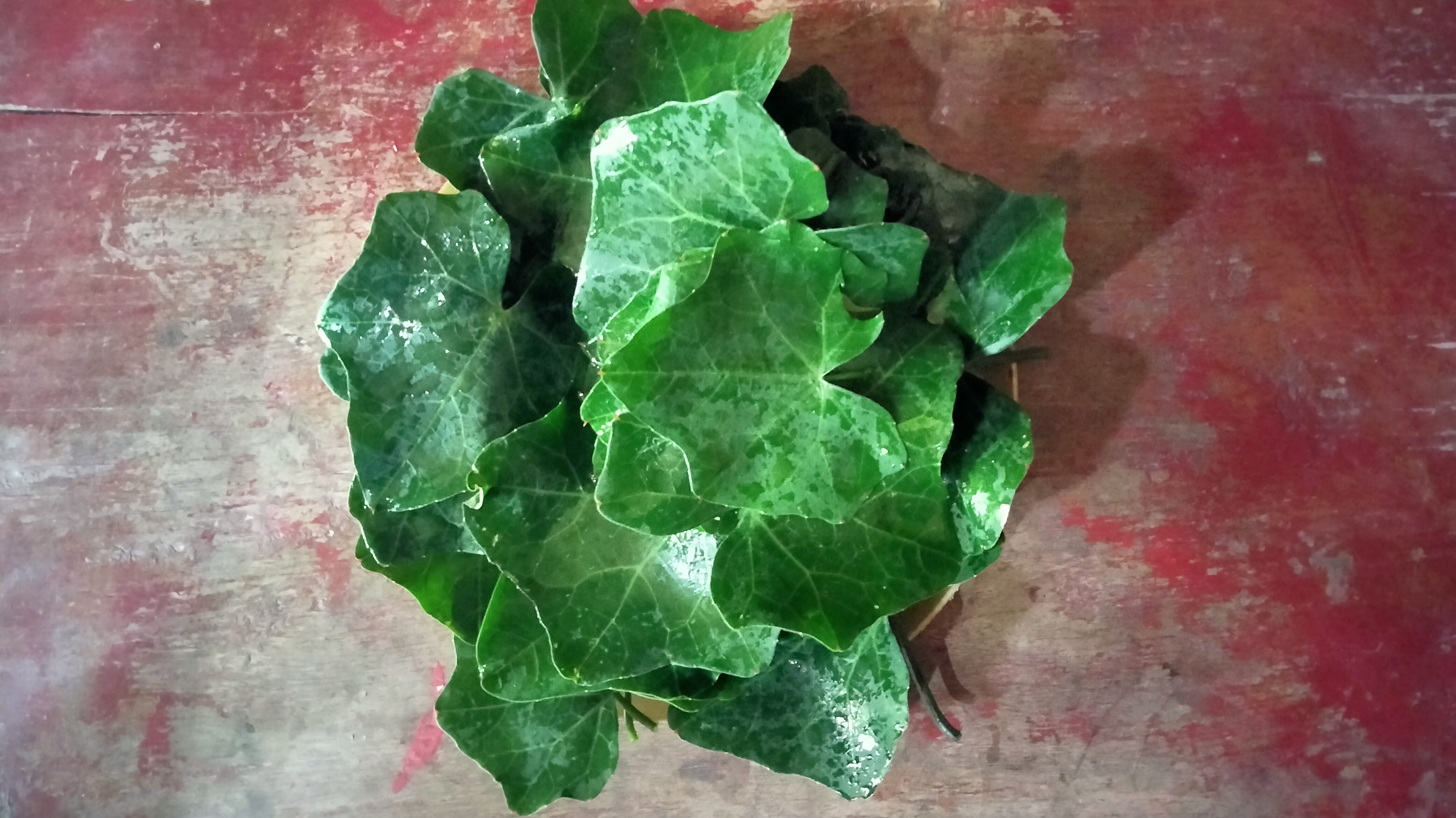
Tilkor leaves for making Tarua

The main ingredient of the Tilkor Tarua is the leaves of Tilkor creepers or climbers found naturally in the Mithila region. First of all, some rice wet paste is prepared which is locally known as pithaar. Then the paste is mixed with some spices, salt, and turmeric. After that, the Tilkor leaves are dipped into the paste and then finally fried in mustard oil. Tilkor Tarua are very crunchy. In the market areas of the Mithila region, Tilkor Tarua is served along with murhi as fast food and breakfast.

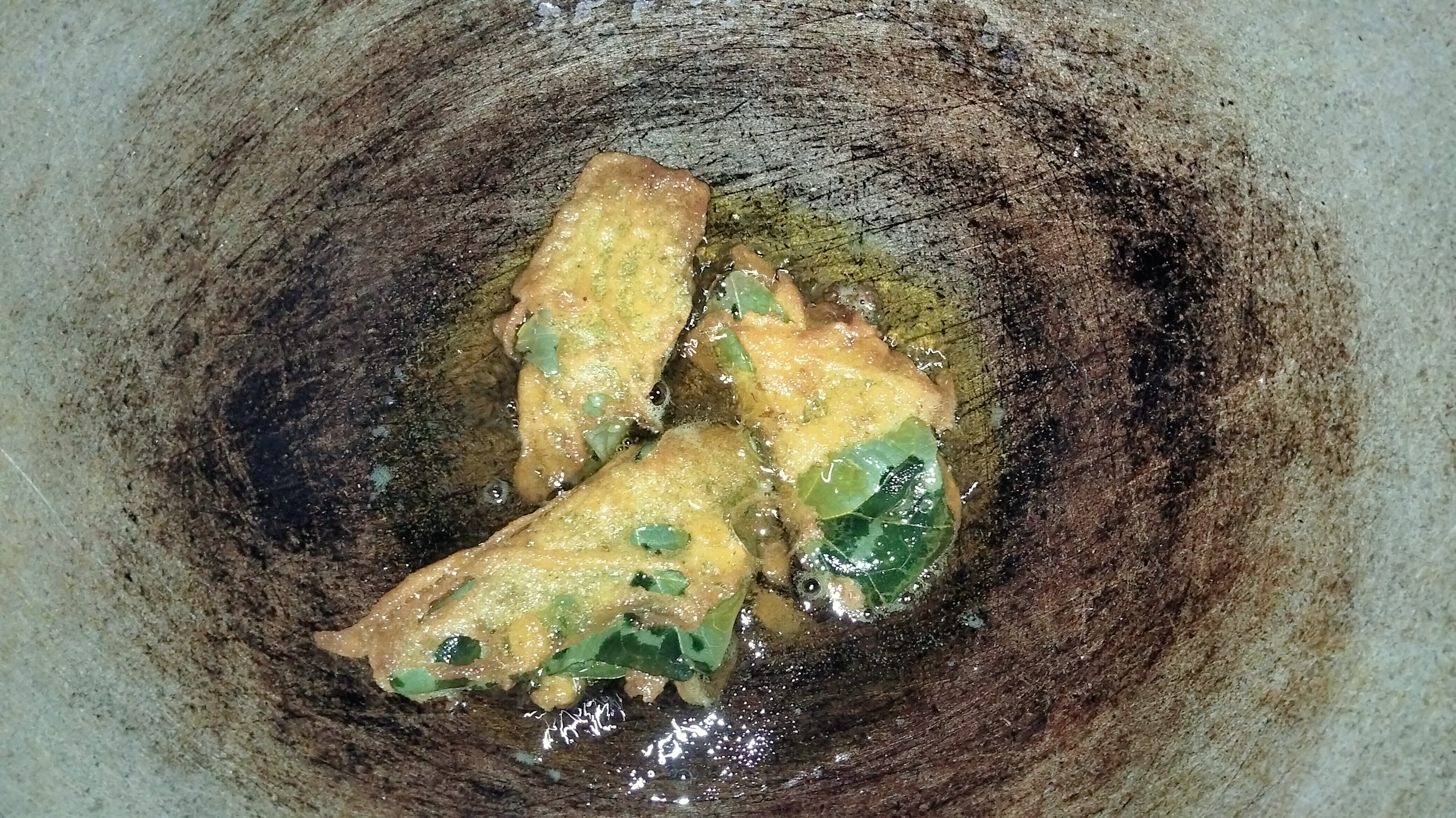
Frying Tilkor Tarua in mustard oil

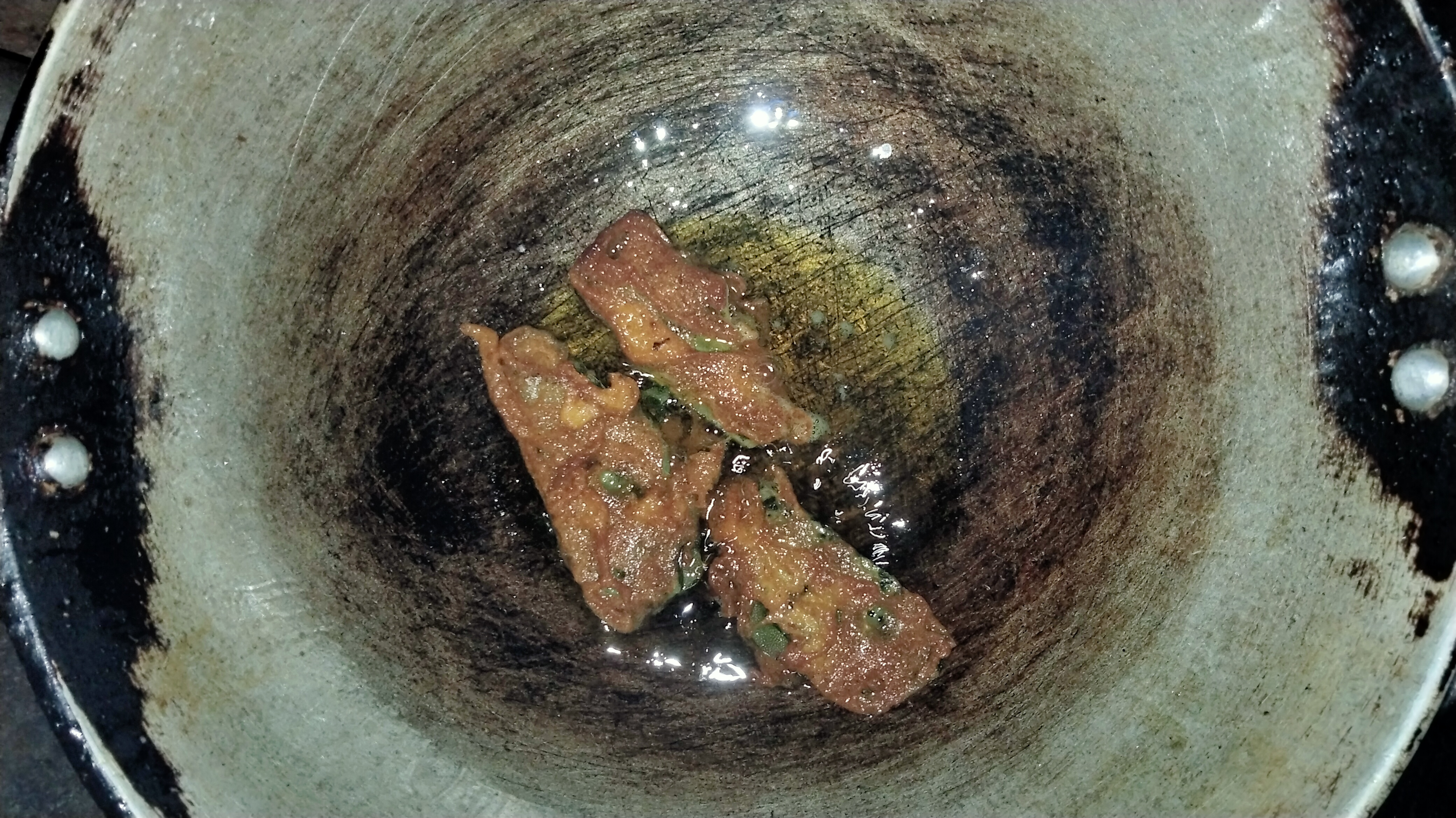
Fried Tilkor Tarua till the paste wrapped on Tilkor leaves become brown.

== Cultural significance ==
Tilkor Tarua has an important place in the culture of hospitality for guests by the Maithil people. In the Mithila region, the son-in-law has special importance, and he is served specially by his parents-in-law. Tilkor Tarua is one of the special items served in the meals to him to show respectful hospitality. Similarly, it is served when a Brahmin is invited for a sacred Brahman Bhojan. During festivals and auspicious occasions, the people of Mithila have an old tradition of decorating their plate with Tarua made of Tilkor.

At Vivah Panchami, celebrated every year at Janakpurdham, the processions of Lord Rama (Ram Baraat) coming from Ayodhya to Janakpur are also served the Tilkor Tarua in their food to show hospitality.
