= Tarua =

Food dish of the Indian subcontinent

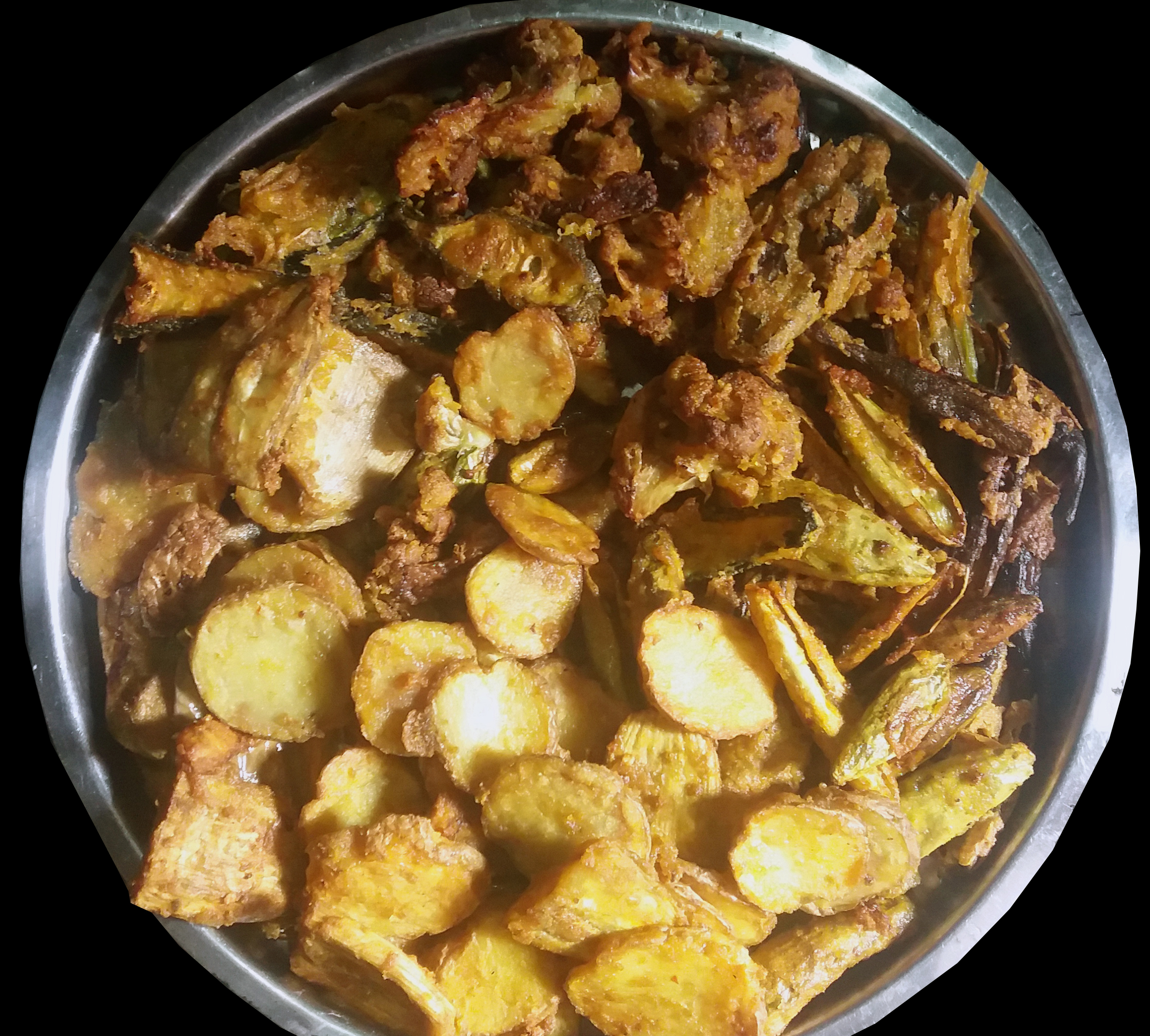
- Alternative names: Bajka, Bachka, Chakka
- Place of origin: India and Nepal
- Region or state: Bihar, Jharkhand, eastern Uttar Pradesh, Madhesh and eastern Lumbini
- Created by: People from Bhojpur, Mithila and Magadh regions
- Main ingredients: vegetables, gram flour, rice flour

Tarua (also called Bajka, Bachka or Chakka) is a dish of thinly sliced vegetables coated with rice batter and deep fried. It originates from the Mithila and Bhojpur regions of India and Nepal. The dish is especially prominent in the Indian states of Bihar, eastern Uttar Pradesh, and Jharkhand, as well as in Nepalese provinces of Madhesh and eastern Lumbini, where it is believed that it is impossible to welcome a guest without serving Tarua.

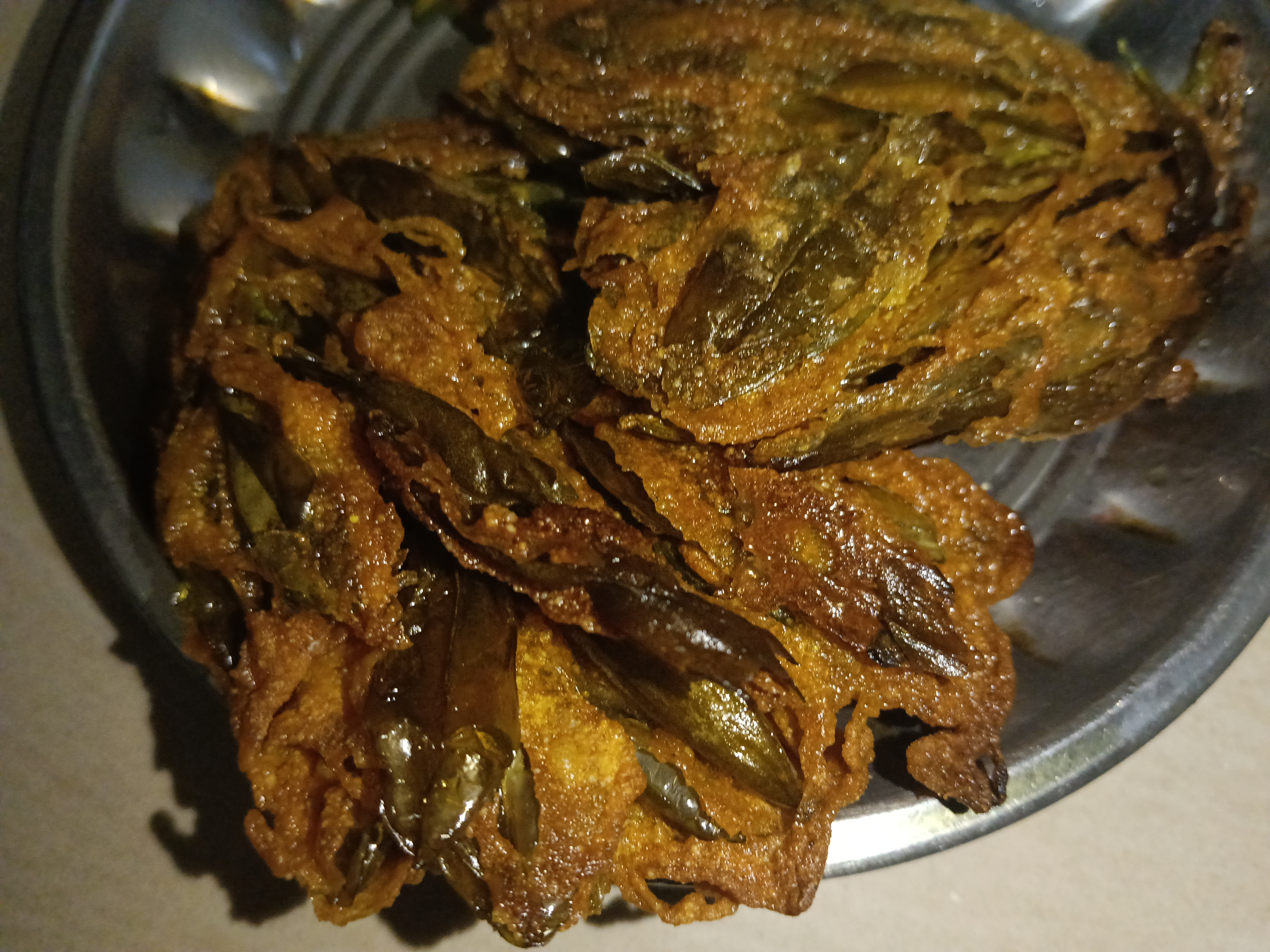
Tarua of Raja Rani Saag in Mithila

== Preparation ==
Tarua is made from cutting green vegetables and vegetable leaves into different shapes. They are dipped in a batter made from gram flour or rice flour with added black pepper, red chili powder and salt, which is later deep-fried in oil.

== Variations ==
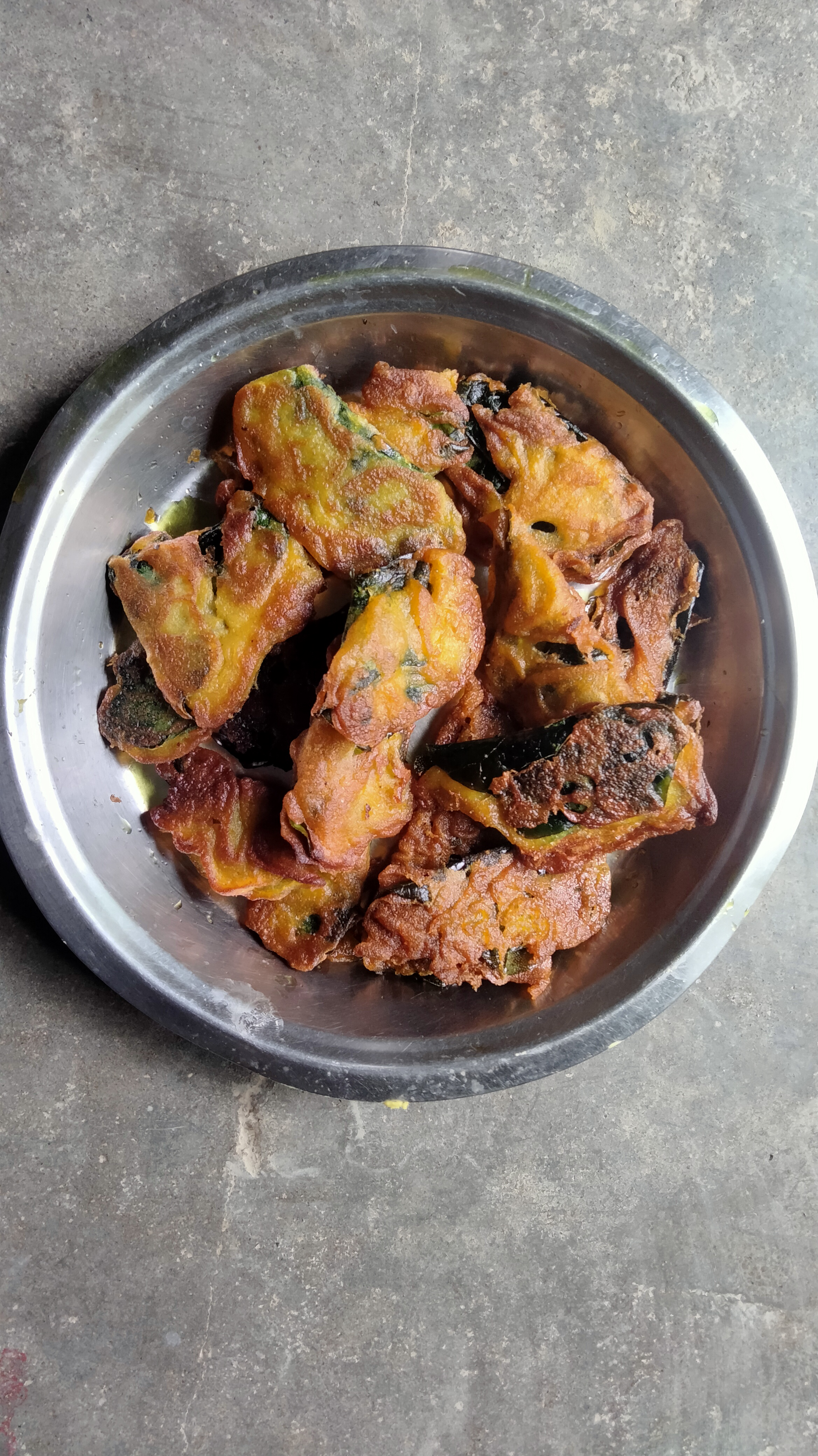
Tilkor Tarua

Tarua can be made from any green vegetable. The most popular varieties of Tarua include Tilkor tarua, made from Tilkor leaves, and Aloo tarua, made from potato. Other varieties of tarua include Bhindi tarua, made from okra, Kobi tarua, made from cauliflower, Baigan tarua, made from brinjal, Kadima/Kohda tarua, made from pumpkin, Lauka/Kaddu tarua, made from bottle gourd, Karaila tarua, made from bitter gourd, Ol tarua, made from elephant foot yam, Aurabi tarua, made from taro, Kumahar/Bhatua tarua, made from ash gourd, Khamharua tarua, made from Dioscorea satiea, Parora tarua, made from pointed gourd.

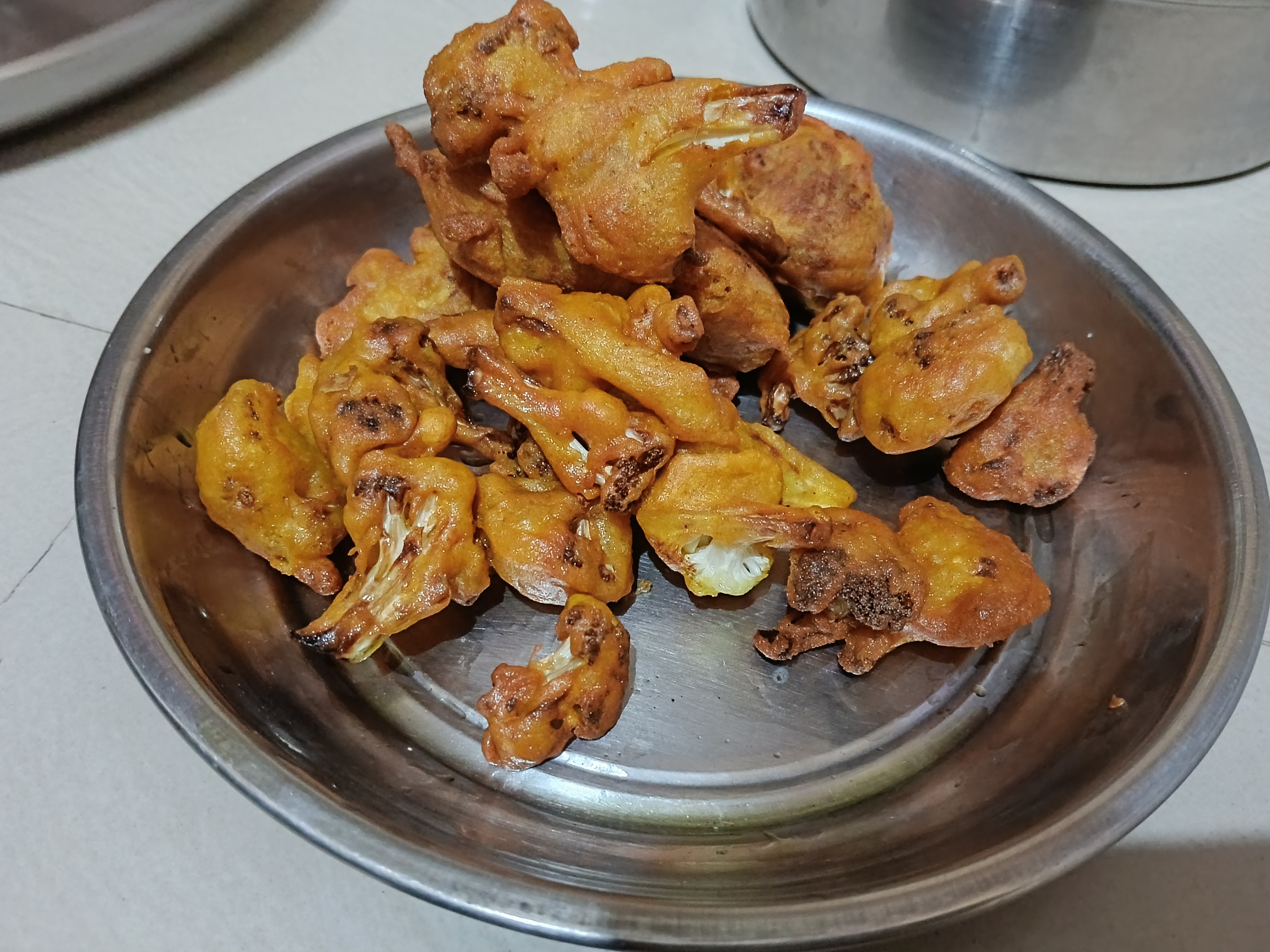
Kobi Tarua also known as Kobi Bachka

== See also ==
- Pakora
- Fritter
