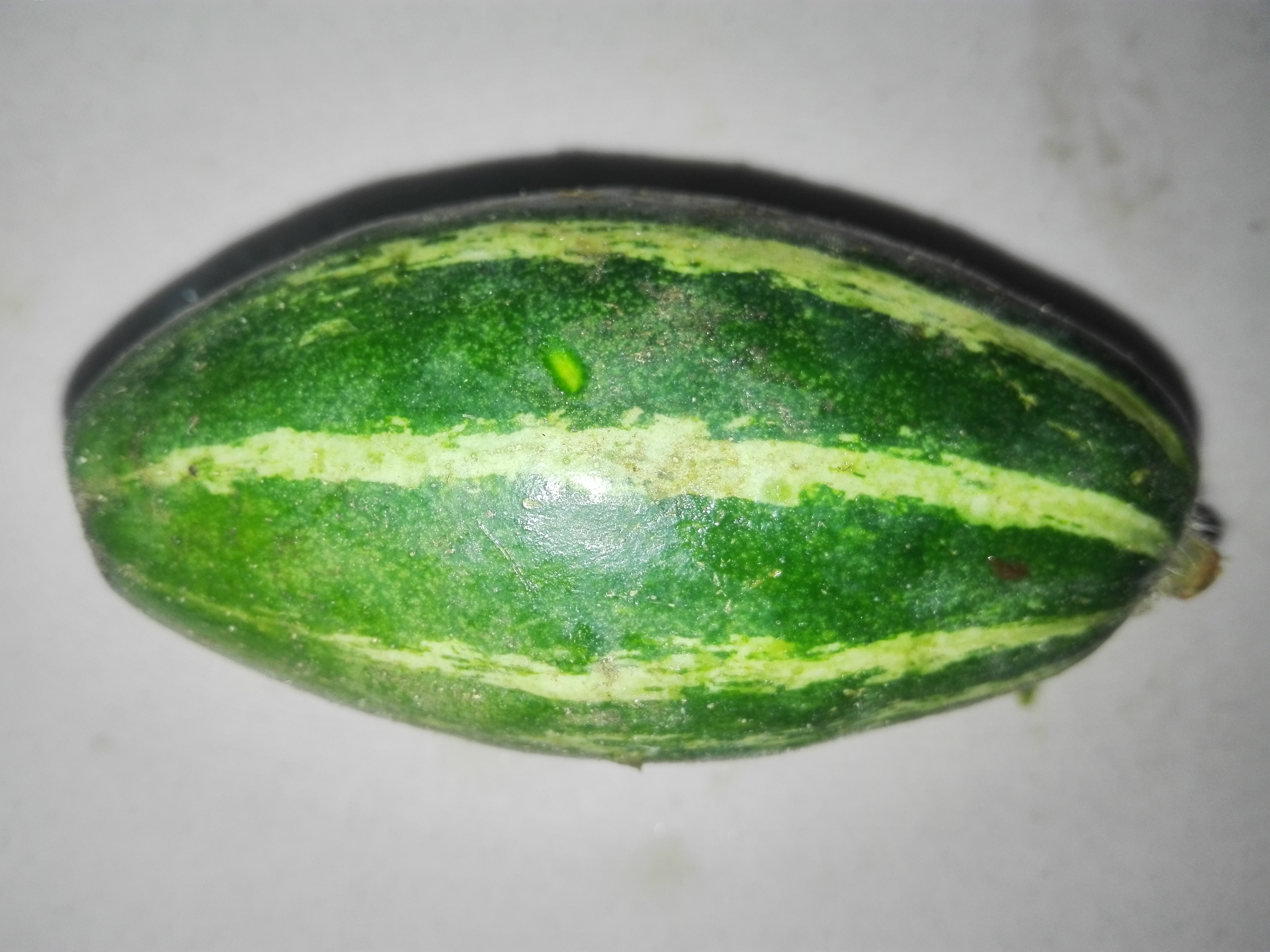
- Gourd
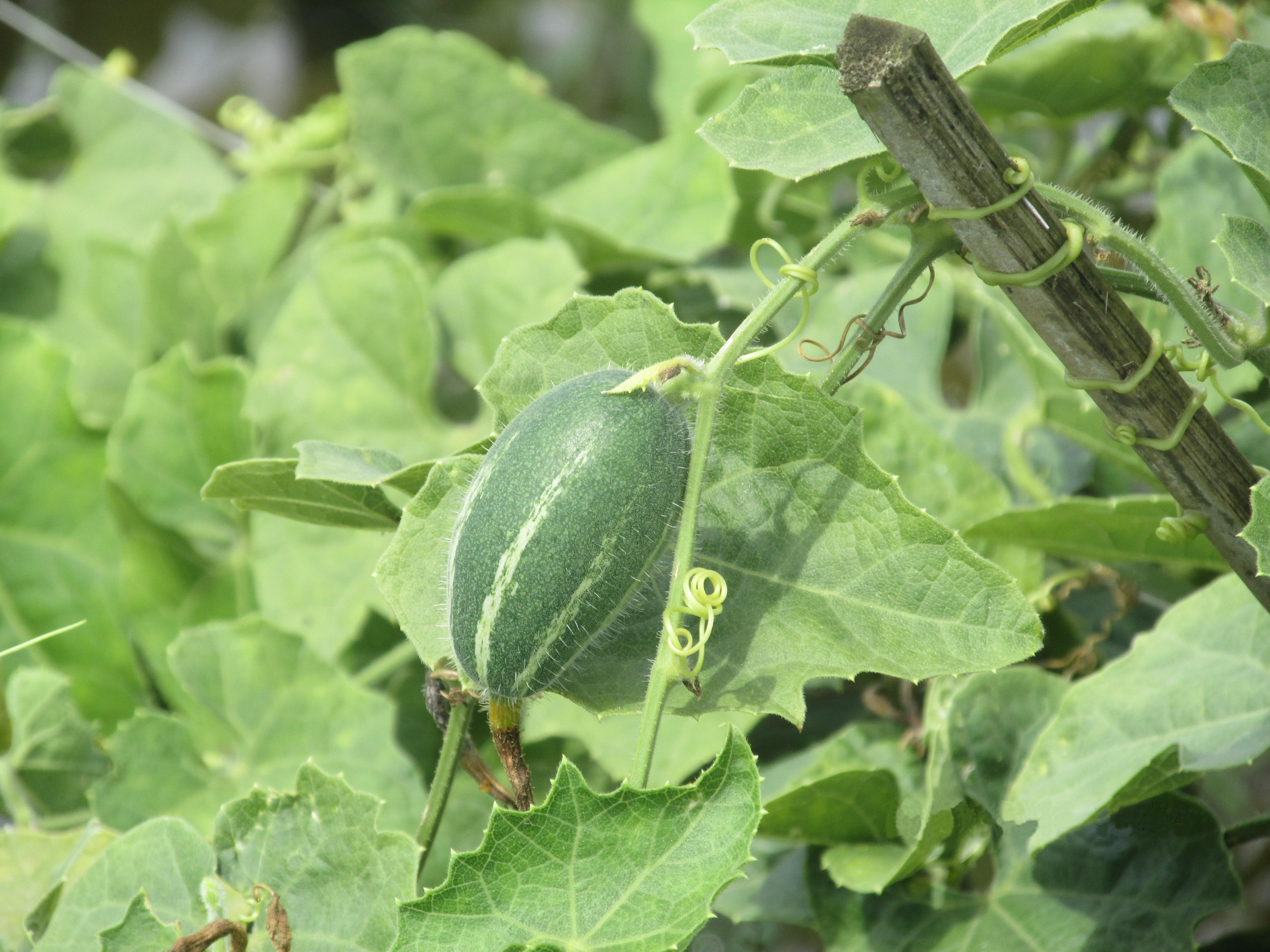
- Gourd plants

Scientific classification
- Kingdom: Plantae
- Clade: Tracheophytes
- Clade: Angiosperms
- Clade: Eudicots
- Clade: Rosids
- Order: Cucurbitales
- Family: Cucurbitaceae
- Genus: Trichosanthes
- Species: T. dioica

Binomial name
- Trichosanthes dioica Roxb.

Synonyms
- Anguina dioica (Roxb.) Kuntze

= Trichosanthes dioica =

Species of flowering plant

Trichosanthes dioica, also known as pointed gourd, is a tropical perennial cucurbit plant with its origin in the Indian subcontinent. The plant propagated vegetatively and grows with training on a support system (e.g., trellis) as pencil-thick vines (creepers) with dark-green cordate (heart-shaped) simple leaves. It is a well-developed dioecious plant having distinct male and female flowers on staminate and pistillate plants, respectively. The fruits are green with white or no stripes' and have unpalatable seeds. Size can vary from small and round to thick and long 5–15 centimetres (2–6 inches). It thrives well under a hot to moderately warm and humid climate. The plant remains dormant during the winter season and prefers fertile, well-drained sandy loam soil due to its susceptibility to water-logging.

== India ==
It is widely cultivated in the eastern and some northern parts of India, particularly in Northeastern Andhra, Odisha, Bengal, Assam, Bihar, and Uttar Pradesh. It is used as an ingredient for soups, stews, curries, sweets, or eaten fried and as potoler dorma or dolma with fish, roe or meat stuffing. It is called parwal in Hindustani (Hindi-Urdu) (परवल / پرول).

View of Parwal Mithai, a delicious sweet in the Indian subcontinent prepared by a Maithil woman in Navi Mumbai.

== Bangladesh ==
Pointed gourd is known in Bengali as patol (পটল). It is a vital summer vegetable in Bangladesh. It is cultivated and consumed in almost every district of the country. It is a perennial crop and sold at the end of October when there is a shortage of other alternative vegetables. The leaves of the plant also called Polta Pata are often consumed in Bengali cuisine.

== Nutrients ==
Most parts of T. dioica are used in local traditional medicine. The fruit constituents are minerals (magnesium, sodium, potassium, copper, and sulphur), vitamins, tannins, saponins, alkaloids, glycosides, flavonoids, steroids, pentacyclic triterpenes, and other bioactive compounds have proven that the pointed gourd promising.

Pointed gourd is a good source of vitamins and minerals. It is a good source of carbohydrates, vitamin A, and vitamin C. It also contains major nutrients and trace elements (magnesium, potassium, copper, sulfur, and chlorine) which are needed in small quantities, for playing essential roles in human physiology. 9.0 mg Mg, 2.6 mg Na, 83.0 mg K, 1.1 mg Cu and 17 mg S per 100 g edible part.

== In human culture ==
The fifteenth-century Hatha Yoga Pradipika 1.61–65 recommends Parwal as one of the foods suitable for yogins.

== Gallery ==
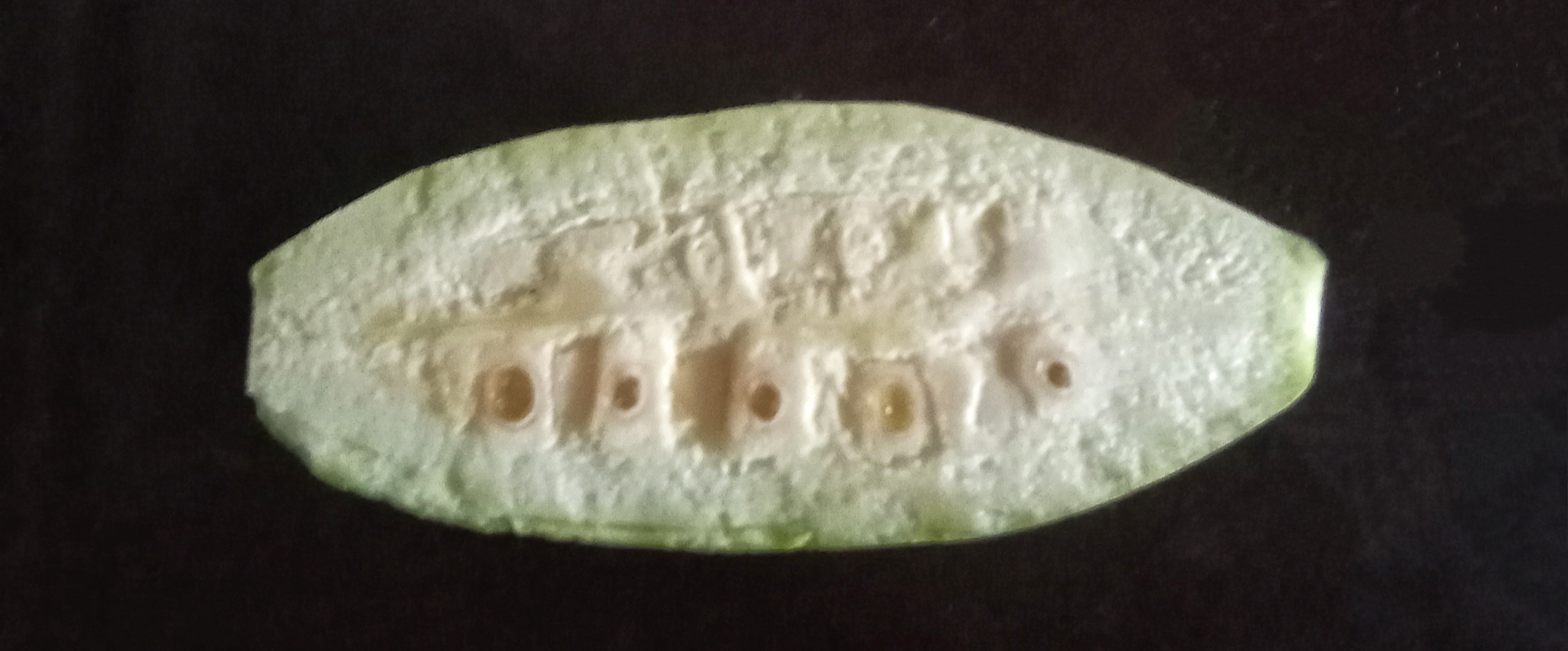
Longitudinal section of Pointed gourd (Trichosanthes dioica)

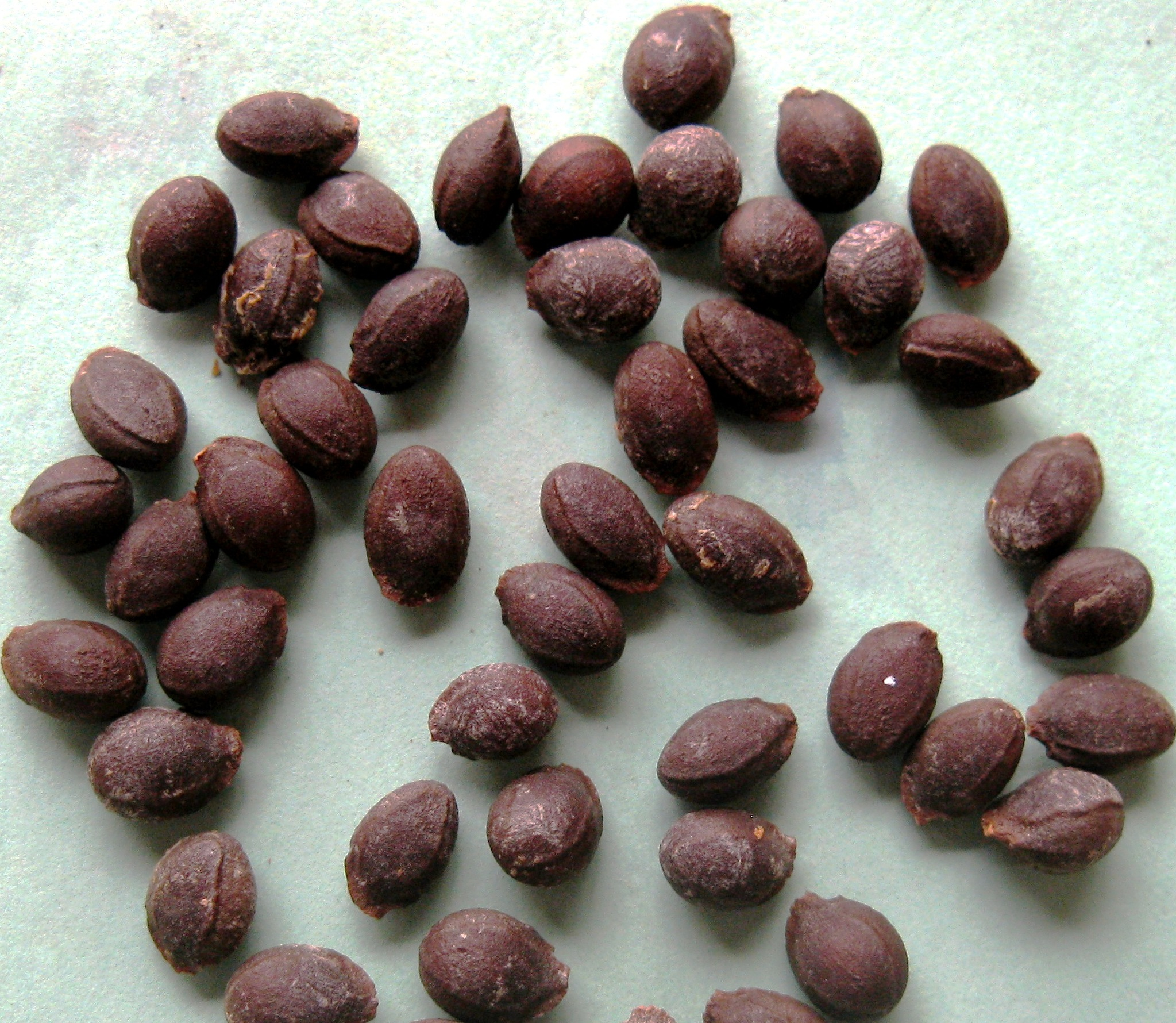
Pointed gourd (Trichosanthes dioica) matured seeds

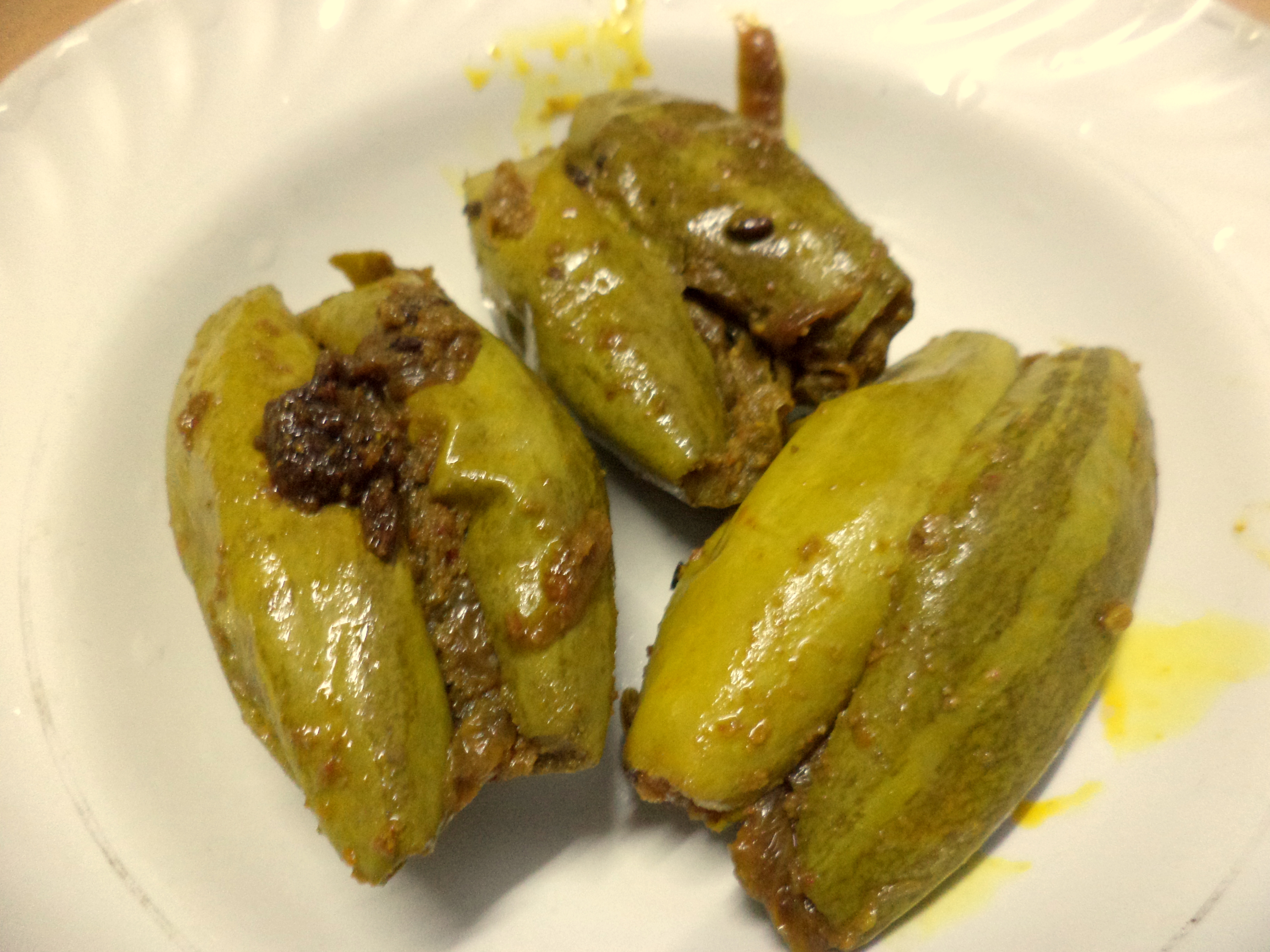
Cooked stuffed fruit

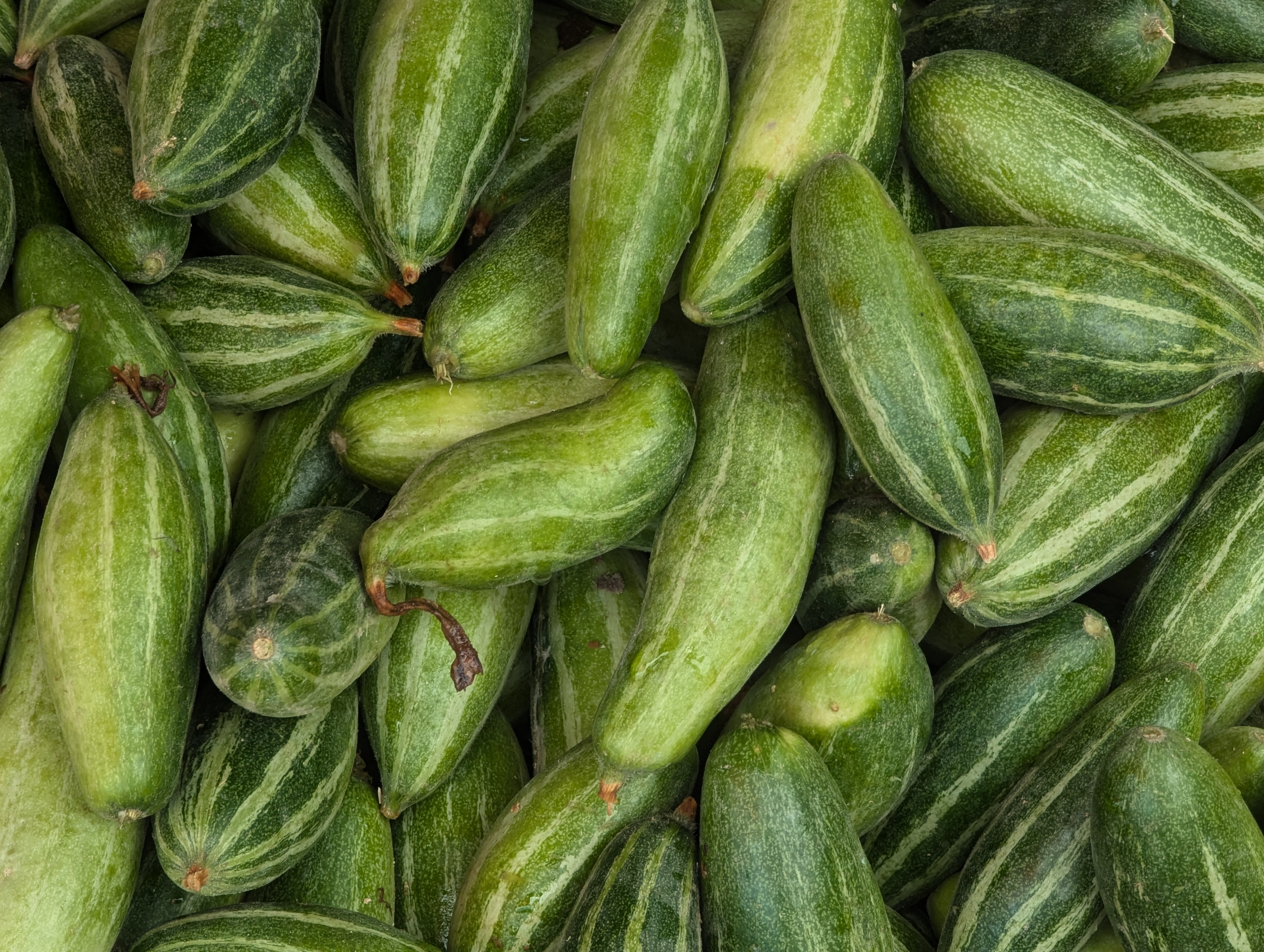
Pointed gourds (known as "potol") from Bangladesh

== See also ==
- Gourd
