= Jamaican cuisine =

Culinary traditions of Jamaica

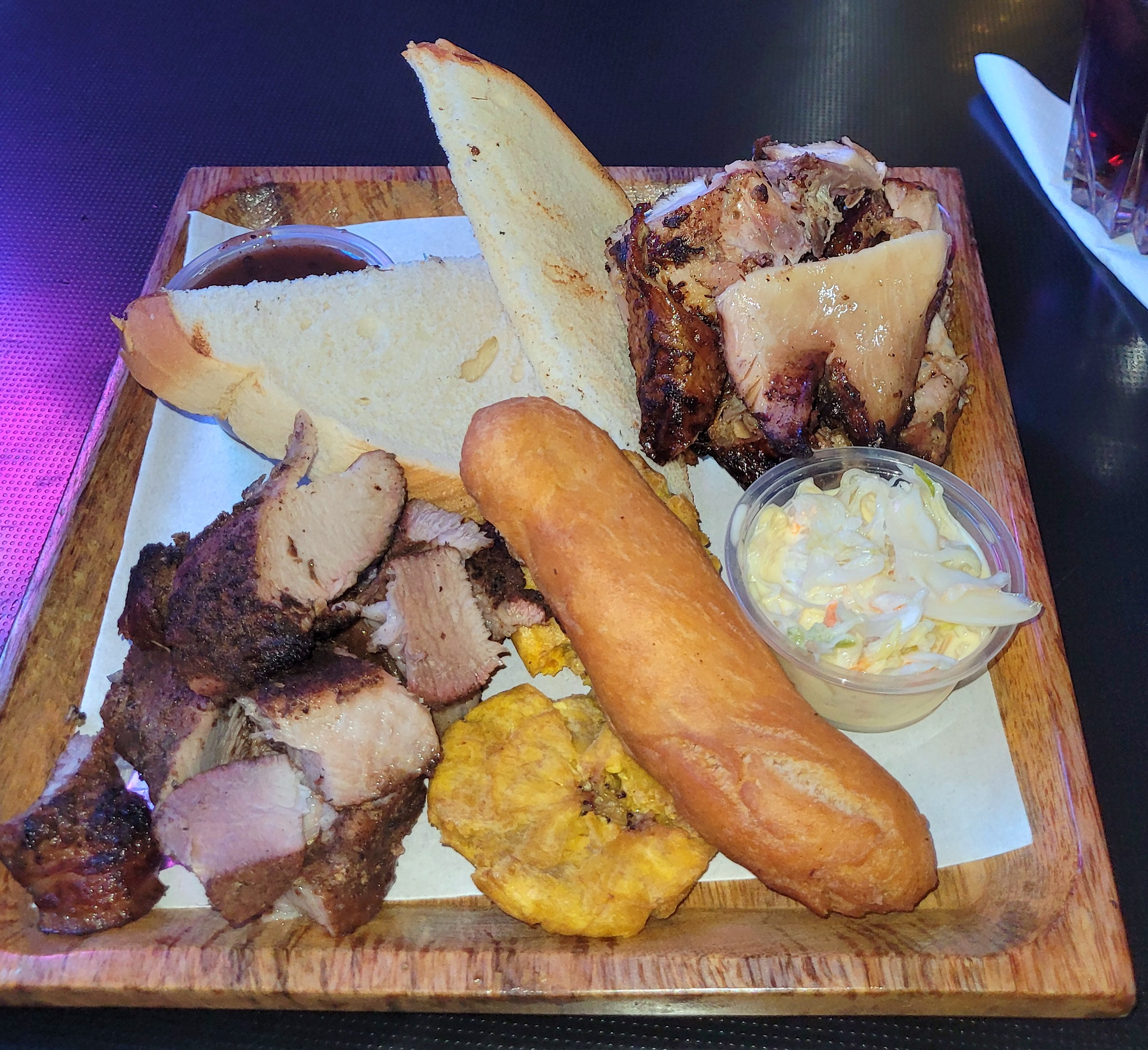
Jerk chicken and pork served with hard dough bread, jerk sauce, festival, fried pressed plantain and coleslaw, in Jamaica.

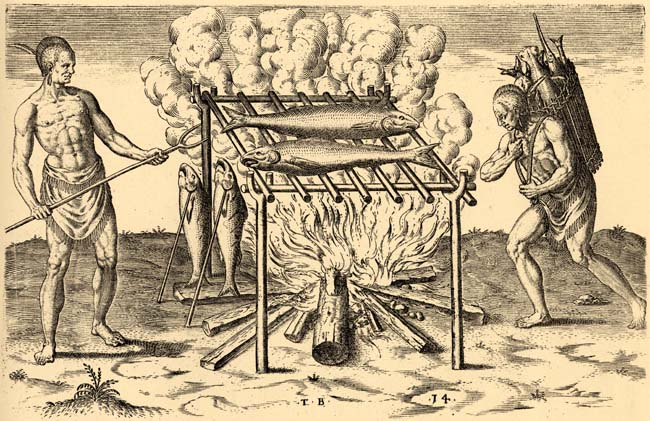
The Taínos jerked, smoked and roasted foods on a range of wooden grills.

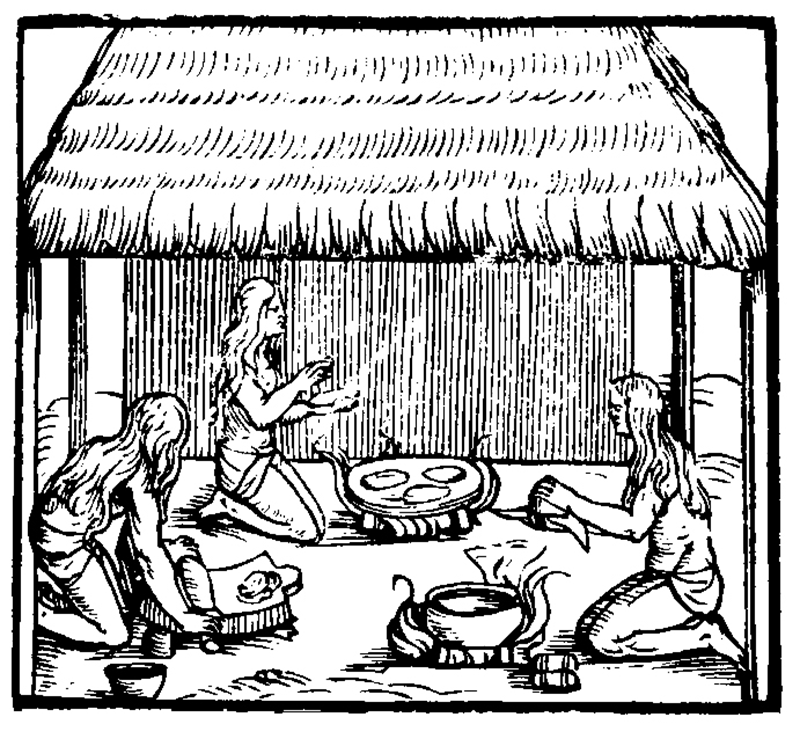
Taíno (Arawak) women preparing bammy in the 1500s.

Jamaican cuisine includes a mixture of cooking techniques, flavours and spices influenced by Amerindian, West African, Irish, English, Scottish, French, Portuguese, Spanish, Indian, Chinese and Middle Eastern people who have inhabited the island. It is also influenced by indigenous crops, as well as crops and livestock introduced to the island from Mesoamerica, Europe, tropical West Africa and Southeast Asia, which are now grown locally. A wide variety of seafood, tropical fruits and meats are available.

Some Jamaican dishes are variations of cuisines brought to the island from elsewhere, which are often modified to incorporate local produce and spices. Many others are novel or Creole dishes, created from a fusion of dishes, techniques and ingredients from different cultures, which have developed locally over time. Popular Jamaican dishes include curry goat, fried dumplings, brown stew (oxtail), ackee and saltfish and jerk. Jamaican patties along with various pastries, breads and beverages are also popular.

Jamaican cuisine has spread with migration, between the mid-17th and 20th centuries. Contingents of Jamaican merchants and labourers, who settled in coastal Latin America, to establish businesses, and work in agriculture and the construction of railroads, ports and the Panama Canal, contributed Jamaican dishes to the region. Also, Jamaicans who have sought economic opportunities in other parts of the world, have spread their culture and culinary practices.

== History ==
=== Development of the cuisine ===
==== Taíno and Arawak influences ====
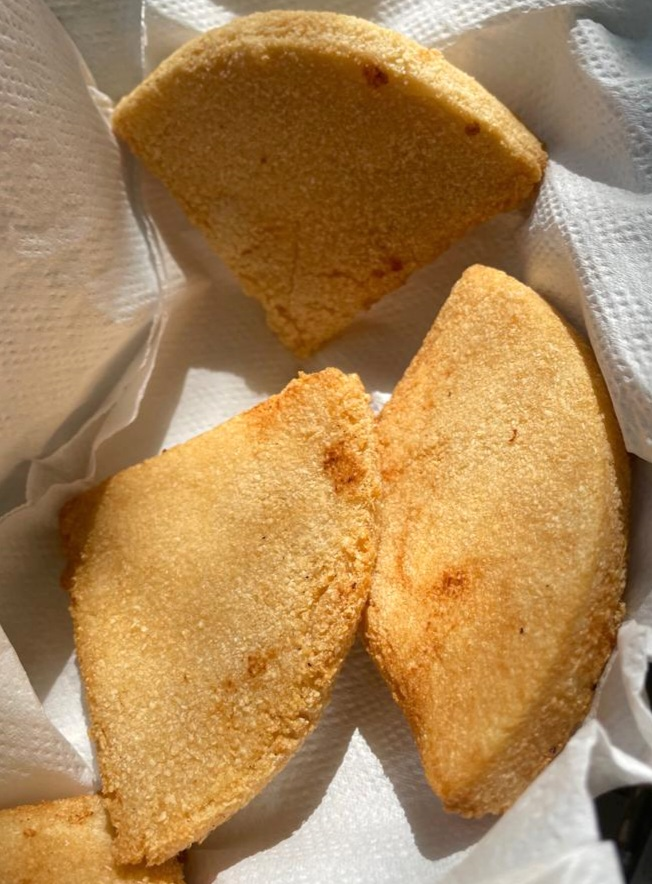
Bammy

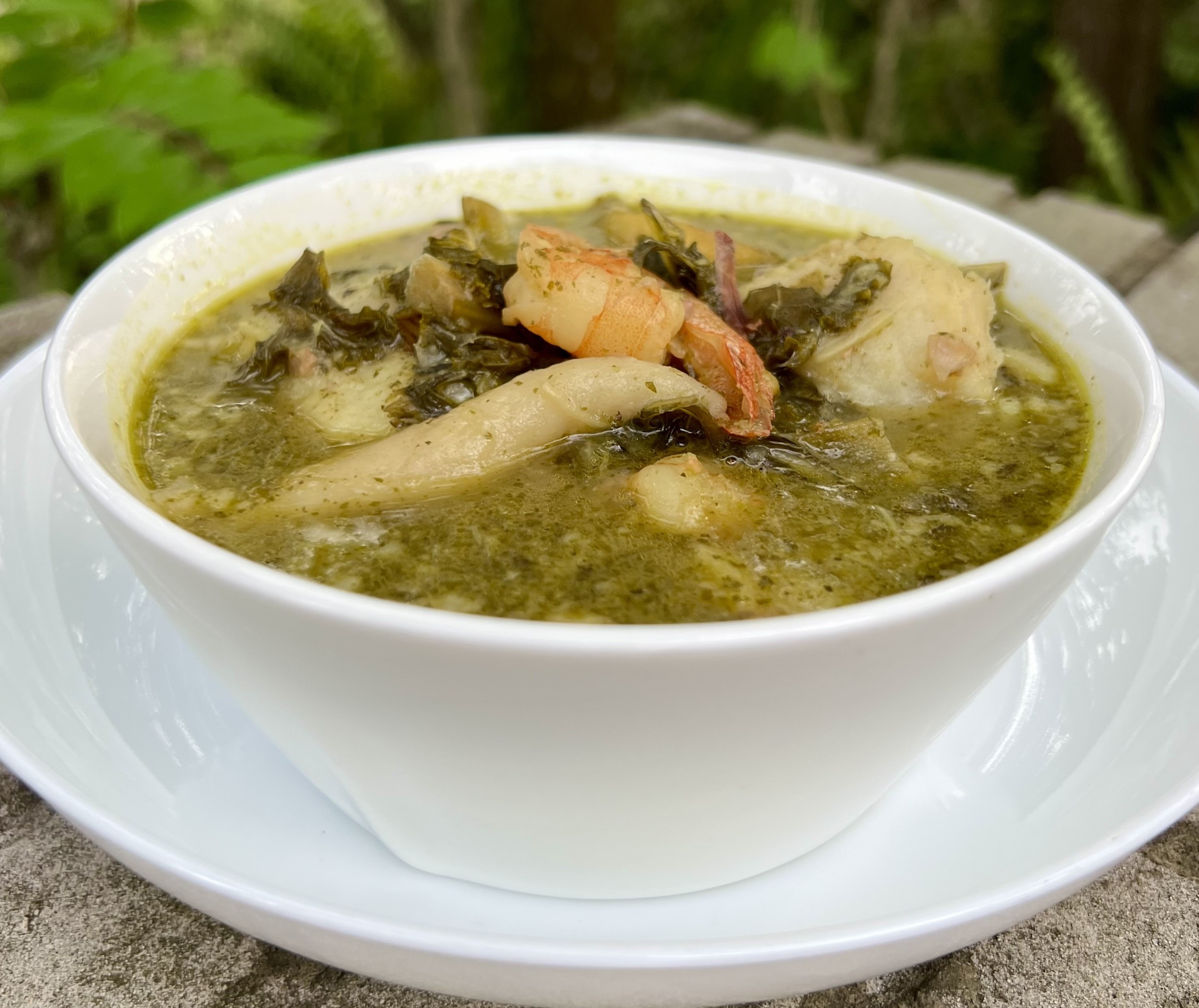
Jamaican Pepperpot

The Indigenous inhabitants of Jamaica, the Taínos, developed dishes such as jerk meats, roasted fish, bammy, cassava bread, callaloo (made with native amaranth) and pepperpot (made with callaloo and Scotch bonnet pepper). Taíno influence can also be found in dishes like turned cornmeal, duckunoo, Jamaican hominy corn porridge and Saturday beef soup. They kept a stockpot in which meat, fish and vegetables were collected for soup. The Taínos also made intoxicating drinks from cassava and maize (corn ), as well as, a tree-bark based drink known for its health benefits, called mauby, which was also made with mâ'bi, the Arawak word for red sweet potato.

Many native crops and local staples, such as peppers (Scotch bonnet, cayenne pepper and other cultivars) and beans (like kidney beans) were taken to Jamaica in canoes from Mesoamerica, along with maize, sweet potato, cashew, cacao and cassava. They also cultivated chayote (cho cho), arrowroot, kenep (guinep), mammee apple, coco, squash, pumpkin, yam (yampi or cush-cush yam), peanut, guava, potato, pineapple, starapple, papaya, soursop, naseberry, custard apple, sweetsop and other native crops. According to historian, James Delbourgo, the brewing of cocoa beans, which led to the recipe for chocolate milk and traditional Jamaican chocolate tea, was practiced by the Taínos, as far back as 1494.

Cooking techniques such as jerking, grilling, roasting, smoking and barbecuing, as well as, the use of earth ovens, charcoal, pimento wood, plantain or banana leaves and corn husks in cooking, can be traced back to them. They often wrapped meats in papaya leaves to tenderize them. Food colouring with annatto was inherited from the Taínos, as were calabash (gourd) bowls and utensils, and tools which were used to grind cocoa beans, corn, and cassava for flour and bammy the traditional way. These include stone and wooden mortars, pestles, grinders and graters called metate, mano and guaio/guayo, a long funnel-shaped basket called a matapi, used for extracting cassava juice, and a flat earthenware griddle (burén) used for baking cassava breads.

==== Spanish and Portuguese influences ====
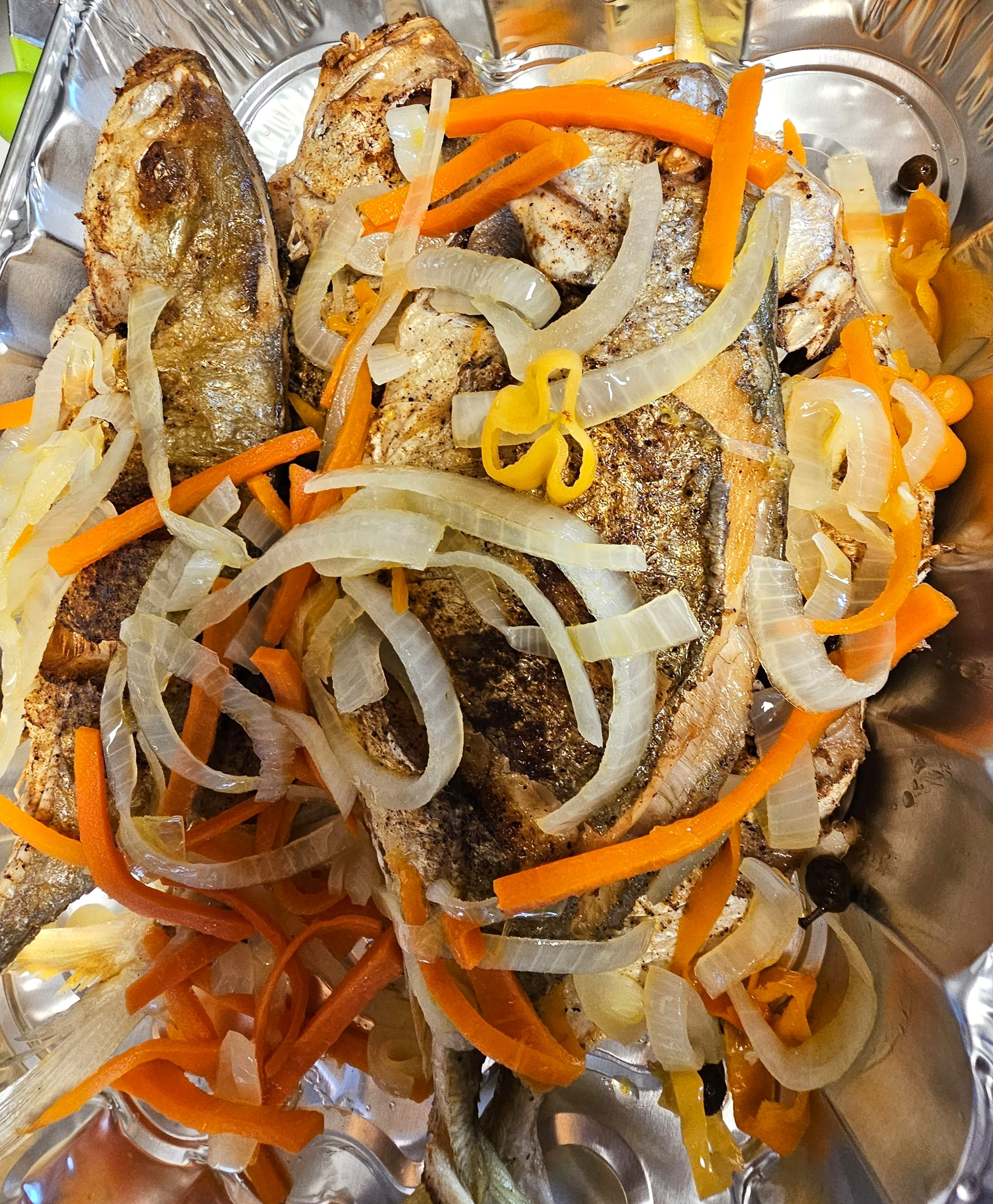
Fried escoveitch fish

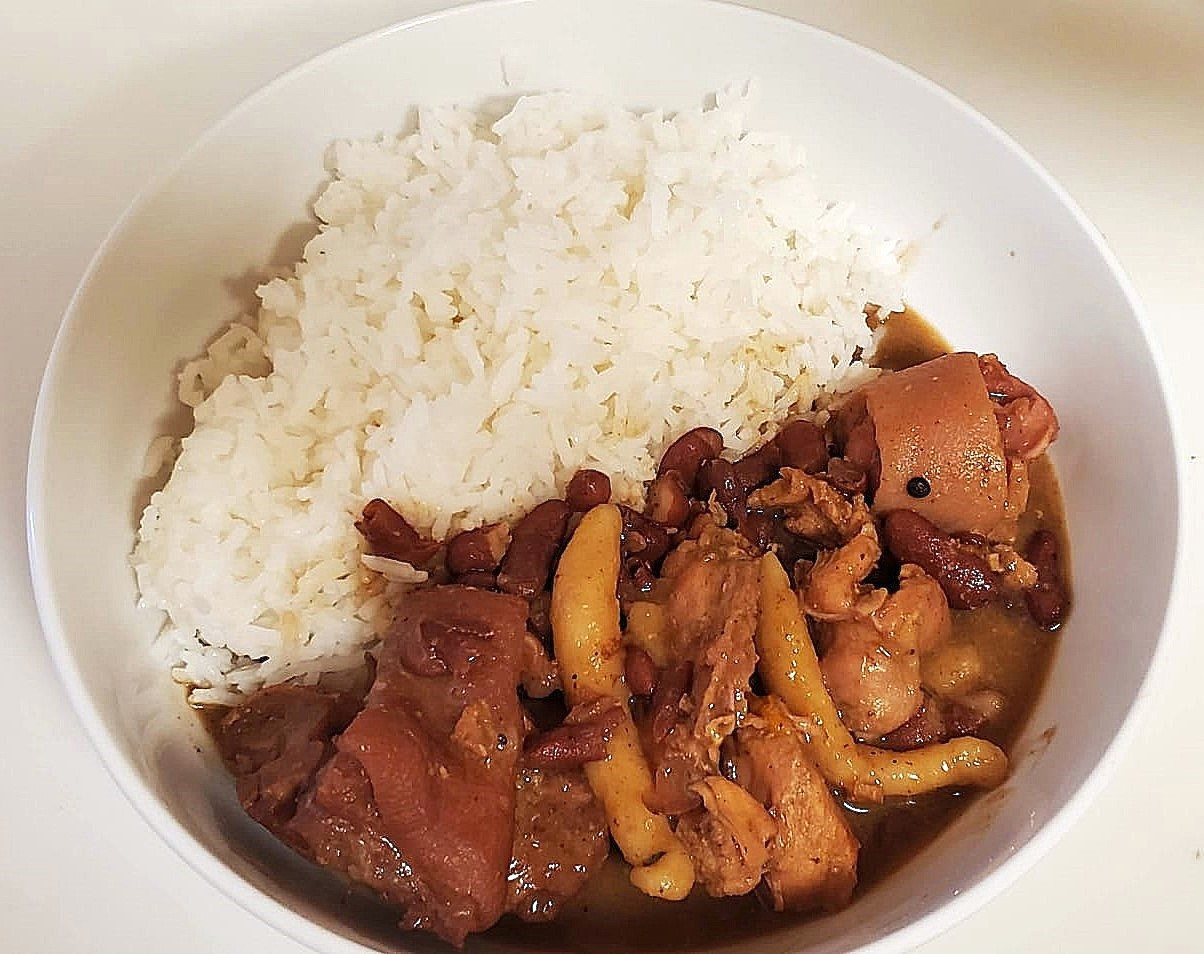
Stew peas with cured meats

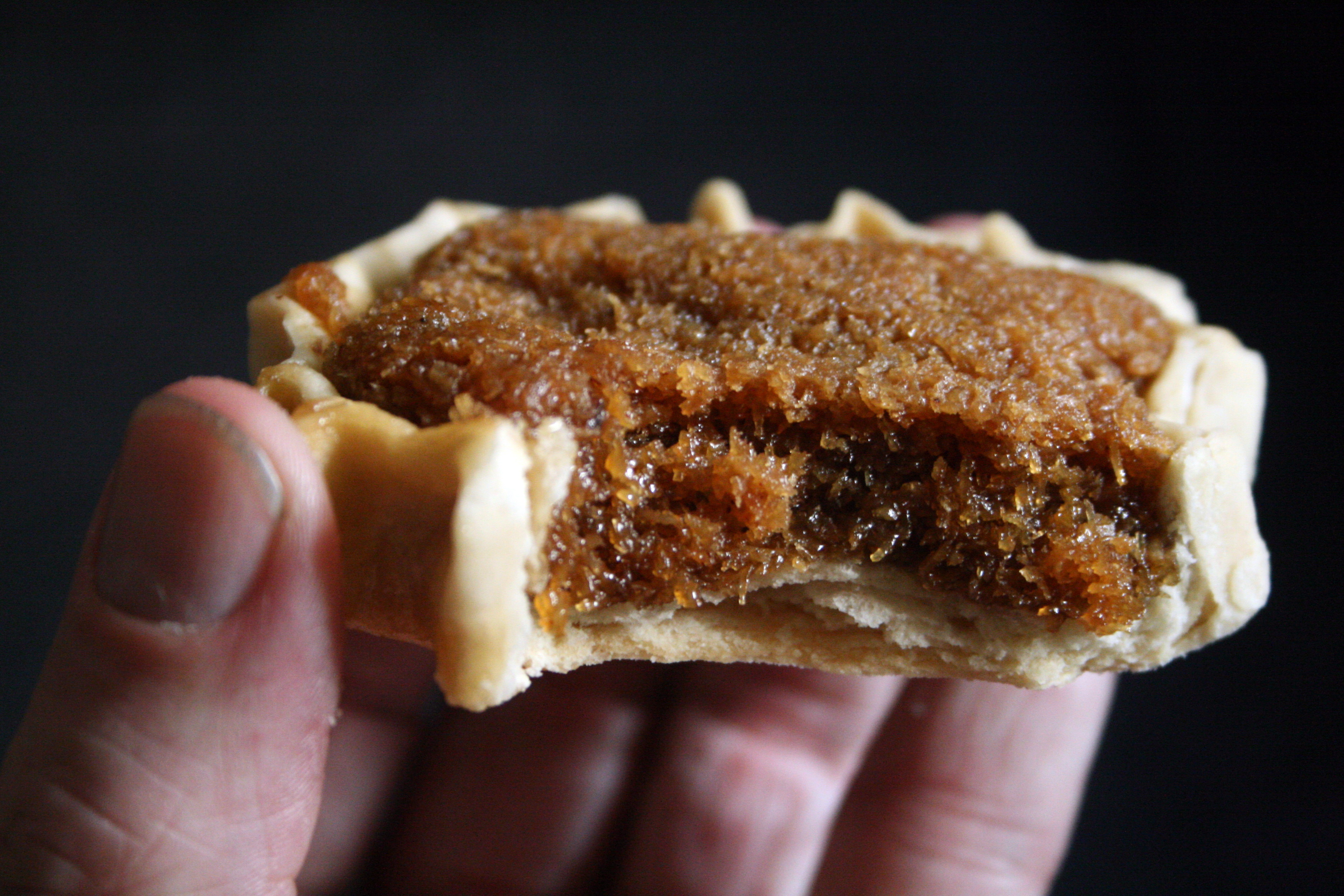
Gizzada

The Spanish, the first European arrivals to Jamaica, contributed many dishes and introduced a variety of crops and ingredients to the island— such as Asian rice, sugar cane, citrus like sweet orange, sour orange (Seville and Valencia), lime and lemon, tamarind, cacao, coconut, tomato, avocado, banana, grape, pomegranate, plantain, lettuce, carrot, fig and many other fruits and vegetables. They also brought cattle, goat, pig and other livestock that are eaten on the island, as well as, rum, herbs and spices such as rosemary, thyme, garlic, onion, oregano, ginger and others.

Many beans and pea dishes, stews, fish and rice dishes that are Jamaican staples, originated in Spain. Spanish culinary contributions include the vinegary escovitch/escoveitch fish (Spanish escabeche), Creole dishes like rice and peas, Jamaican Spanish rice, stews like brown stew meats (chicken, pork, cow foot, oxtail etc.), stew peas and red peas soup with cured meats, as well as, the soaking of fruits in wine for desserts like Jamaican wedding and Christmas cakes. Spanish and Portuguese Jews who had escaped the inquisition in the 1500s, also introduced coconut macaroons, gizzada, steamed and fried fish, saltfish fritters and salted codfish which is used in breakfast dishes and Jamaica's national dish— ackee and saltfish. It has become a staple from the time it was eaten by enslaved Africans as a long-lasting source of affordable protein. By the 1700s, saltfish, also called "the faithful friend" in Portuguese cuisine, was not only consumed as a cheap, accessible source of protein, as it had become a staple food for most Portuguese people, including the upper echelons of society — like escoveitch, it has been a dietary mainstay during Lent and other holy days. The Jamaican patty, a pasty or empanada-styled turnover filled with spiced meat was influenced by the Spanish and Cornish. Sweets like peanut drops/cake, coconut drops, peanut brittle and grater cake have Portuguese and Spanish influences, as well as, African and Middle Eastern influences.

Cooking and preservation techniques which include stewing, frying, brining, pickling and curing meats were also influenced by the Spaniards.

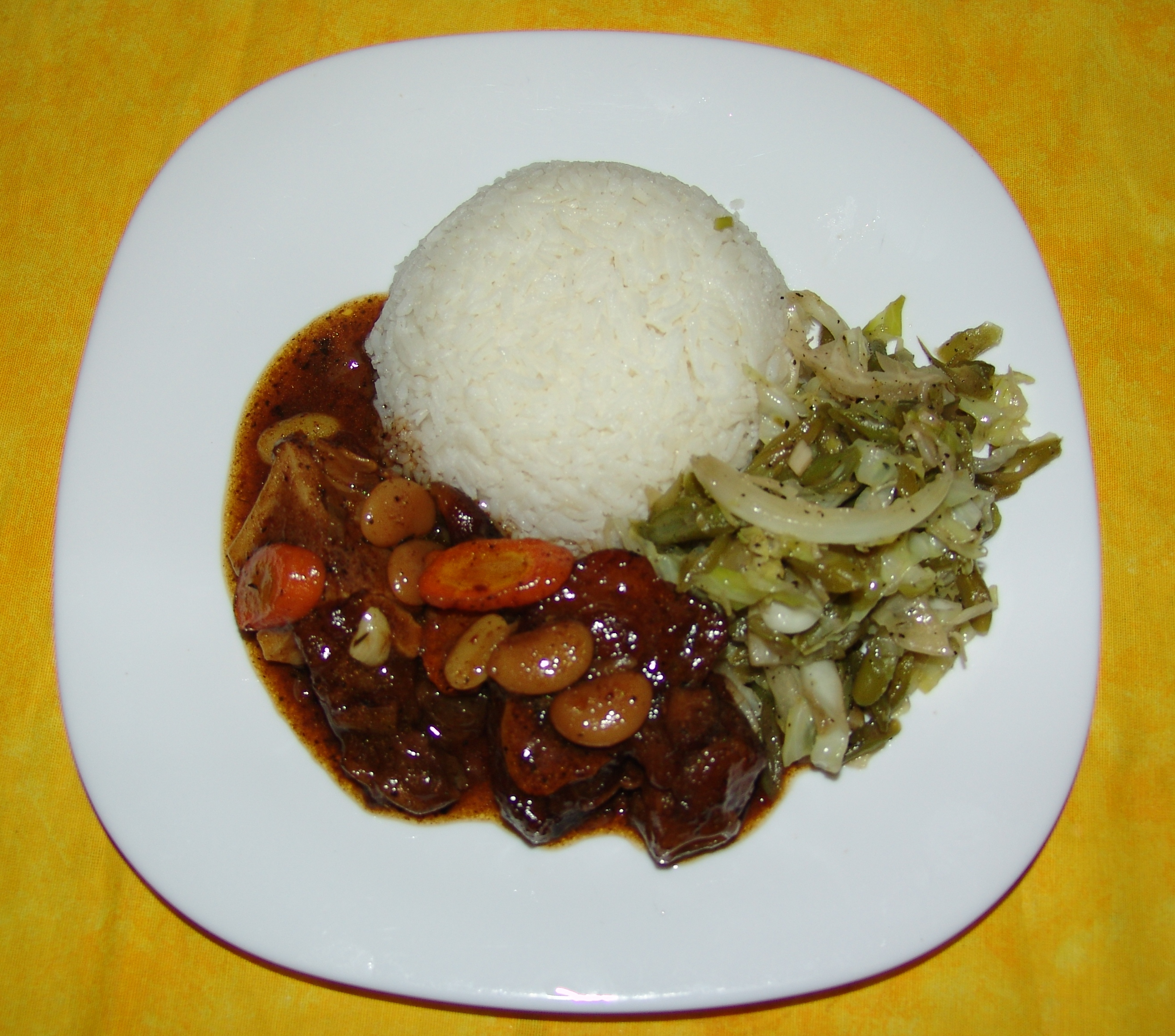
Cow foot and beans

==== African influences ====
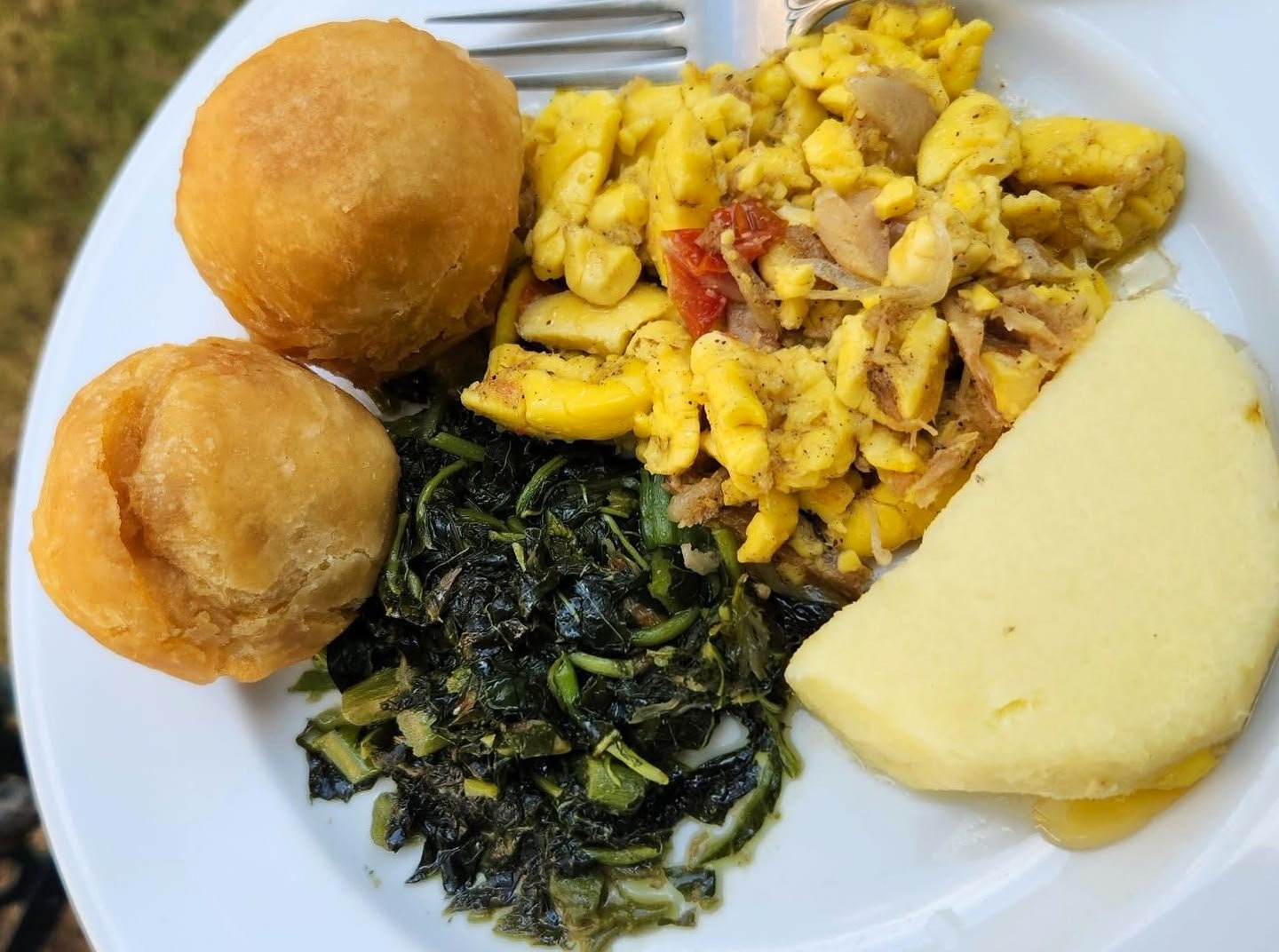
Jamaican ackee and saltfish, callaloo, yam and fried dumplings

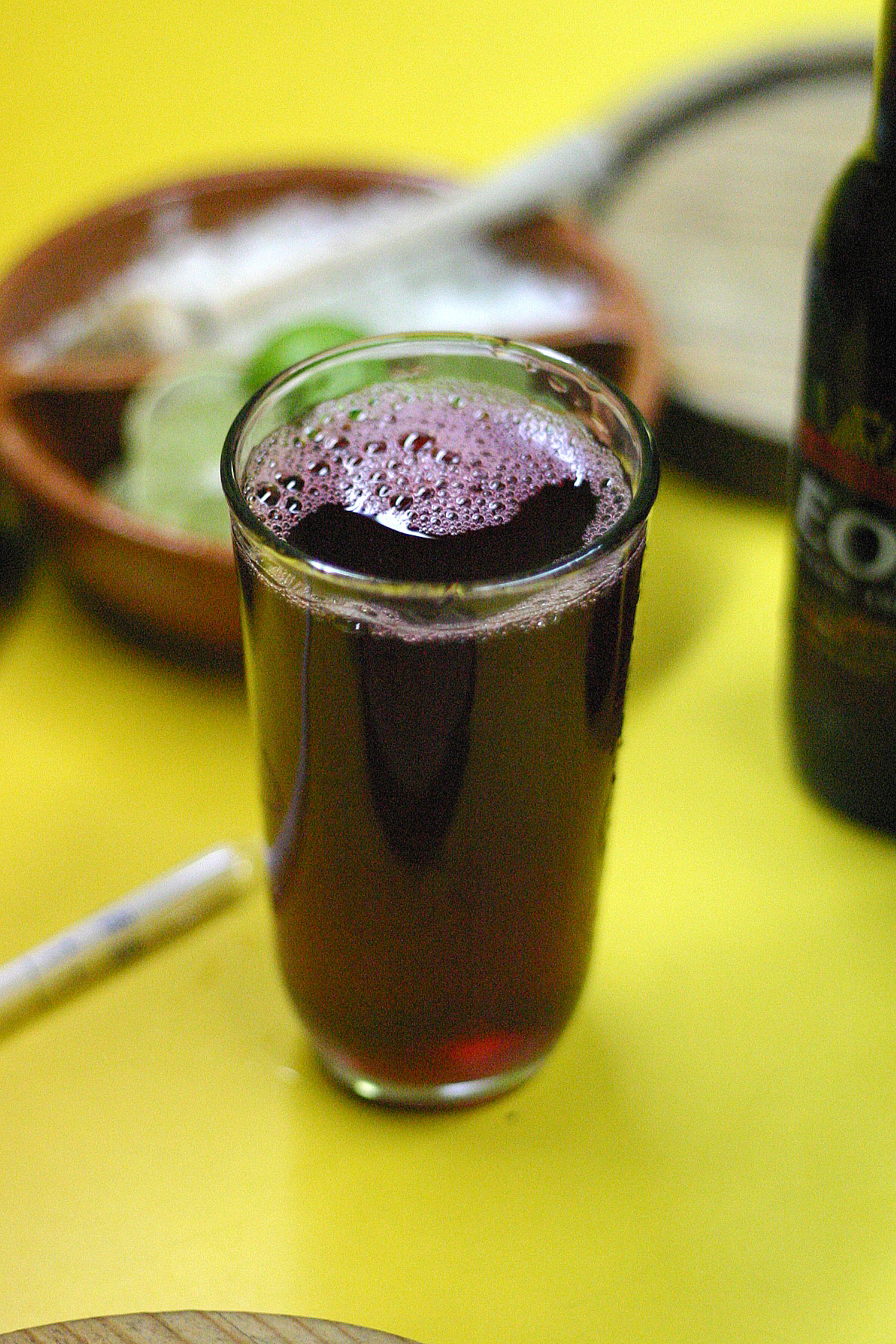
Sorrel drink

Influences from African cuisine developed on the island as a result of waves of slavery and indentureship, which can be found in dishes like okra, taro and callaloo— made with indigenous amaranth grown and used by the Taínos, and comparable to the Angolan dish calulu. Along with the Europeans and Indians, Africans contributed to the cultivation of rice, cow peas and pigeon peas (known as 'gungo' locally) in the Americas, which are key ingredients in some local dishes. While some crops were taken from Africa on ships by the Europeans, it is believed that enslaved Africans also brought seeds of plants which they grew, such as African rice, kola nut (bissy), sesame, watermelon, bonavist beans and sorrel. Their knowledge of cultivating and using crops that were introduced by the Europeans, from Africa and other regions, helped to shape cuisines in the Americas including Jamaica's.

African influences can be seen in one-pot dishes like seasoned rice, rice and peas, callaloo rice, ackee and saltfish and turned cornmeal. Dishes prepared with offals like tripe and bean, cow foot stew, cow skin or cow cod soup and mannish water (goat head soup), were also influenced by them. They adopted and added the use of certain spices and ground provisions to variations of dishes from other cultures, as well as, Creole dishes that were created on the island during the colonial era. Sorrel drink, one of Jamaica's Christmas mainstays, has African and Chinese influences. It is primarily consumed as a tea and spice-infused drink, which is sometimes combined with rum. Also, sorrel is used in a variety of Jamaican products like beers, sauces, glazes, ice-creams, cakes and other desserts. Its popularity has spread to Latin America and Mexican communities in North America, where the drink is called agua de Jamaica, flor de Jamaica, rosa de Jamaica or Jamaica. Red drink, as it is called in Black American communities, has also been adopted as part of Juneteenth celebrations. A popular Jamaican sweet called Bustamante backbone or stagga back can be traced back to the Africans, along with the names of foods like "asham", "duckunoo" and "gungo".

In the past, tools like the wooden mortar and pestle were used to grind dried and roasted coffee and cocoa beans, while clay pots called 'yabba' were used for mixing cakes or puddings and seasoning or salting meats—both of which have African origins.

==== English, Irish and Scottish influences ====
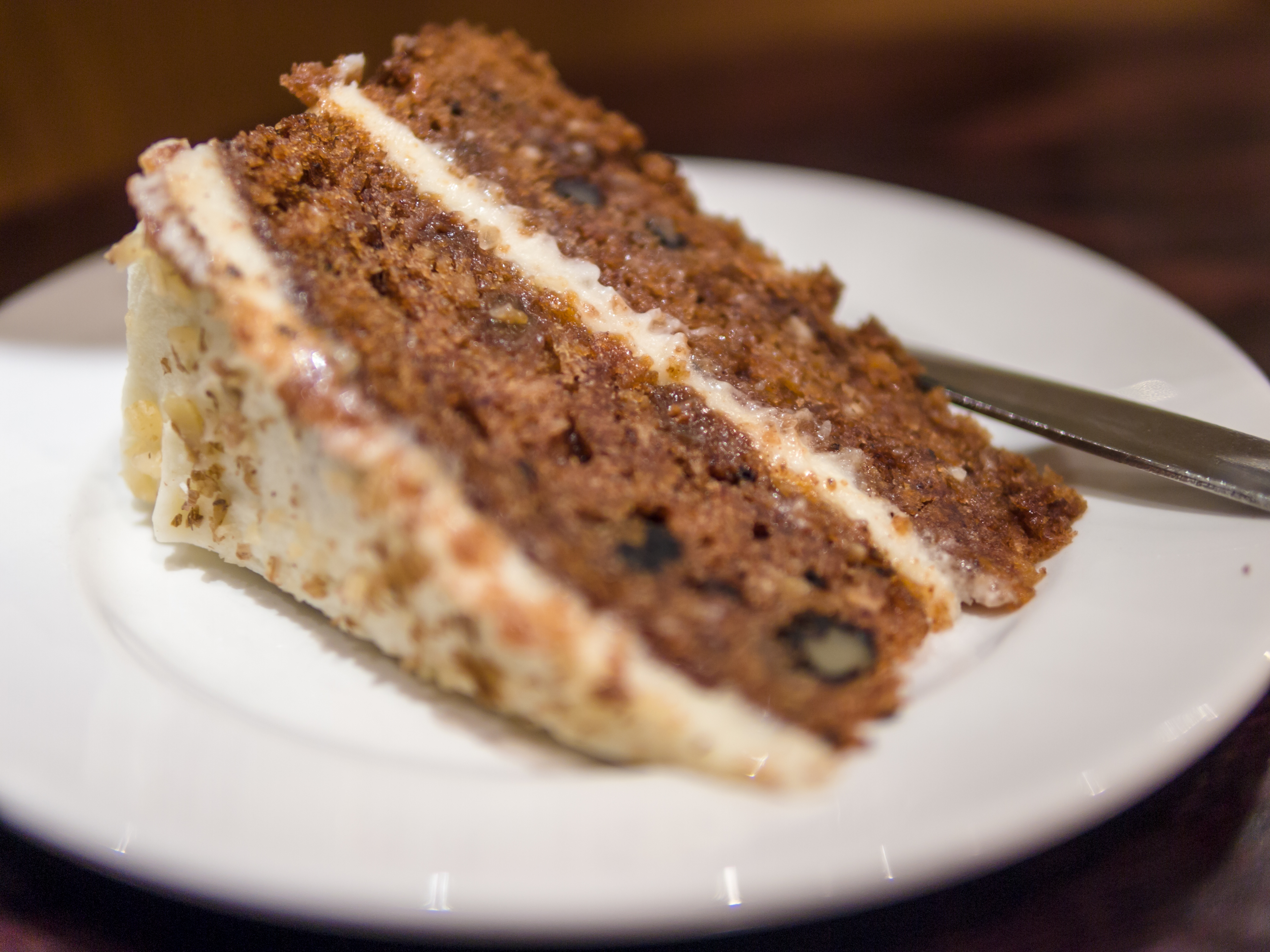
Carrot cake

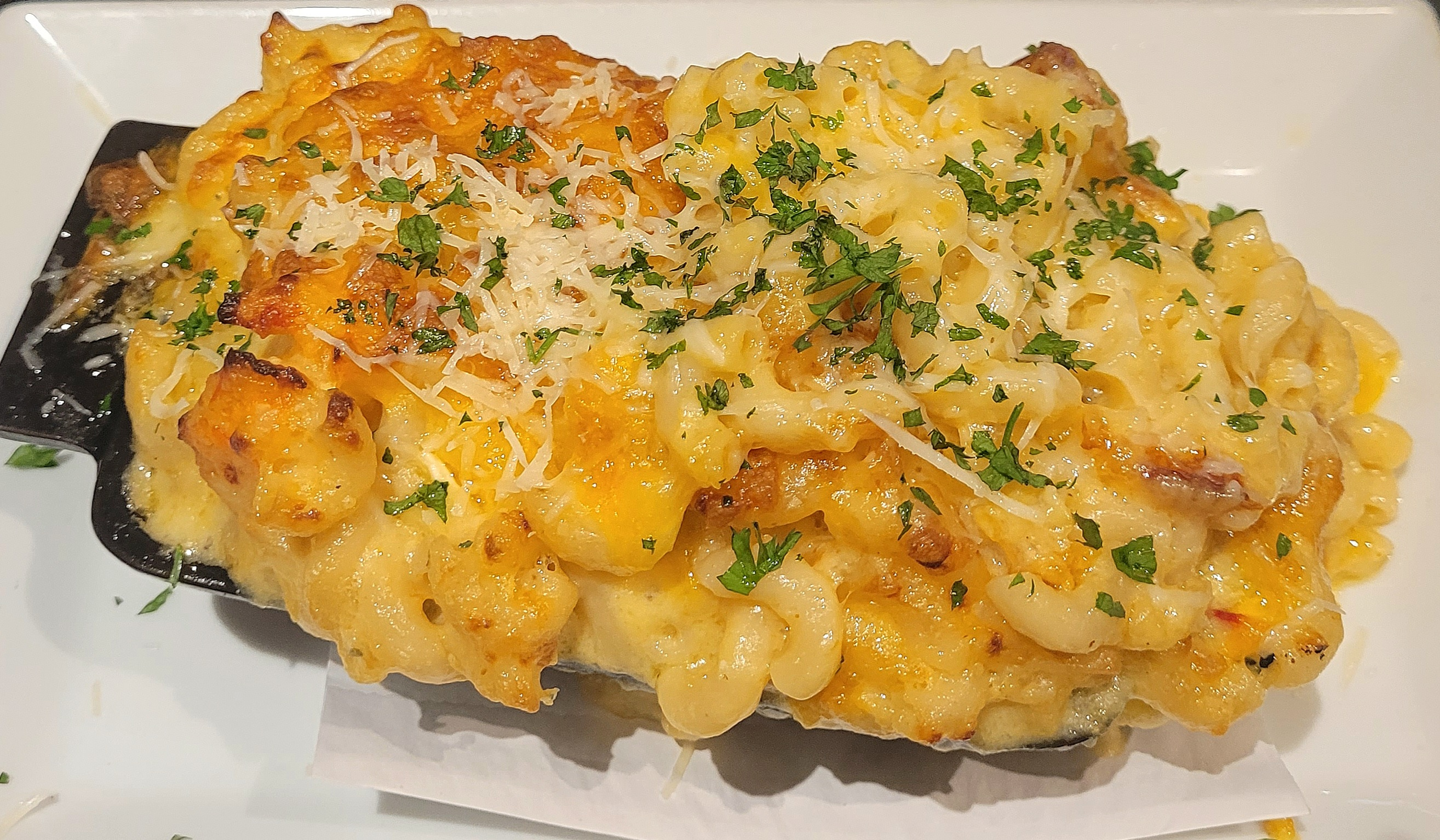
Jamaican lobster macaroni and cheese

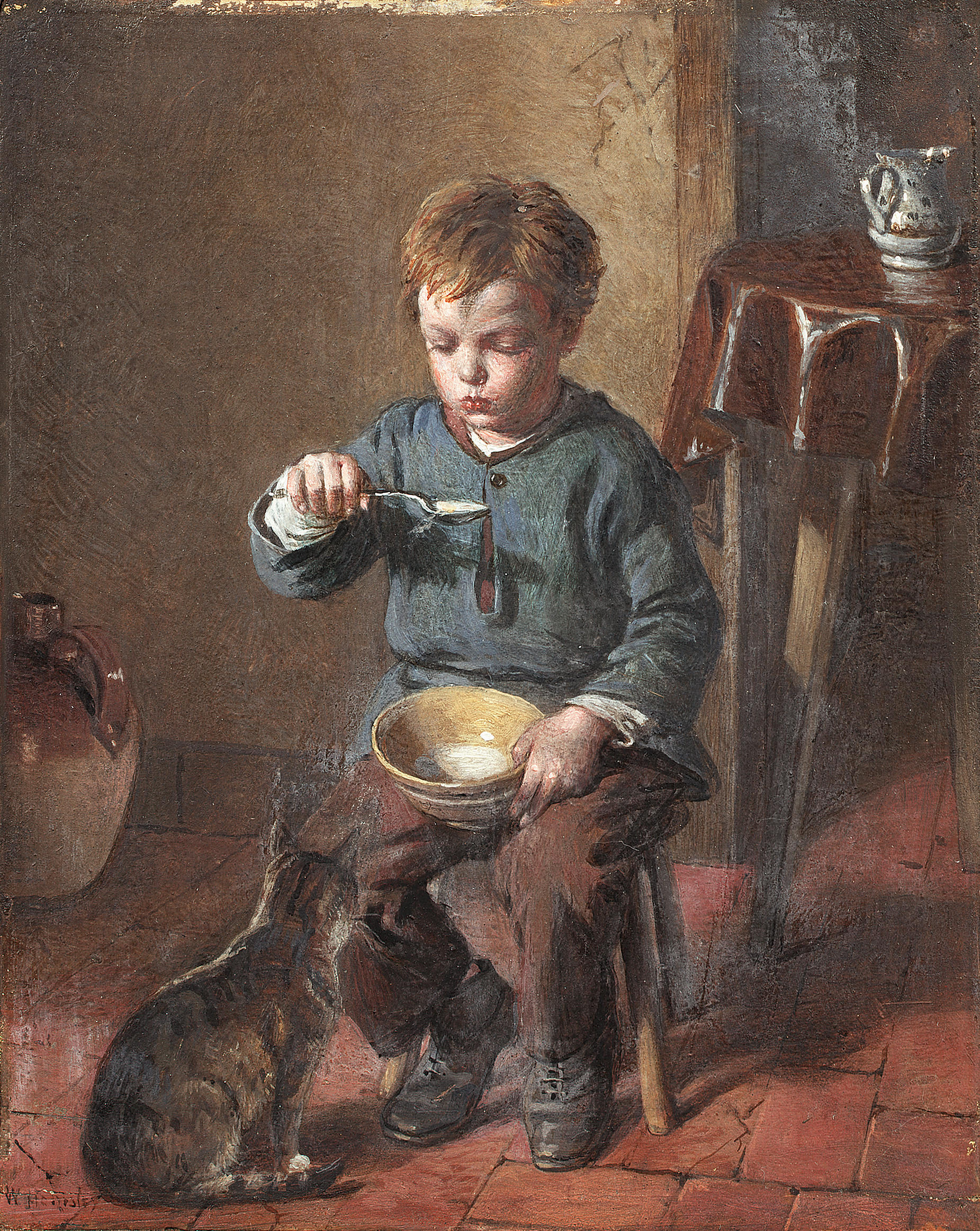
Porridge by William Hemsley c. 1893

Baked goods like puddings, rock cake, sponge cakes, fruit cakes, muffins, breads, pies, biscuits and spiced bun were influenced by the British— who ruled the island until its independence, as well as, indentured labourers from England, Scotland and Ireland who arrived on the island after the abolition of slavery to replace slaves. As such, Jamaican Easter bun and cheese, jams, other sweet treats like confectioneries and gelatin desserts, teas, macaroni and cheese, and some colonial era Creole dishes have British influences. Sunday roast variations which include pot roast meats, potato and vegetables, as well as, breakfast dishes which include baked beans (adopted from Native Americans by the British), are made in Jamaica. British influences can be seen in the way Jamaicans prepare dinners for holidays and Sundays. Irish moss and porridges were influenced by the Irish and Scottish respectively. Also, deep frying, a cooking technique used to prepare dishes like Jamaican fried chicken, fried dumpling and festival may have been influenced by the Scots, along with the Spanish and Portuguese.

Staple crops like breadfruit, Otaheite apple, various mangoes, rose apple, coffee, rice (Gold Seede), ackee and black pepper were introduced to the island by the British. They also contributed to the distillation of rum, which they exported and traded along with molasses for flour, pork and pickled fish. Additionally, the introduction and development of beers like stout, porter and ale can be traced back to the British. Their influence can be found in Jamaica's toffee-like sweet, Bustamante backbone.

Due to the migration of British settlers, enslaved and emancipated Afro-Jamaicans and Creole Jamaicans to coastal Central America, between the 17th and 20th centuries, Jamaican dishes some of which were influenced by the British, were introduced to Belize and the Caribbean coast of Costa Rica, Nicaragua, Panama, Honduras, Guatemala and San Andrés, Providencia and Santa Catalina.

==== Indian influences ====
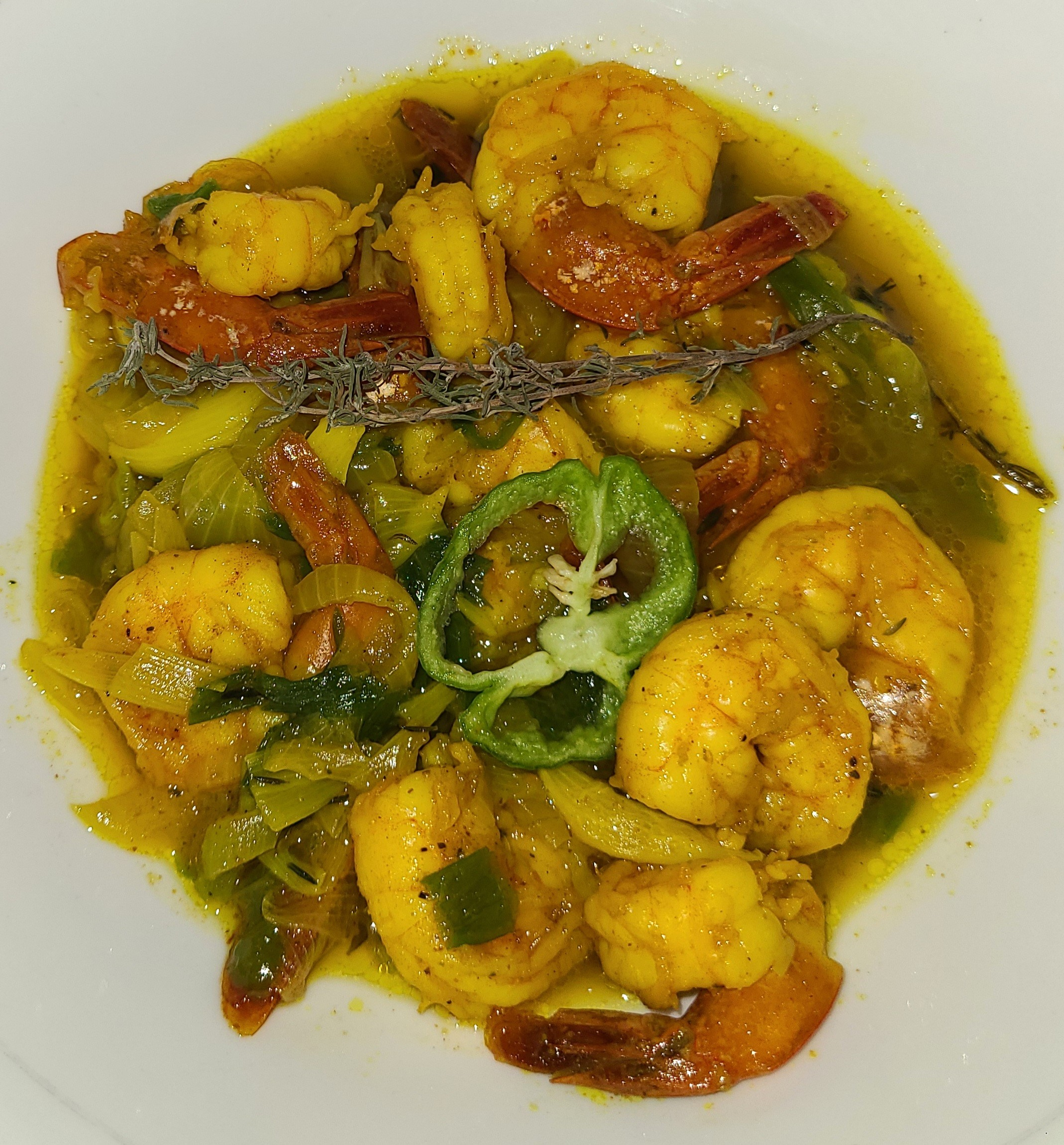
Curry shrimp

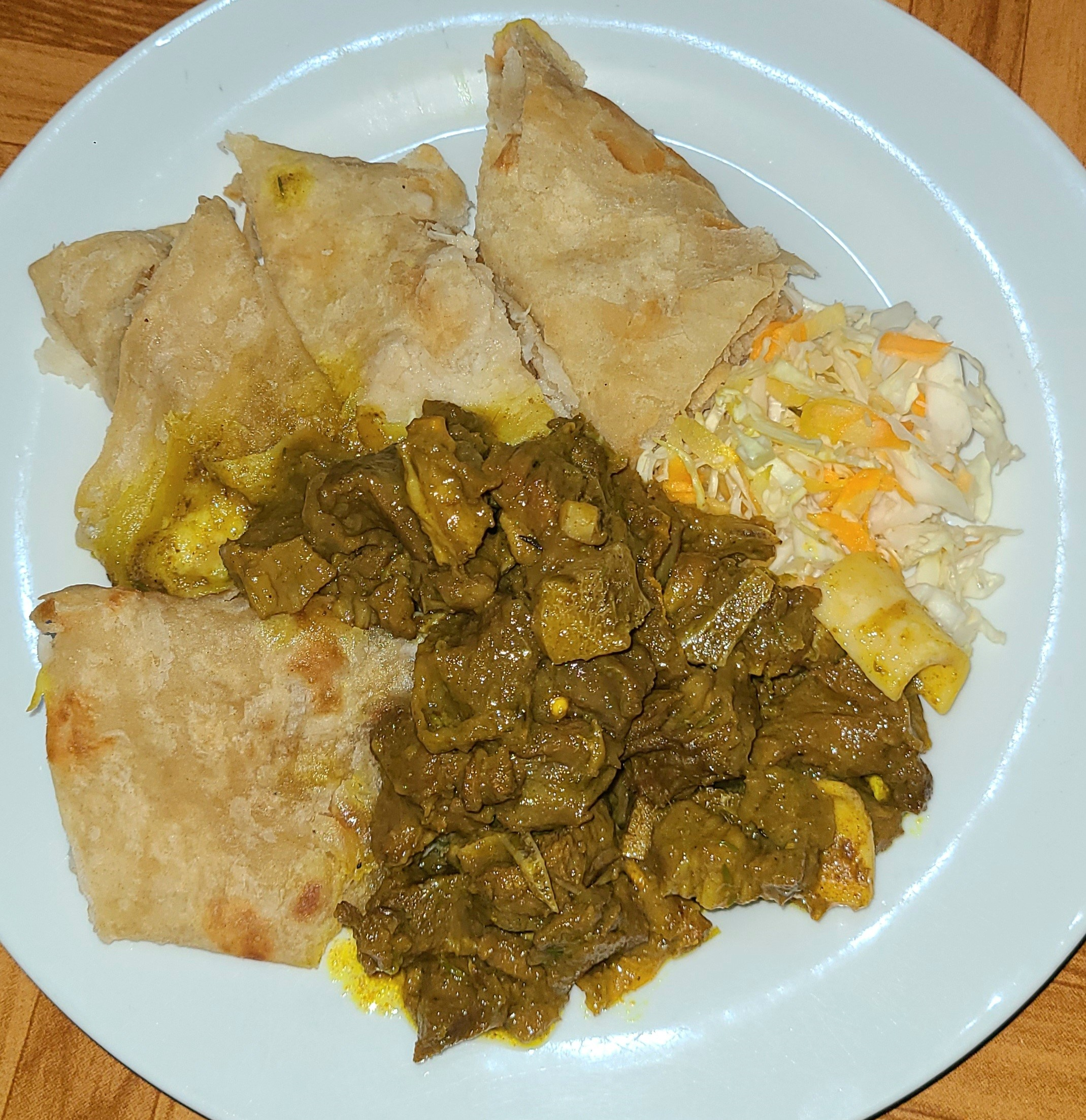
Curry goat and roti

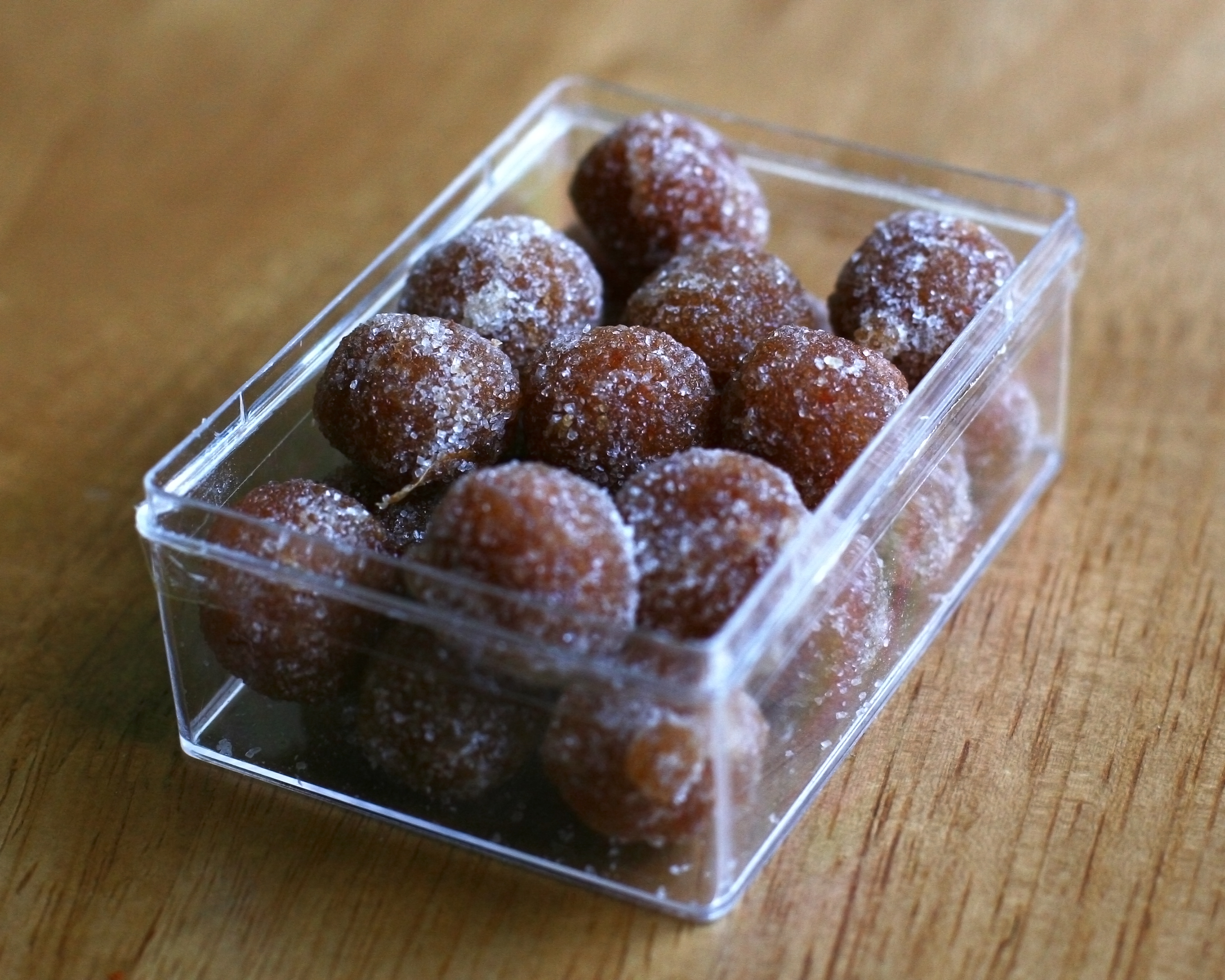
Tamarind balls

During the period of indentureship other labourers migrated to Jamaica from India, China, Germany and the Azores in Portugal. Consequently, East Indian influences can be found in Jamaican cuisine like roti, lentil dishes like dhal and a variety of ginger and curried dishes. The Indians brought curry and turmeric to Jamaica, which have been modified to create Jamaican curry powder, a key ingredient in dishes such as curried goat/mutton, chicken and seafood (shrimp, lobster, crab, fish and conch). Indian influences can also be found in eggplant dishes, pelau, pickled unripe mango (with salt and pepper), roasted saltfish choka, takari dishes (with potato, mango and pumpkin), pholourie and sweets which have been modified like gulgula and khurma. Along with spices, they brought jackfruit, plums, tamarind, banyan, neem and bilimbi (also called 'kamranga' locally)— which is pickled and served as a relish.

While Indian influences are present in some Jamaican Creole or fusion dishes, and vegetarian dishes in ital cuisine (prepared by Jamaican Rastafarians), some of the aforementioned (like the sweets and relish) and the cooking of unripe jackfruit and bamboo shoots, which have become popular vegetarian dishes internationally, are not widely prepared by all locals. Also, Indian restaurants are operated on the island by more recent Indian migrants (not Indo-Jamaicans), which offer flavours from India that differ from Indo-Jamaican cuisine.

A flat iron griddle called tawah, which is used to make flatbreads, was adopted from the Indians. The karahi pot, also used by Chinese Jamaicans, originated in India. The Indians were the first to manage growing rice in Jamaica, establishing the island's first successful rice mill in the 1890s, and they dominated the island's vegetable production until well into the 1940s.

==== Chinese influences ====
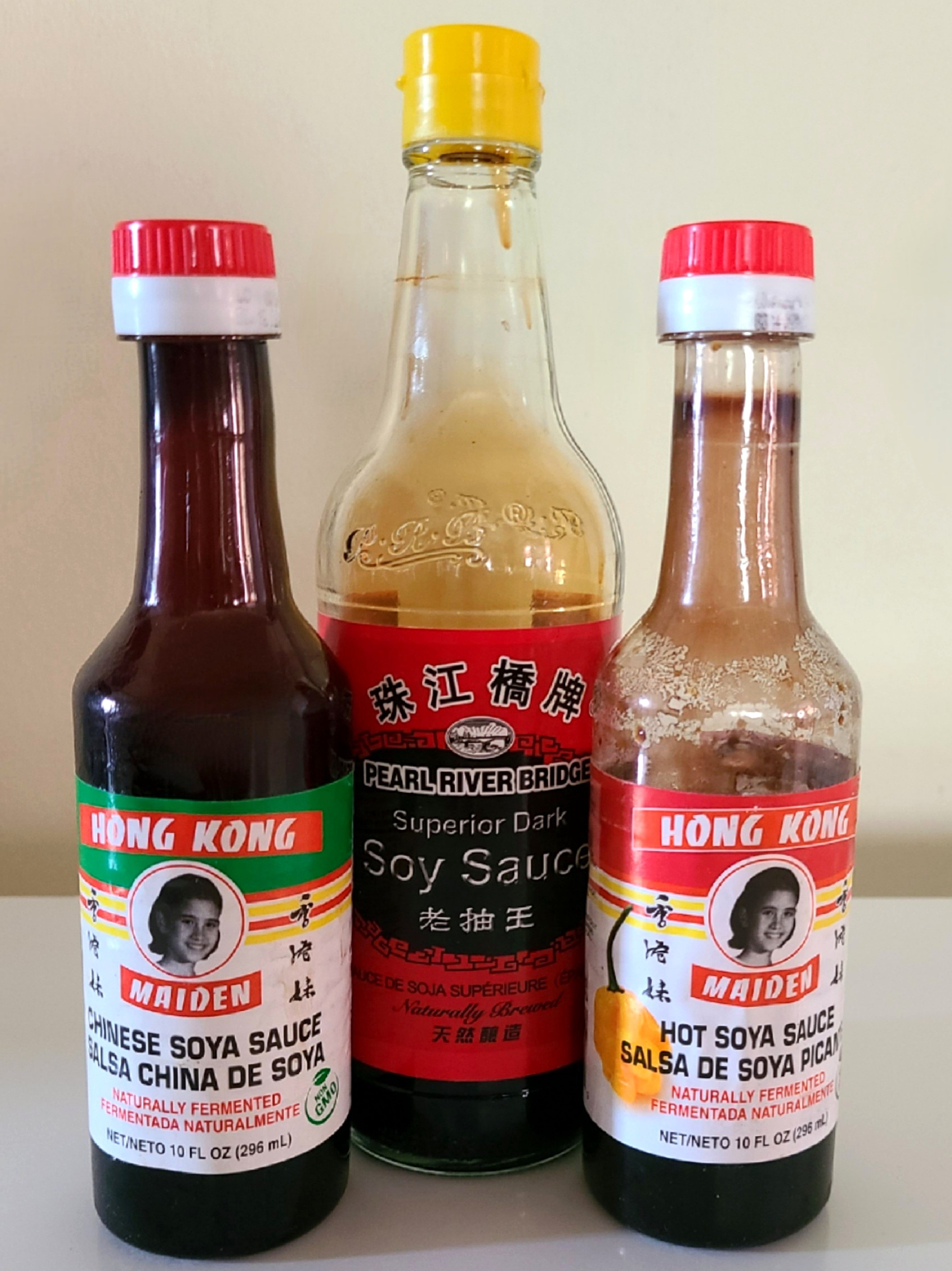
Jamaican and Chinese soy sauces— one of which is Scotch-bonnet infused.

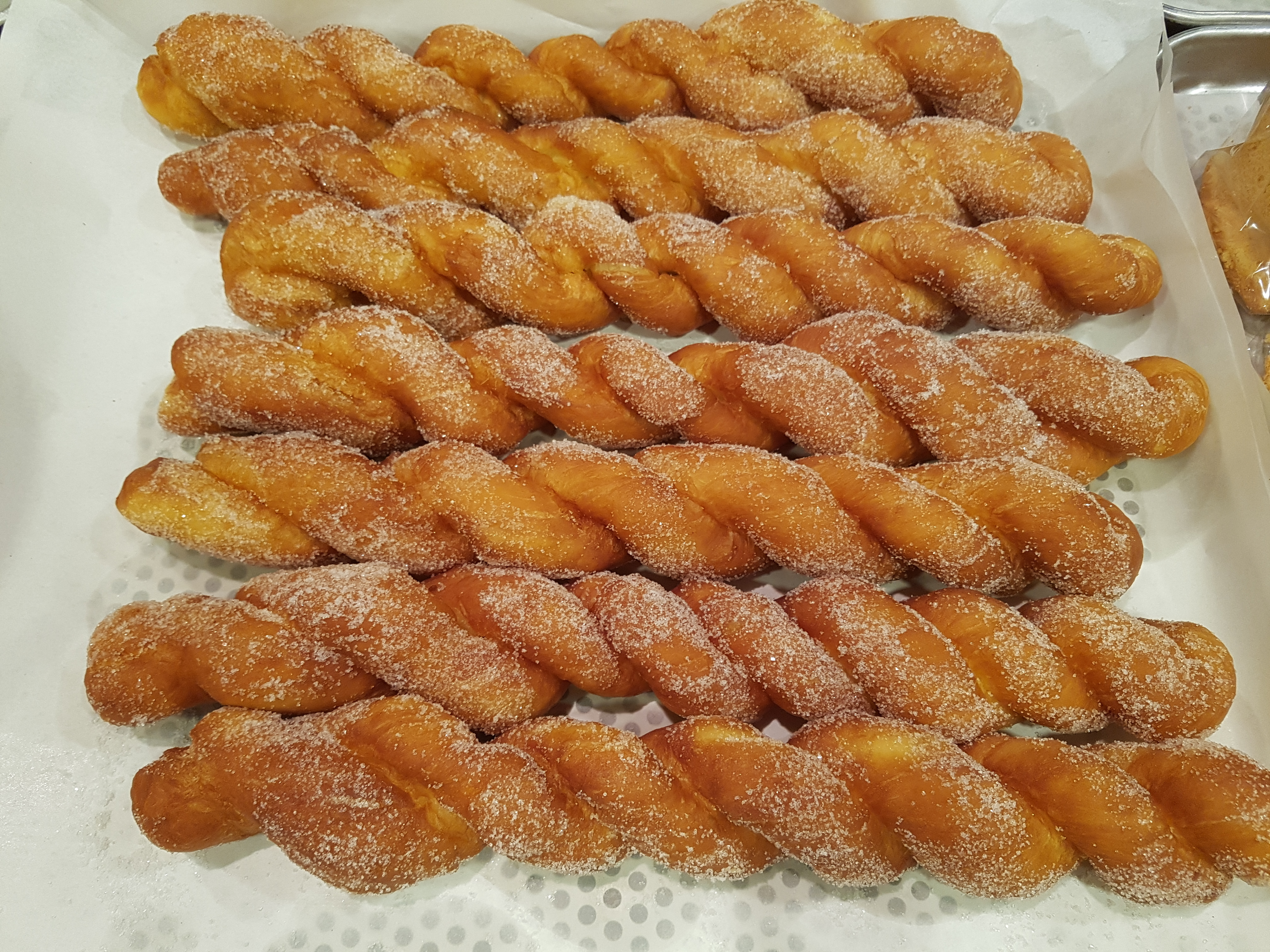
Twist donuts

Chinese labourers, mostly Hakka, who arrived during indentureship also contributed to Jamaican cuisine. Chinese (especially Hakka and Cantonese) influences can be found in dishes with pak choy, pork, dungoo (Chinese mushrooms) and mustard. Upon arrival many of the original ingredients used in China were not available, and they were imported later, so the Chinese had to improvise and adapt in order to recreate their dishes— as such, Jamaican Chinese food emerged. In the 1940s, Jamaican tamarind was substituted for Chinese sour plums, key ingredients in the preparation of a popular Chinese duck dish.

Their most notable culinary contributions are hard dough bread and the use of soy sauce, ginger and escallion on meats, particularly in Jamaican brown stew and fricassee dishes. They also added the use of ginger and five-spice to Jamaican beverages like sorrel, influenced other Jamaican fusion dishes, and contributed stir-fry, chow mein, chop suey, fried rice, sweet and sour meats/seafood, pineapple chicken, Szechuan chicken and others— which can be found on the menus of non-Chinese local restaurants. In Jamaica, many Chinese restaurants have their own variations of Chinese dishes, modified with a local twist, like "Jamaicanized" wontons, fried rice with saltfish and barbie-fry chicken. Commonly prepared local Chinese dishes include Jamaican malah chicken, pork with muknee or hamchoy, cha su (Cantonese-style roast pork), pork and yam, foo gwa/gah (stuffed bitter melon known in Jamaica as cerasee), chicken and pig tails, hot pepper chicken (pork, beef and shrimp), Chinese five-spice roast meats, sui/suey mein, lo mein, "2 or 3 meat choy fan" (which includes a combination of dishes), Chinese-style curry chicken, meats cooked in black bean sauce, shrimp, chicken or beef broccoli, char-siu pork and others. They have also contributed condiments like oyster sauce, hoisin sauce, sweet and sour sauce, satay sauce and Scotch bonnet-infused soy sauce, sesame oil and various noodles. Jamaican twist donut (a variation of mahua) and moon cake are of Chinese origin.

A cast iron pot called 'Chinese karahi' (a Cantonese-style wok) was also introduced by the Chinese, along with the pow wok and technique of stir-frying. Chinese Jamaican families who owned most of the island's bakeries, also perfected making Jamaican patties, which they commercialized locally in the 1960s and 70s— contributing to the dish's popularity and demand.

==== French influences ====
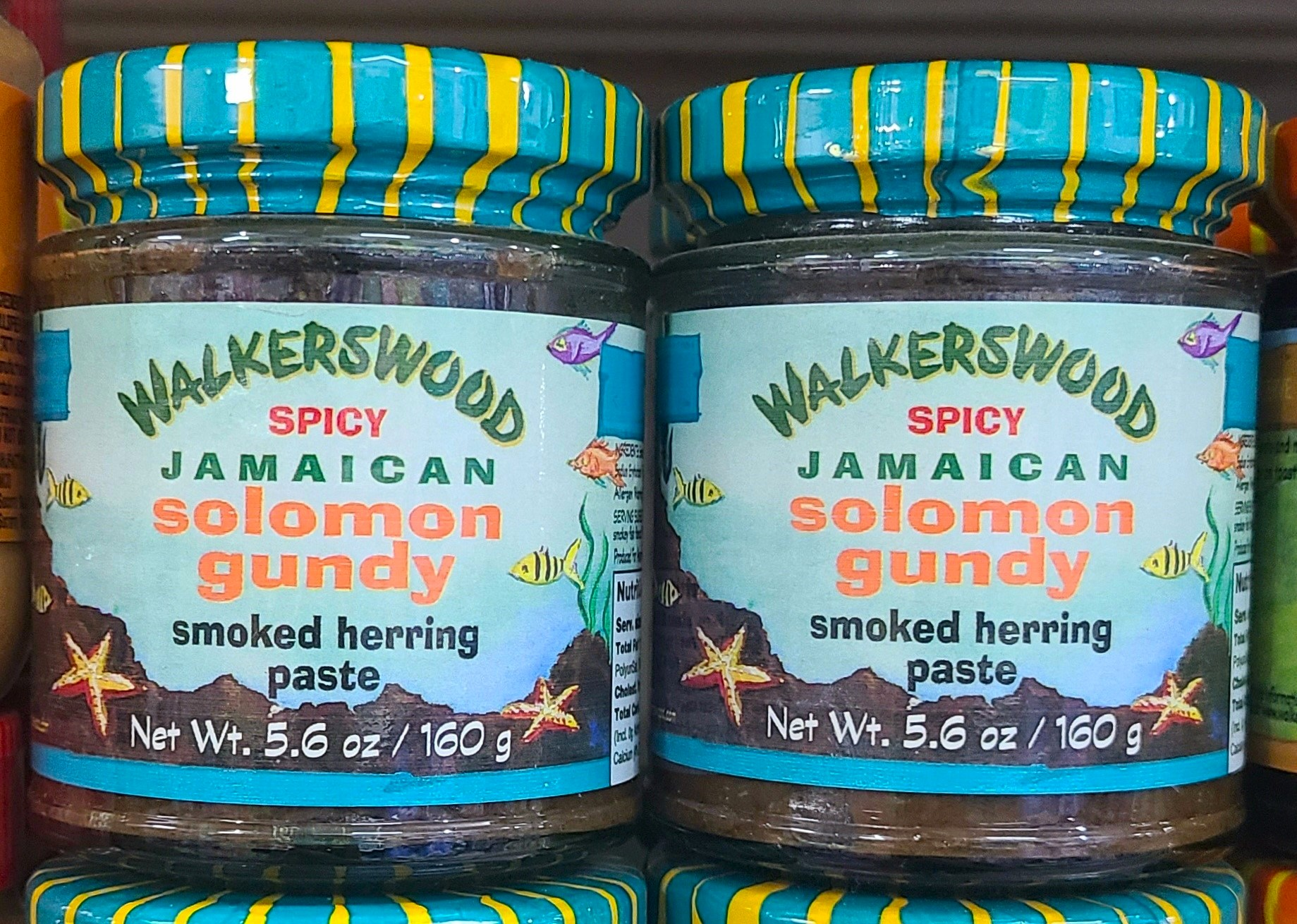
Jamaican smoked herring pâté

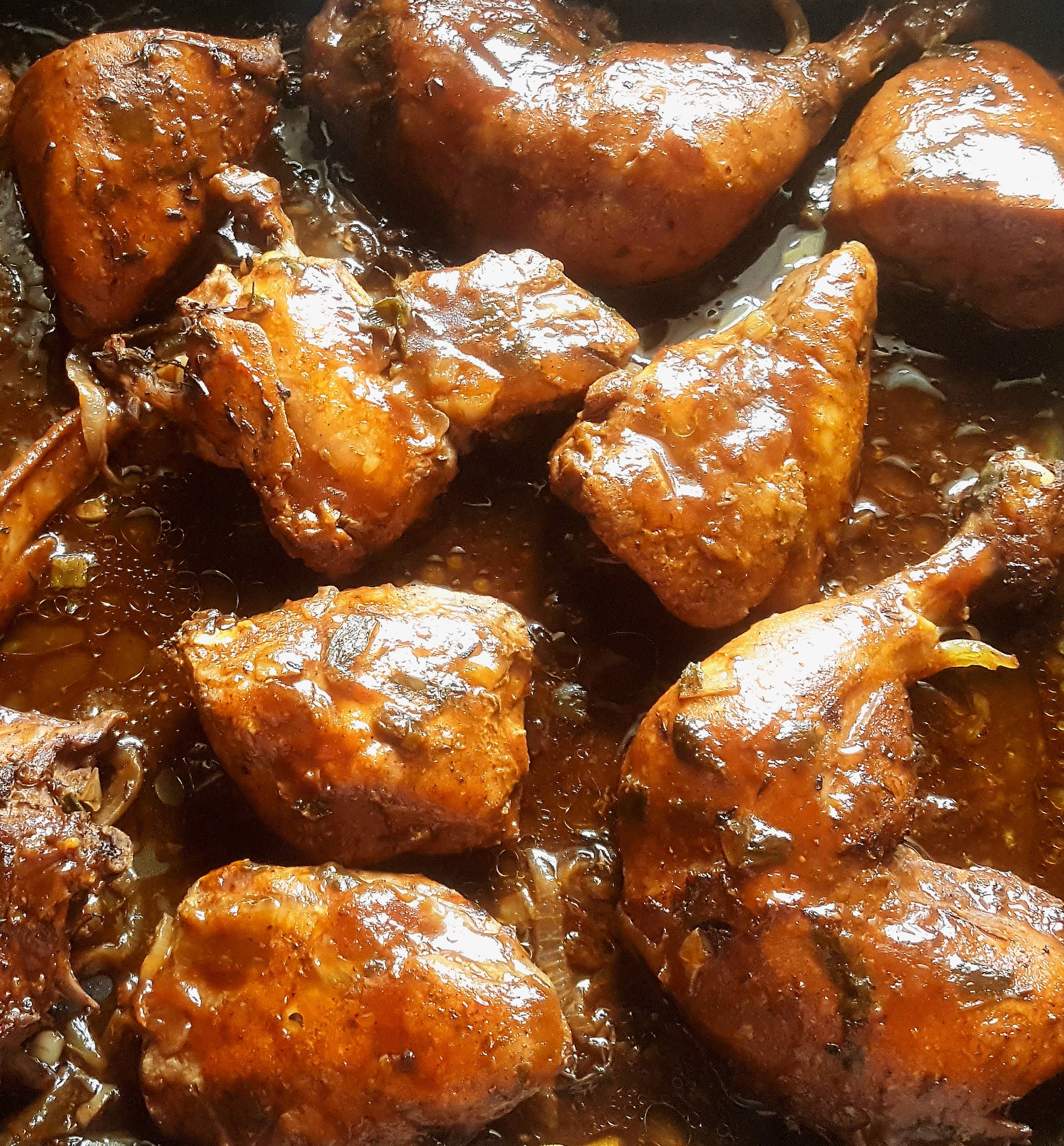
Jamaican fricassée chicken (not to be confused with brown stew chicken)

The French, possibly those who fled from Haiti during different periods, or French Jews who went to Jamaica during the inquisition, along with the Spanish, may have influenced dishes like Jamaican fricassee chicken, lobster thermidor, casseroles and pelau made with chicken or shrimp. French and English influences can be found in the use of bouillon or stock cubes, and Jamaican smoked herring pâté called Solomon Gundy. Many Jamaican gourmet dishes, desserts and pastries like tarts, gâteaux and macarons, were adopted from the French. Local variations of French dishes like crêpe, bisque and fries are prepared in Jamaica, often incorporating local ingredients.

A variety of French cooking techniques have also been adopted by Jamaicans, including cutting techniques such as batonnet and julienne used for vegetables in escoveitch and stir-fry dishes, as well as, rondelle. Bouquet garni (made with escallion, thyme and other herbs) is used in local stews and soups, and béchamel sauce or roux are used in macaroni and cheese, stews and sauces. Other French cooking techniques which have been adopted include sautéing, blanching, braising, rotisserie and flambéing with rum. A traditional cooking tool used for Jamaican beef and pork pot roasts, called a 'Jesta pot' (Digester pot) is of French origin.

Jamaica Blue Mountain coffee and the introduction of coffea arabica to Jamaica can be traced back to one of three coffee plants sent to Martinique by King Louis XV of France— gifted to the Governor of Jamaica from the Governor of Martinique, in the 1700s. The French who fled to Jamaica during the Haitian Revolution, partly helped with the rapid expansion of the local coffee industry— French masters and their slaves brought their experience and expertise in coffee production.

==== Other European influences ====
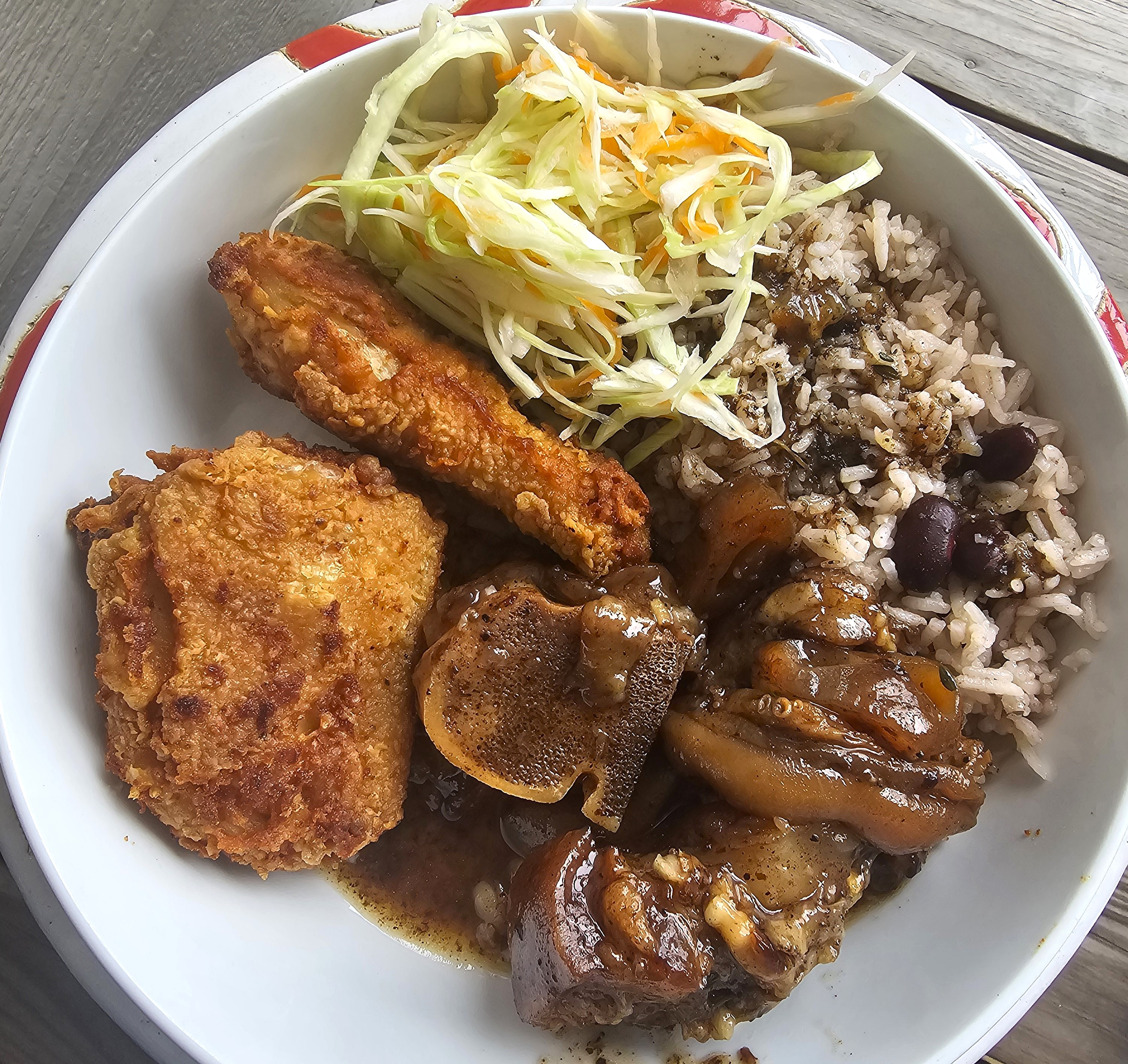
Jamaican meal with coleslaw

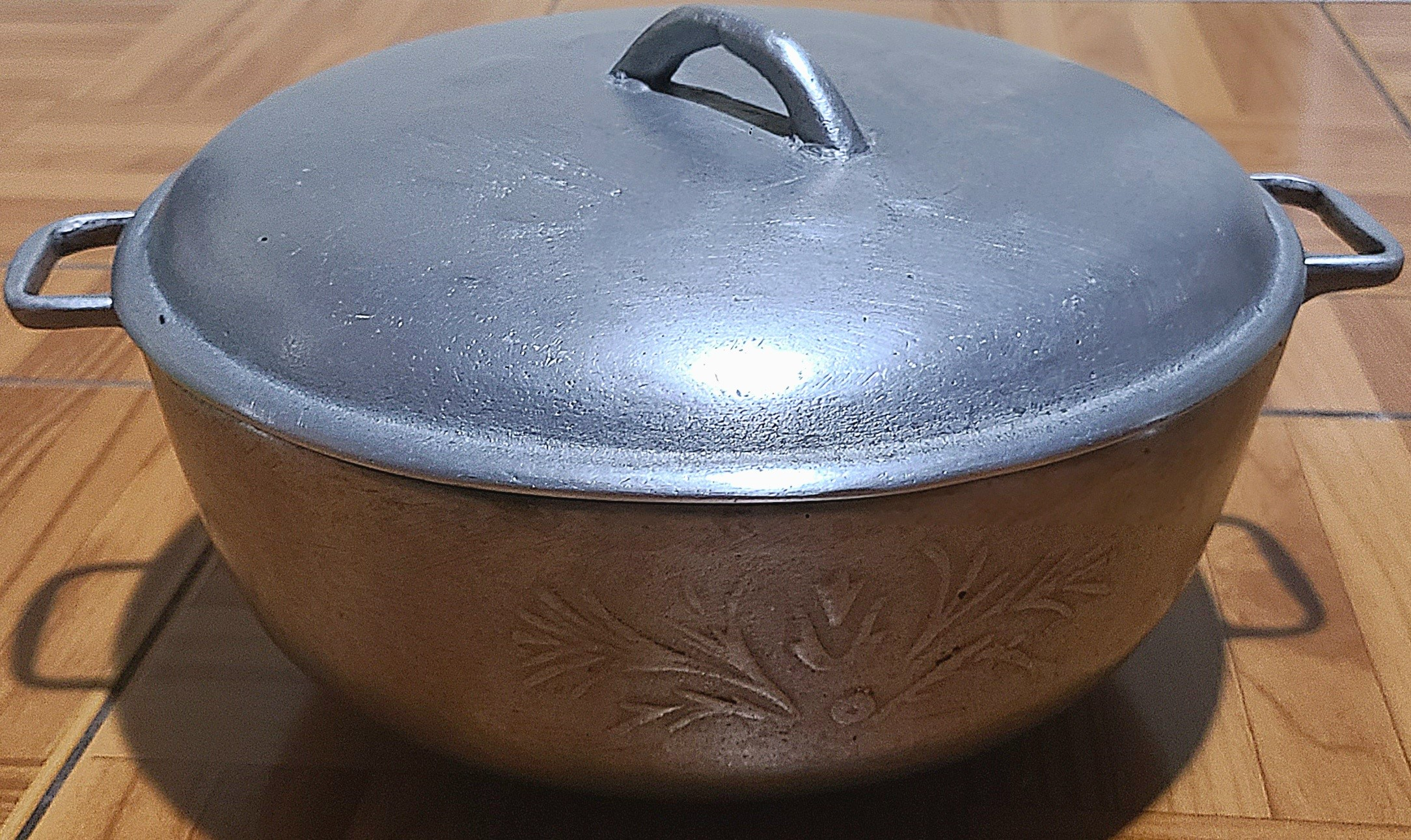
Jamaican Dutch pot used to cook brown stew, curry and fried dishes.

During the 17th century, Dutch traders settled in Jamaica and they brought sugarcane from Brazil. Also, before and during the Holocaust, Dutch Jews and Polish Jews sought refuge on the island. Between the late 1700s and 20th century, German Jews, Jews from Curacao, Brazil, British Guiana and Suriname also settled in Jamaica. As such, influences from other Europeans can be found in Jamaican cuisine. Jamaica's must-have cooking tool, the Dutch pot or Dutchie, was imported from the Netherlands by Dutch traders. It is typically used to cook meat, stew, and pot roast dishes, as well as, to bake bammies and puddings. The coal stove, another important cooking tool used for preparing a wide range of foods like roast breadfruit (especially outdoors), was introduced by Dutch traders during the colonial era. German influence became especially notable through migrants who arrived in the 1960s. They introduced dishes such as pork and wiener schnitzel, along with other foods including knockwurst, German sausages, frankfurter, wiener, and smoked marlin. Other dishes which have been adopted with German and other European influences include Christmas ham, coleslaw, donuts, coconut rolls, cinnamon rolls, ginger biscuits, Black Forest cake, raisin bread and marble cakes.

==== Middle Eastern influences ====
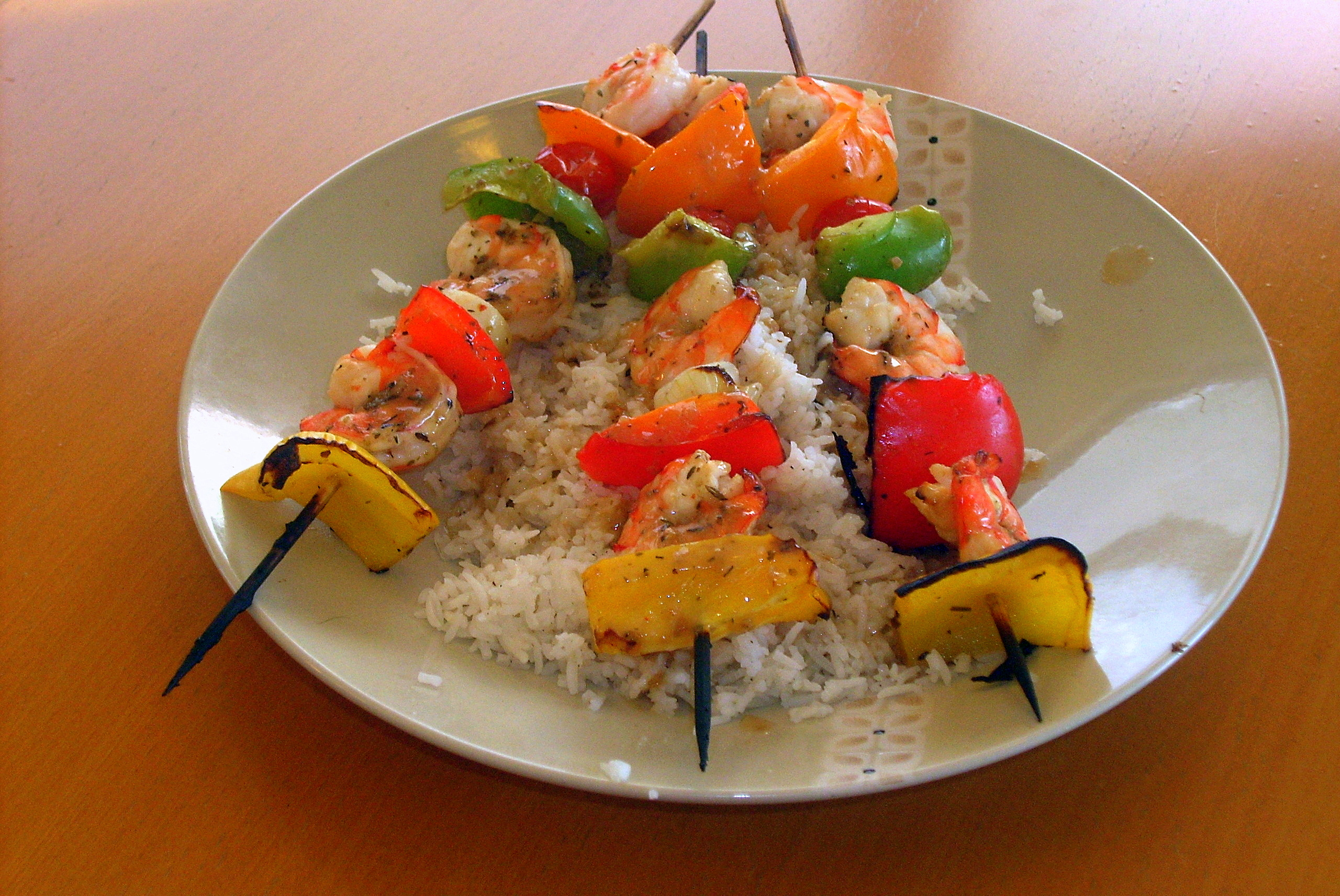
Shrimp kebab

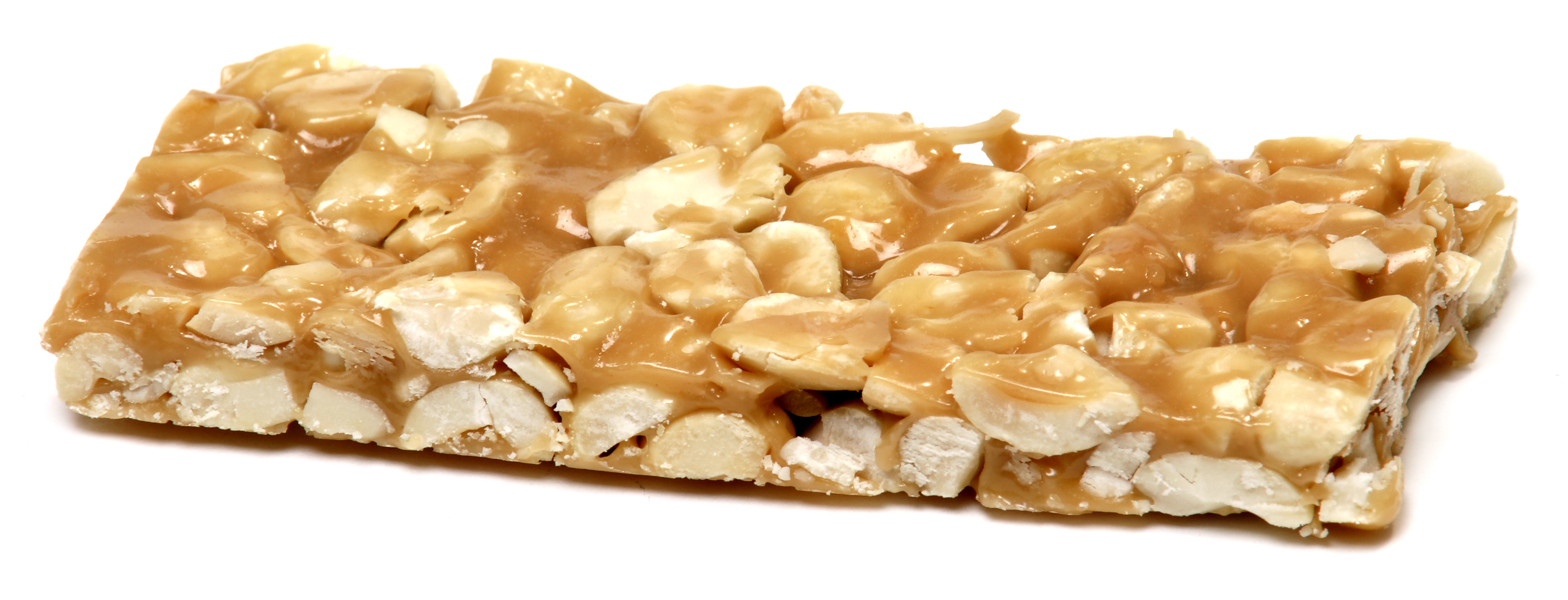
Peanut brittle

Middle Eastern contributions to Jamaica's culinary repertoire began when Syrian, Lebanese and Palestinian people, mostly Christians and some Jews, fled to Jamaica in the late 19th century, due to religious persecution under Ottoman rule. Jews from other places such as Egypt also settled on the island. Contingents of Syrian and Lebanese merchants settled in Jamaica and established businesses— as such, Middle Eastern, particularly Levantine influences can be found in some dishes. Variations of kebabs, wraps, meatballs, pelau, stuffed grape leaf rolls (known as 'mehshi') which are made with cabbage as a substitute, hummus, baba ghanoush, kibbeh, laban, tabbouleh and Syrian bread have been adopted. Though some of these dishes are not widely prepared by all locals, their influences can be seen in some fusion dishes, and Syrian, Lebanese and kosher restaurants can be found across the island. Jamaican peanut drops or cake and peanut brittle have Middle Eastern and other influences.

Simmering, a popular cooking style in Jewish cuisine is also used for Jamaican stews, and the use of garlic as a primary seasoning is a culinary tradition inherited from the Jews. Local variations of kosher food with a Jamaican twist can be found in Jamaica, and some kosher dishes have been modified by Rastafarians to create ital dishes.

== Jamaican Rastafari cuisine ==
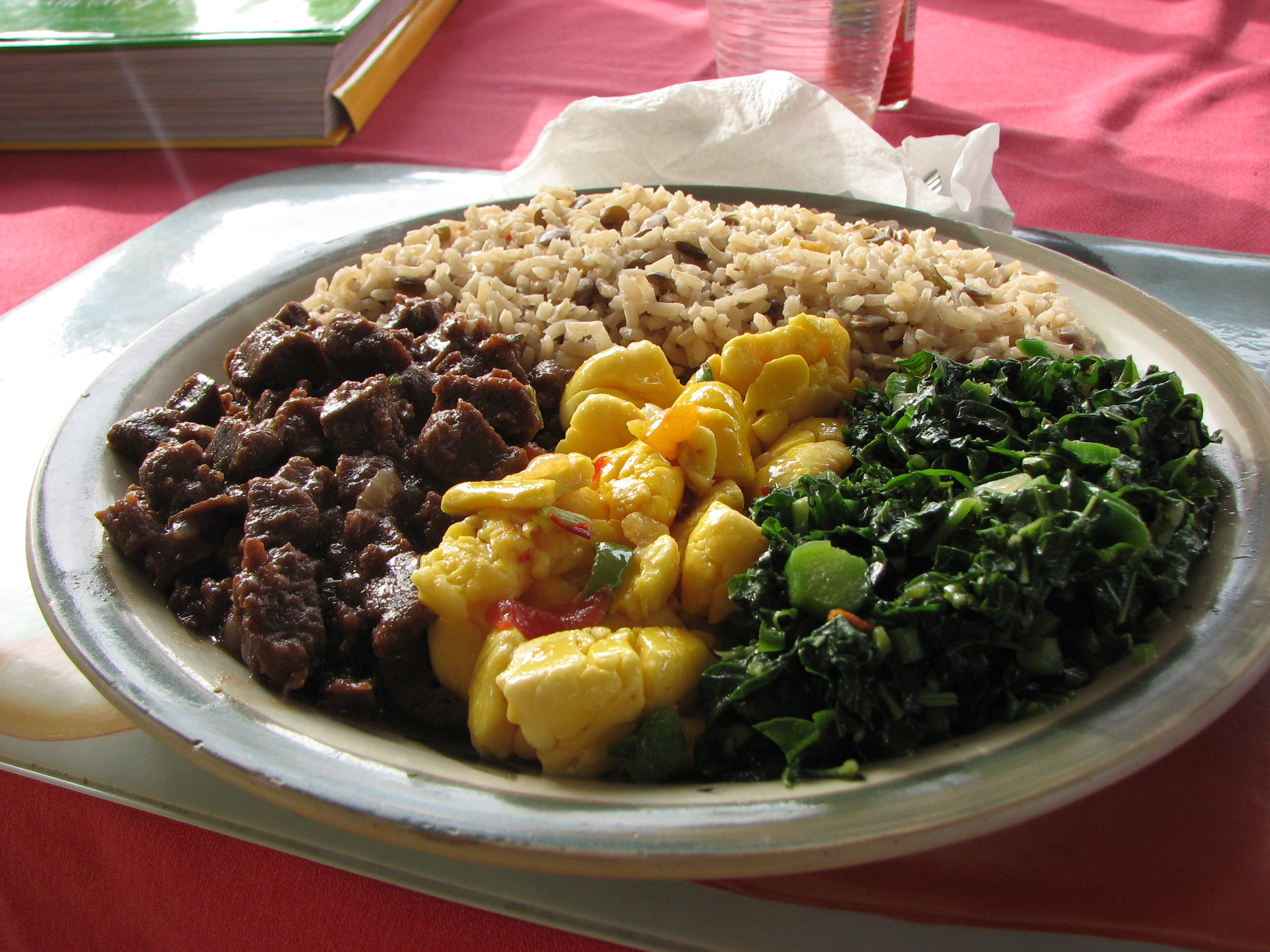
Ital meal—ackee, callaloo, rice and peas, and veggie chunks

Jamaican Rastafari have a holistic vegan approach to preparing food, cooking, and eating, and they have introduced a host of unique vegetarian dishes to Jamaican cuisine. Rastafari dishes are referred to as ital, meaning "natural", derived from the English word "vital". Their diet is based on maintaining a balanced life, good health and longevity by consuming fresh, organic and locally sourced ingredients. Popular ital foods include ackee, lentil, tofu, okra and bean and pea dishes, pumpkin rice, callaloo and other vegetables. Some Rastas adhere to a pescatarian diet, and have adopted kosher dishes. Modern Rastas are blending global plant-based trends with ital roots, creating new fusion dishes such as jerk hummus.

== Popular dishes ==
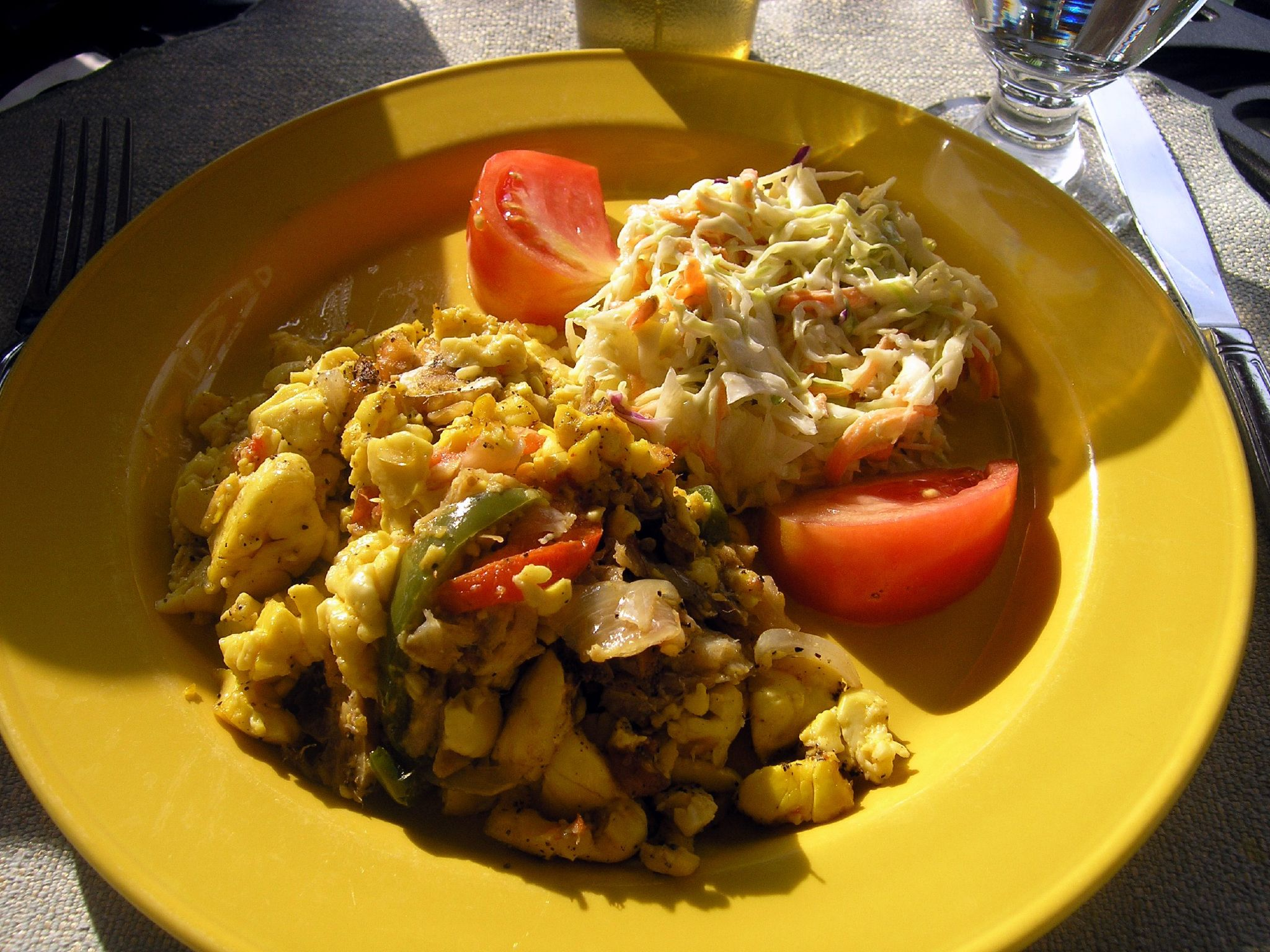
Ackee and saltfish— Jamaica's national dish

A typical Jamaican breakfast may include ackee and saltfish, seasoned callaloo, boiled green bananas, and fried dumplings.

=== Meat and seafood dishes ===
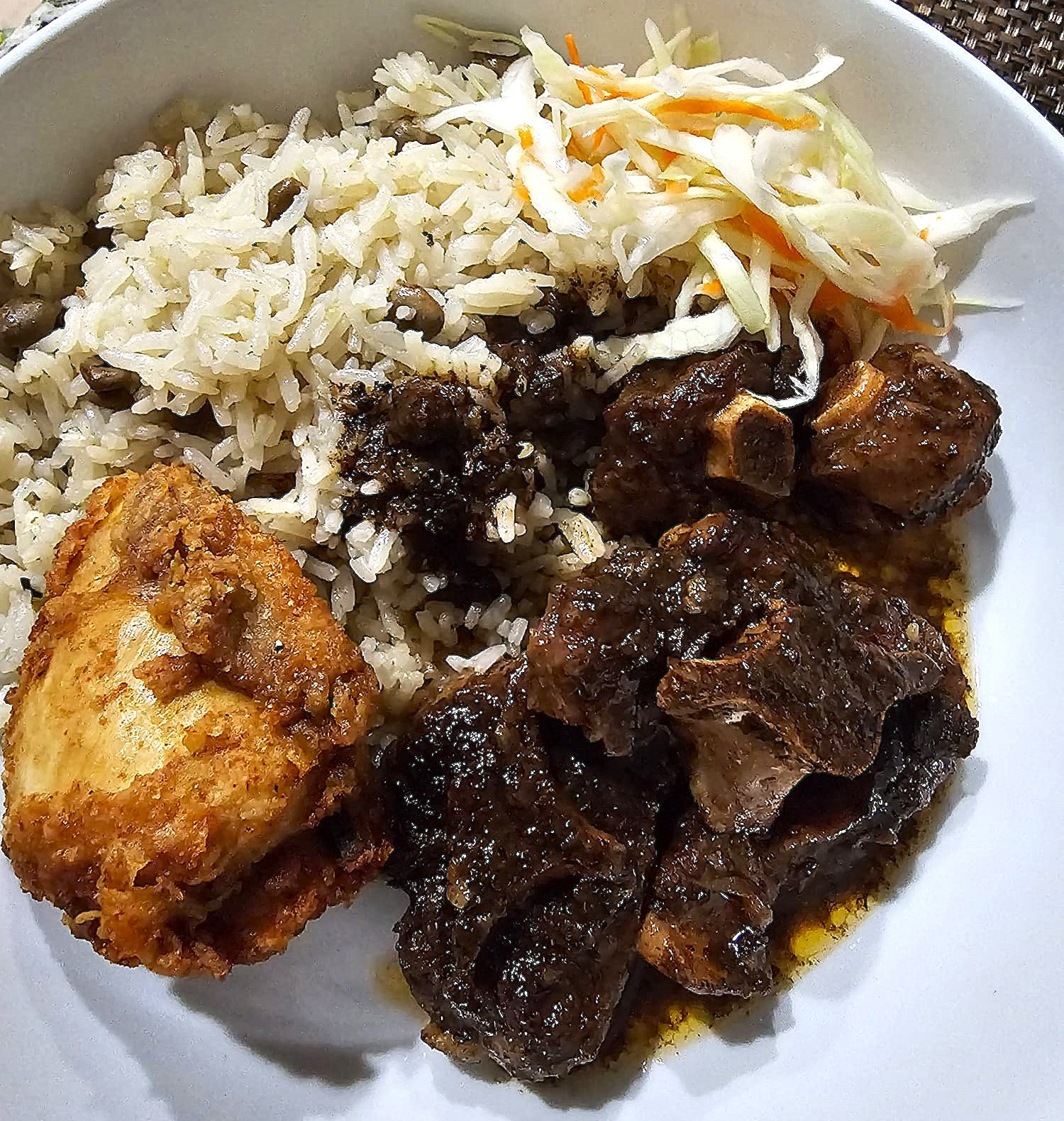
Fried chicken and oxtail, with a side of rice and peas (with gungo) and coleslaw.

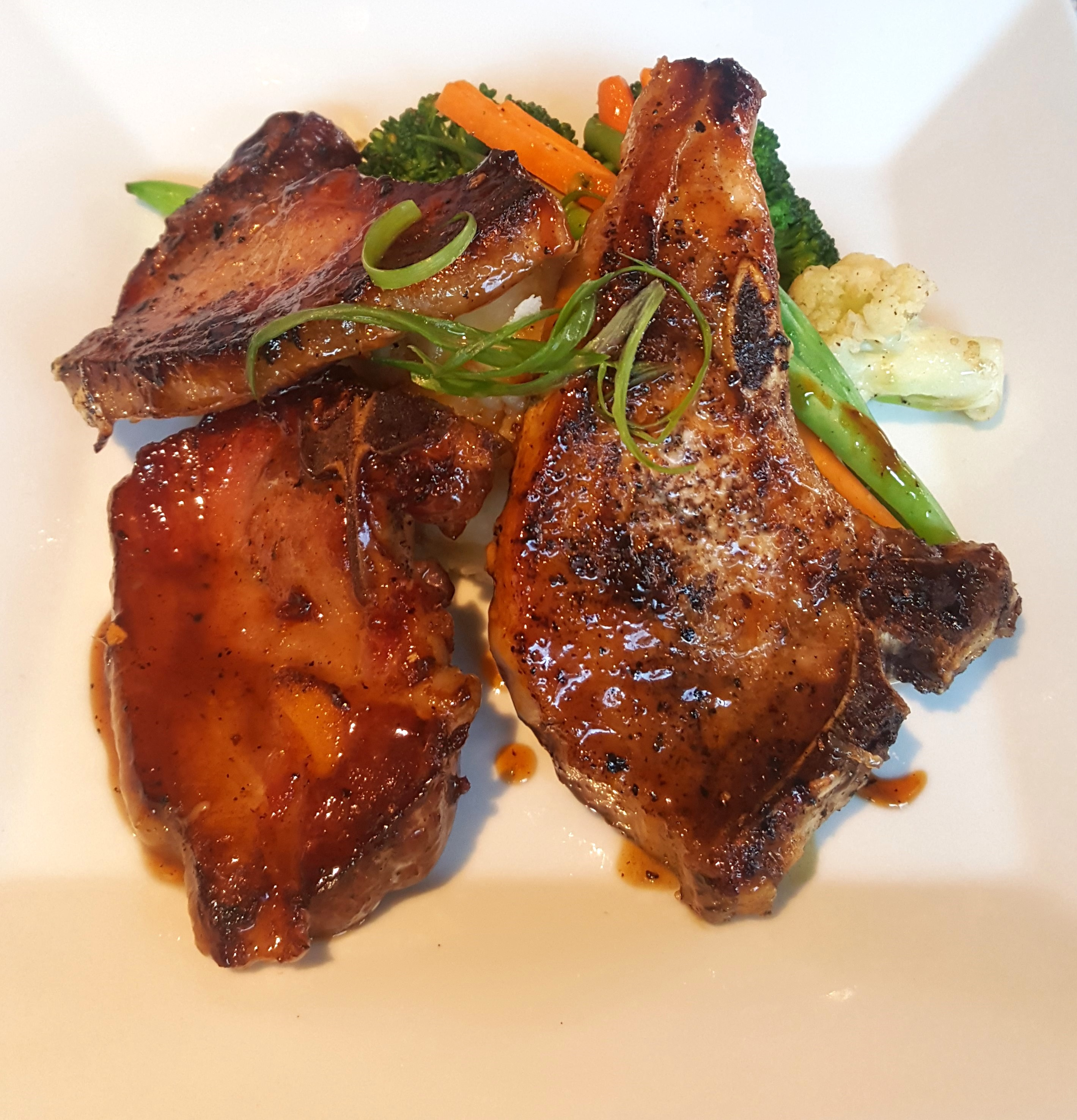
Honey barbecue pork chops with stir-fry vegetables.

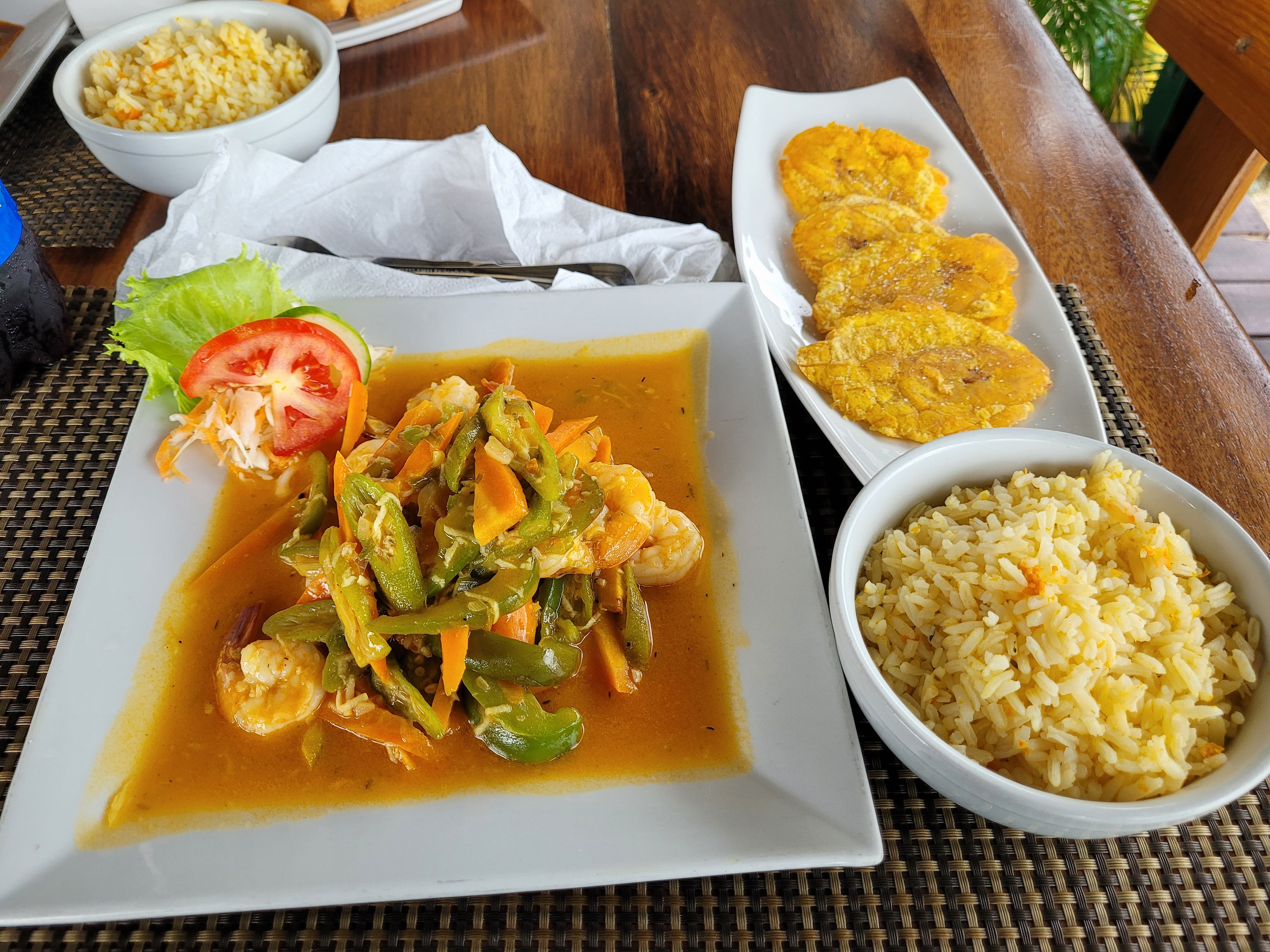
Garlic shrimp with okra and carrot, served with pumpkin rice and tostones.

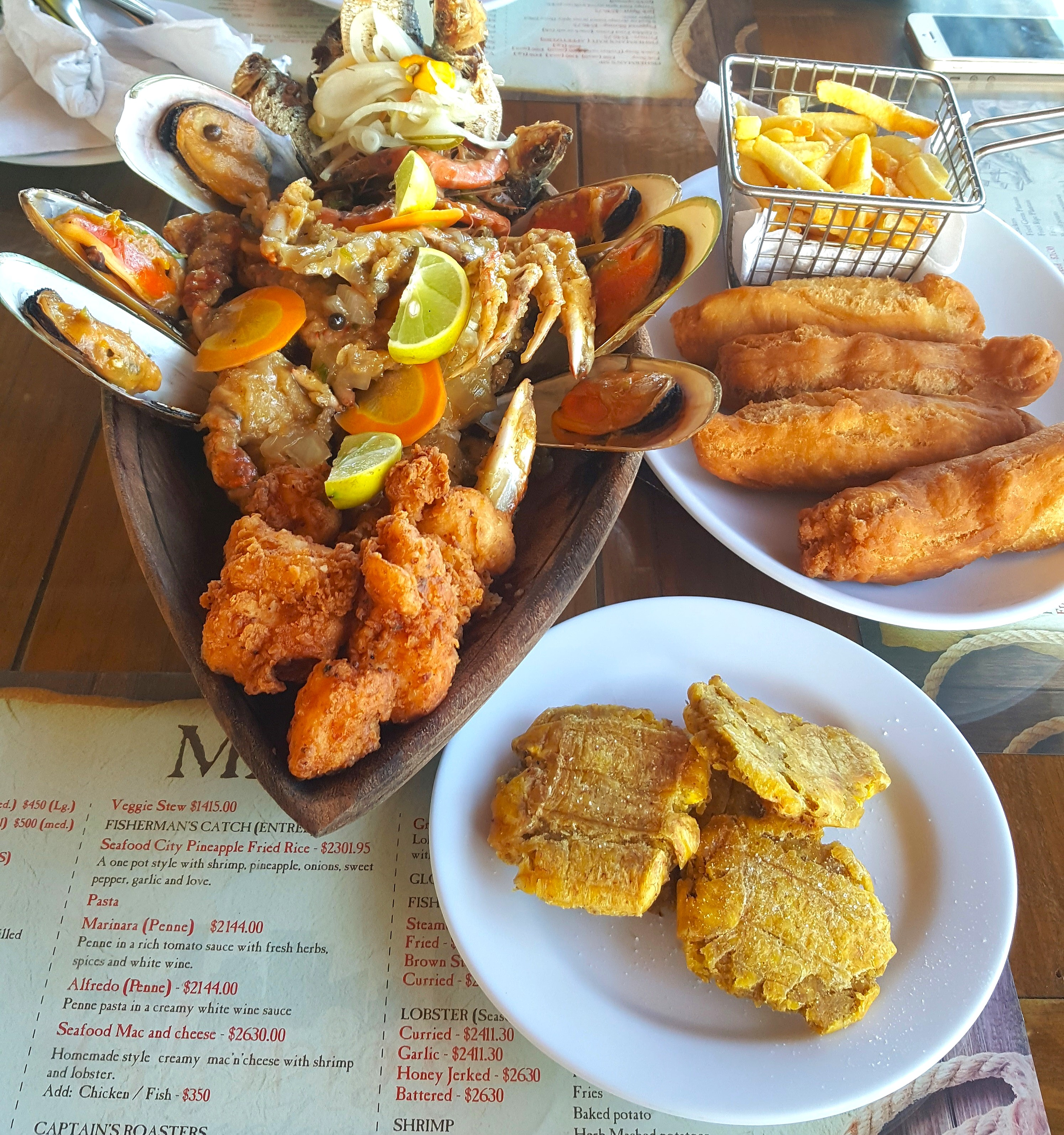
Jamaican seafood platter—fried lobster, shrimp, crab and fish with mussels, fries, festivals and tostones.

- Baked chicken
- Barbecue meats (chicken, wings, pork, beef etc.)
- Barbie-fry chicken
- Boiled crab
- Brown stew (beef, chicken, fish, goat, mutton, pork, oxtail and turkey neck etc.)
- Chop suey (chicken, shrimp, beef and pork)
- Coconut curry (shrimp, fish, lobster and chicken)
- Conch (stewed, roasted, jerked and curried)
- Corned pork or beef
- Cow foot stew
- Curried meats and seafood (chicken, goat, mutton, shrimp, lobster, fish, crab, beef, pork and oxtail)
- Escoveitch fish (and other seafood)
- Fricassee chicken
- Fried chicken
- Fried fish and seafood (shrimp in batter and lobster)
- Garlic chicken and seafood (shrimp, fish, lobster and conch)
- Grilled meats and seafood (chicken, steak, fish and lobster etc.)
- Jerked meats and seafood (chicken, pork, fish, conch, shrimp, lobster and sausage etc.)
- Liver (typically brown stew chicken or cow's liver)
- Lobster thermidor
- Mala chicken
- Meatballs
- Minced meat (chicken or beef)
- Pan chicken
- Peppered shrimp
- Pepper steak
- Pineapple chicken
- Pot-roast (chicken, beef, pork and mutton etc.)
- Roasted meats and seafood (chicken, ham, beef, pork, fish etc.)
- Rundown
- Saltfish (sautéed or roasted)
- Salt mackerel (sautéed)
- Stir-fry (chicken and shrimp)
- Steamed fish with okra and carrot
- Stew peas
- Sweet and sour (chicken, pork and shrimp)
- Tripe and bean

=== Soups ===
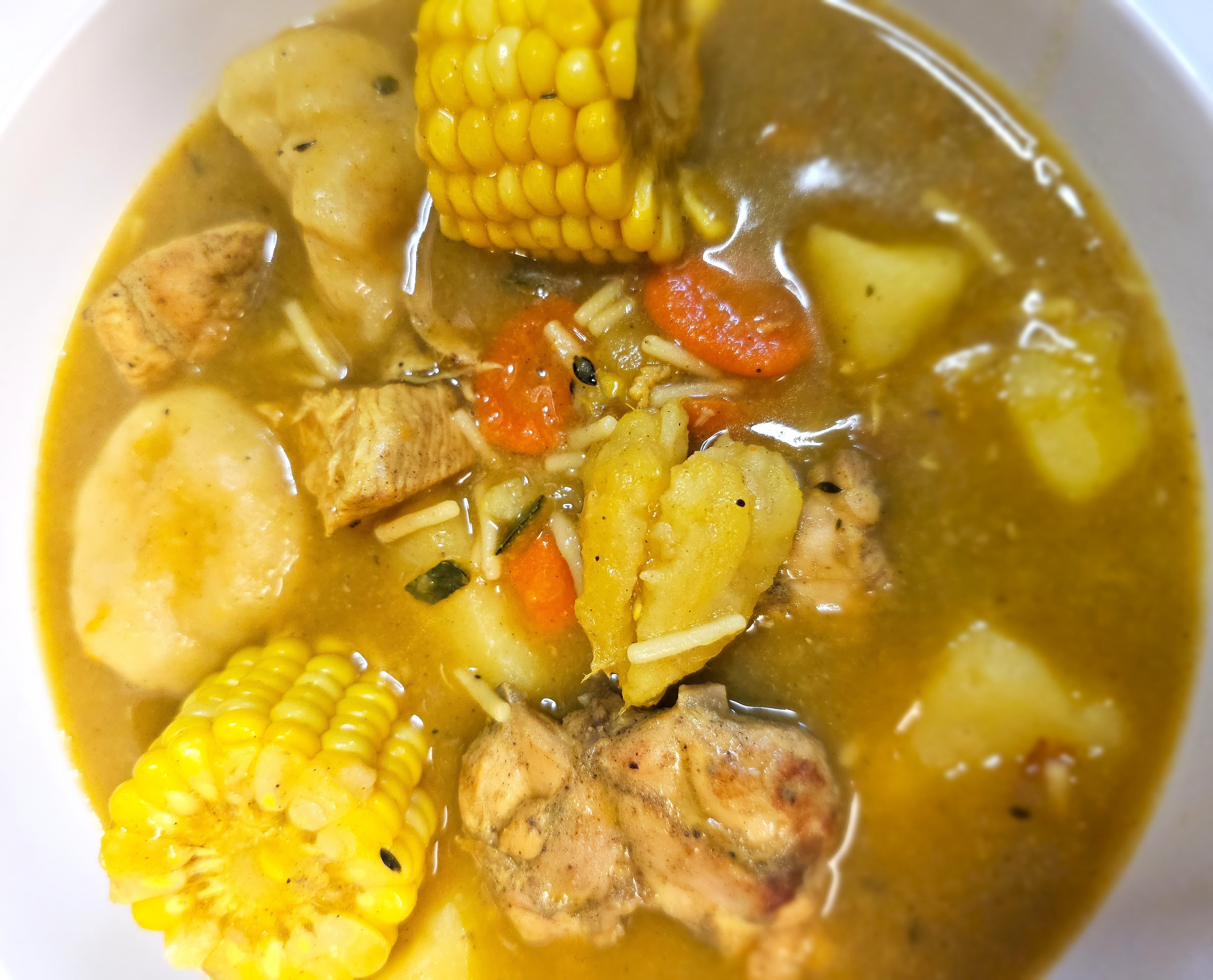
Chicken soup

- Beef soup (also Saturday soup)
- Busso (river snail) soup
- Chicken foot soup
- Chicken soup
- Conch soup
- Corn soup
- Cow skin soup
- Fish tea
- Gungo peas soup
- Janga (crayfish) soup
- Mannish water
- Mutton soup
- Pepperpot
- Pumpkin soup
- Red peas soup

=== Side dishes ===
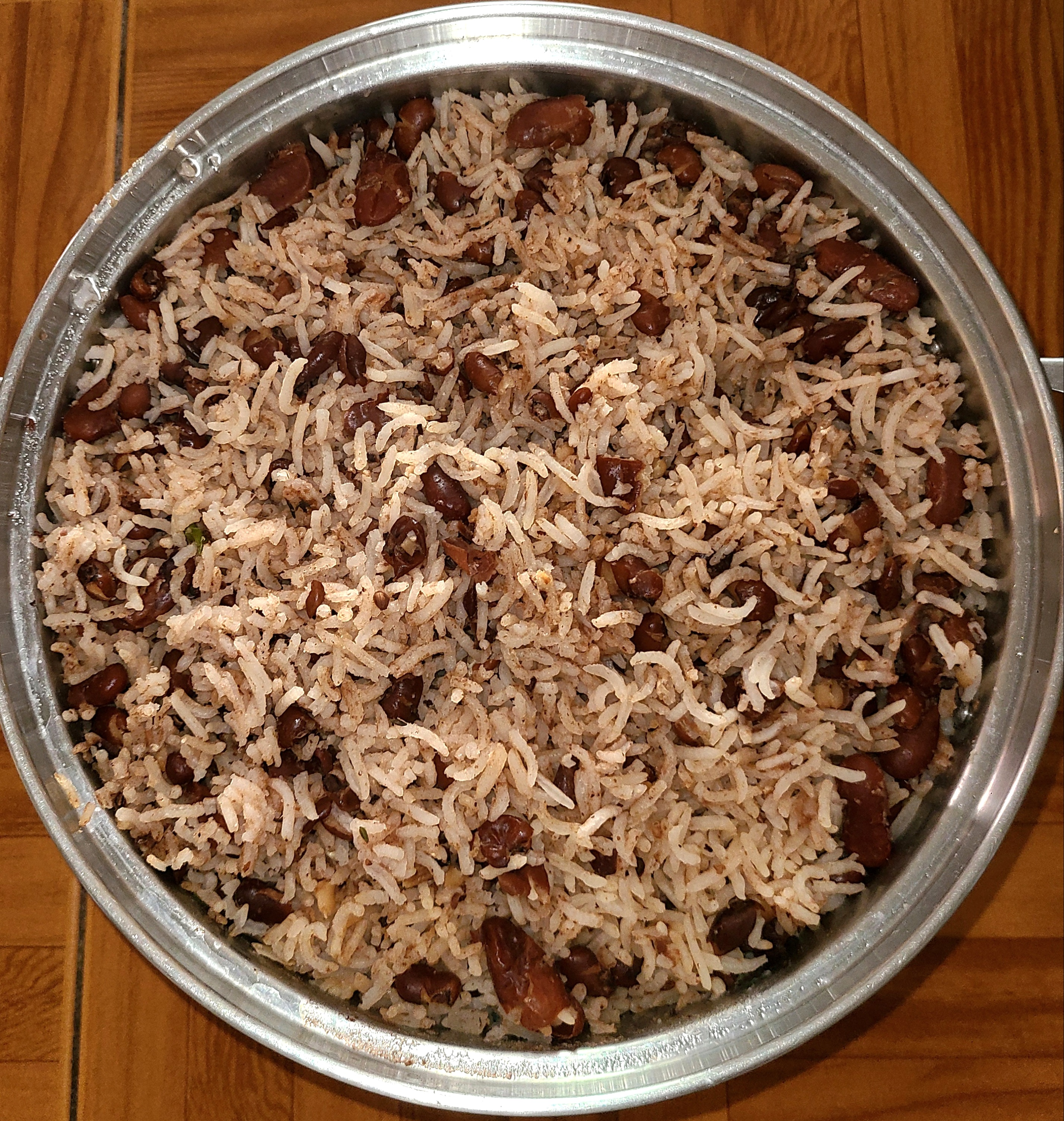
Rice and peas

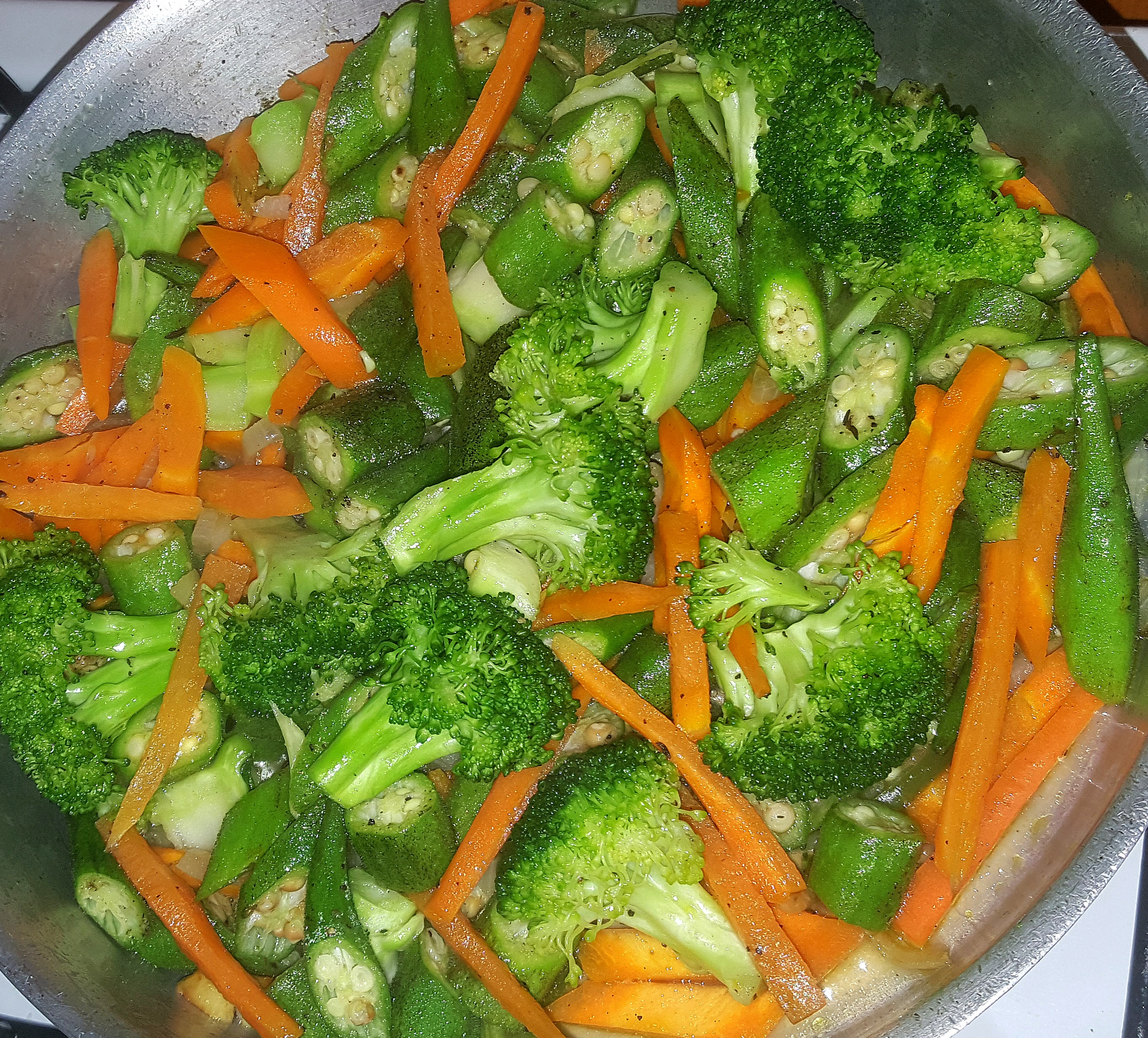
Stir-fry vegetables

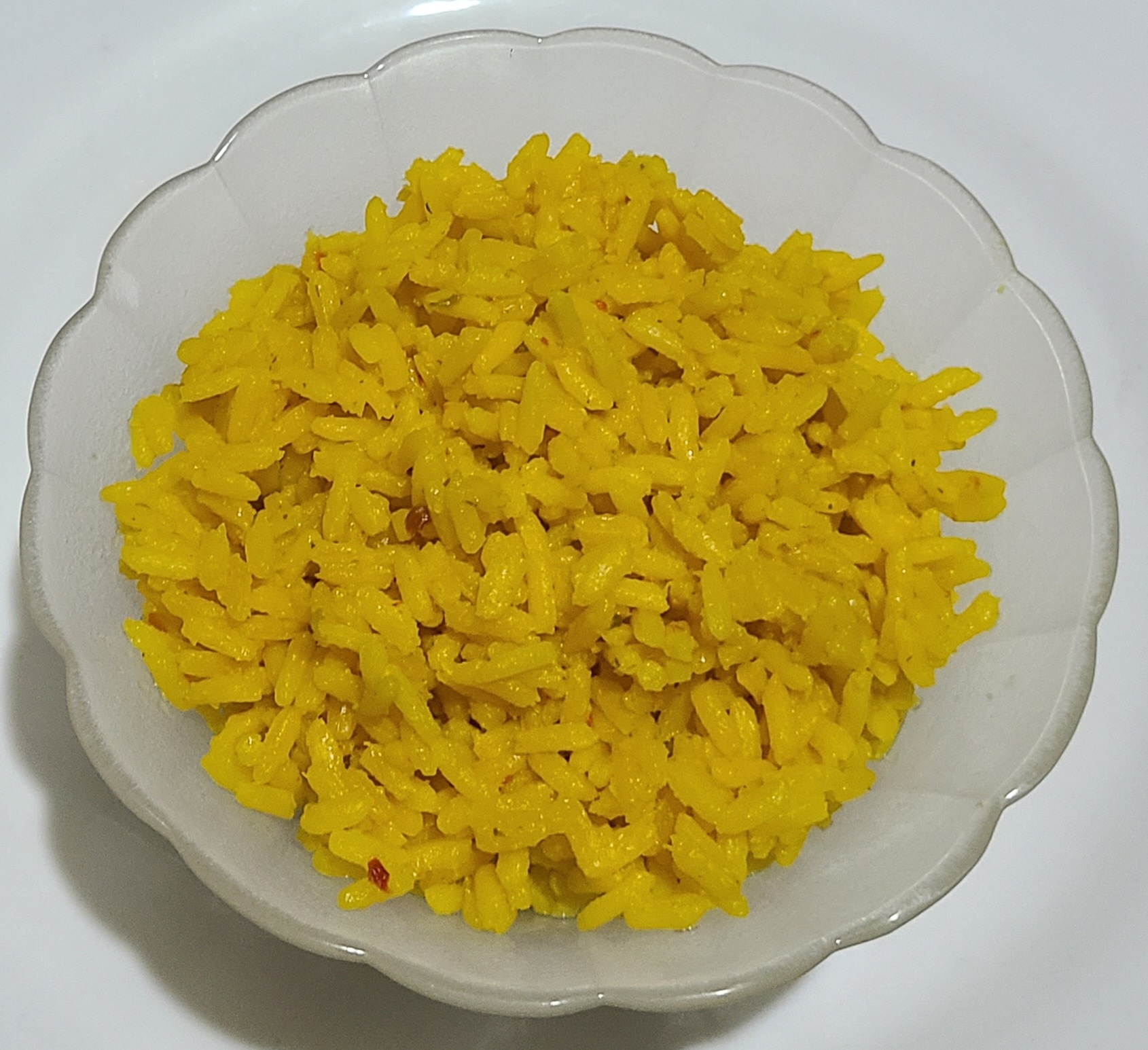
Jamaican Spanish rice

- Boiled plantain
- Bok choy
- Breadfruit (boiled, fried or roasted)
- Callaloo
- Callaloo rice
- Coconut rice
- Cooked rice
- Dumplings (boiled or fried)
- Festival
- Bammy (fried or steamed)
- Fried plantain
- Pressed green plantain
- Fried rice
- Green banana
- Ground provisions (boiled or roasted)
- Macaroni and cheese
- Potato (boiled, fried, mashed, roasted or baked)
- Potato salad
- Pumpkin rice
- Rice and peas
- Roti (Paratha and Dhalpuri)
- Spanish rice
- Seasoned rice (containing saltfish and spices).
- Shredded cabbage and carrot (coleslaw)
- Stir-fry or steamed vegetables
- Turned cornmeal

=== Breads and pastries ===
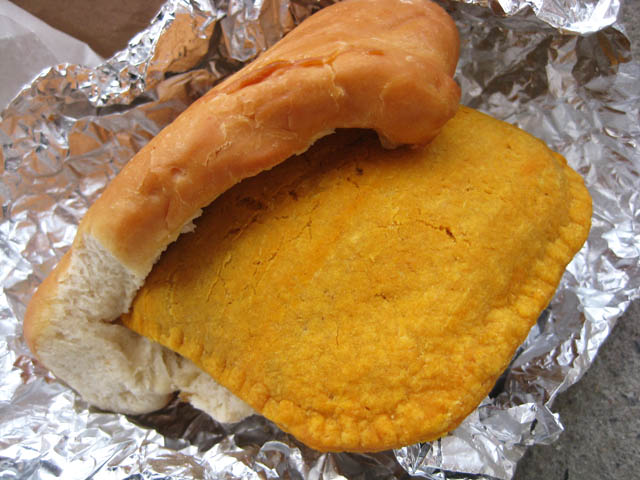
Jamaican patty wrapped in coco bread

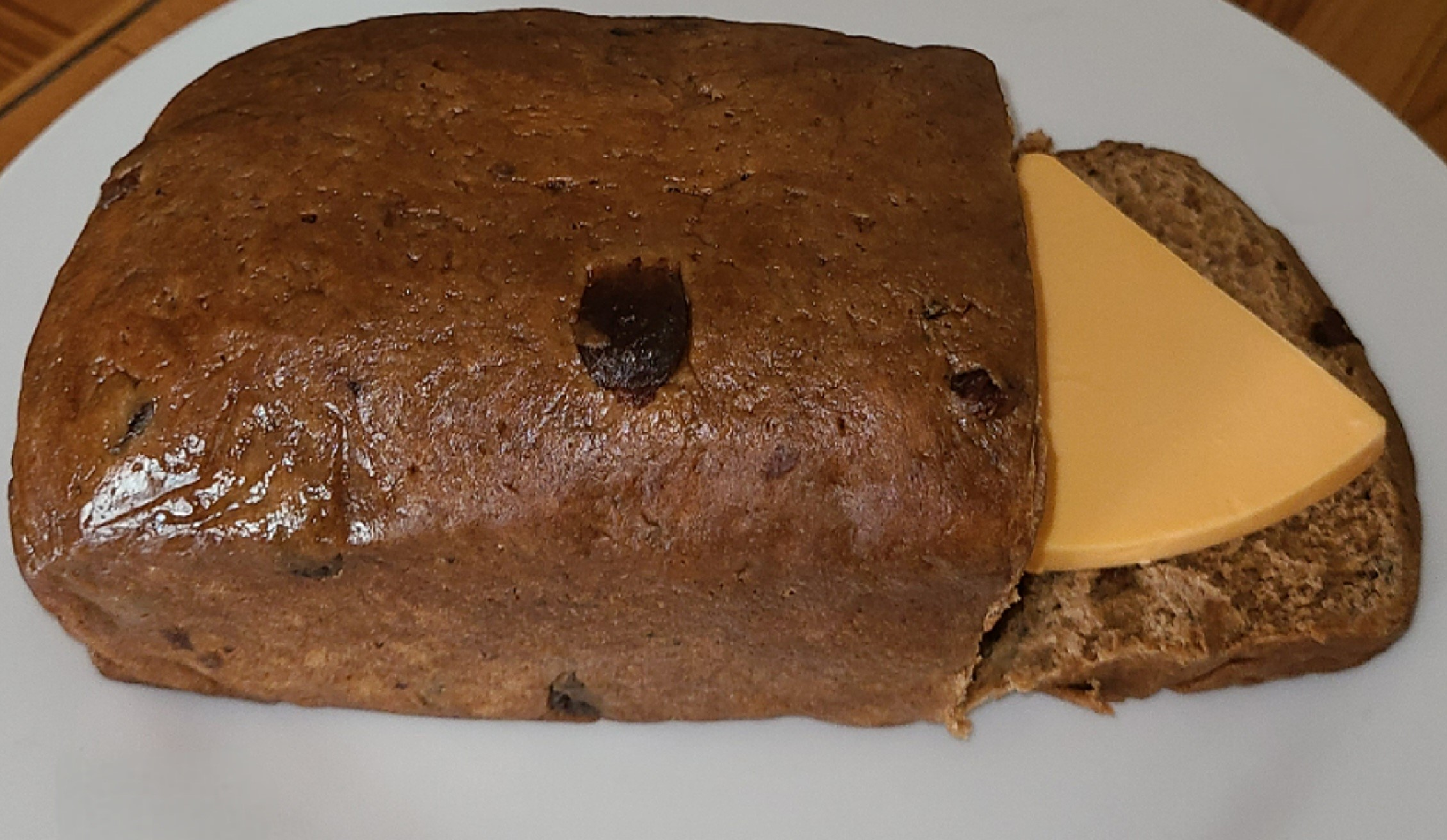
Jamaican bun and cheese

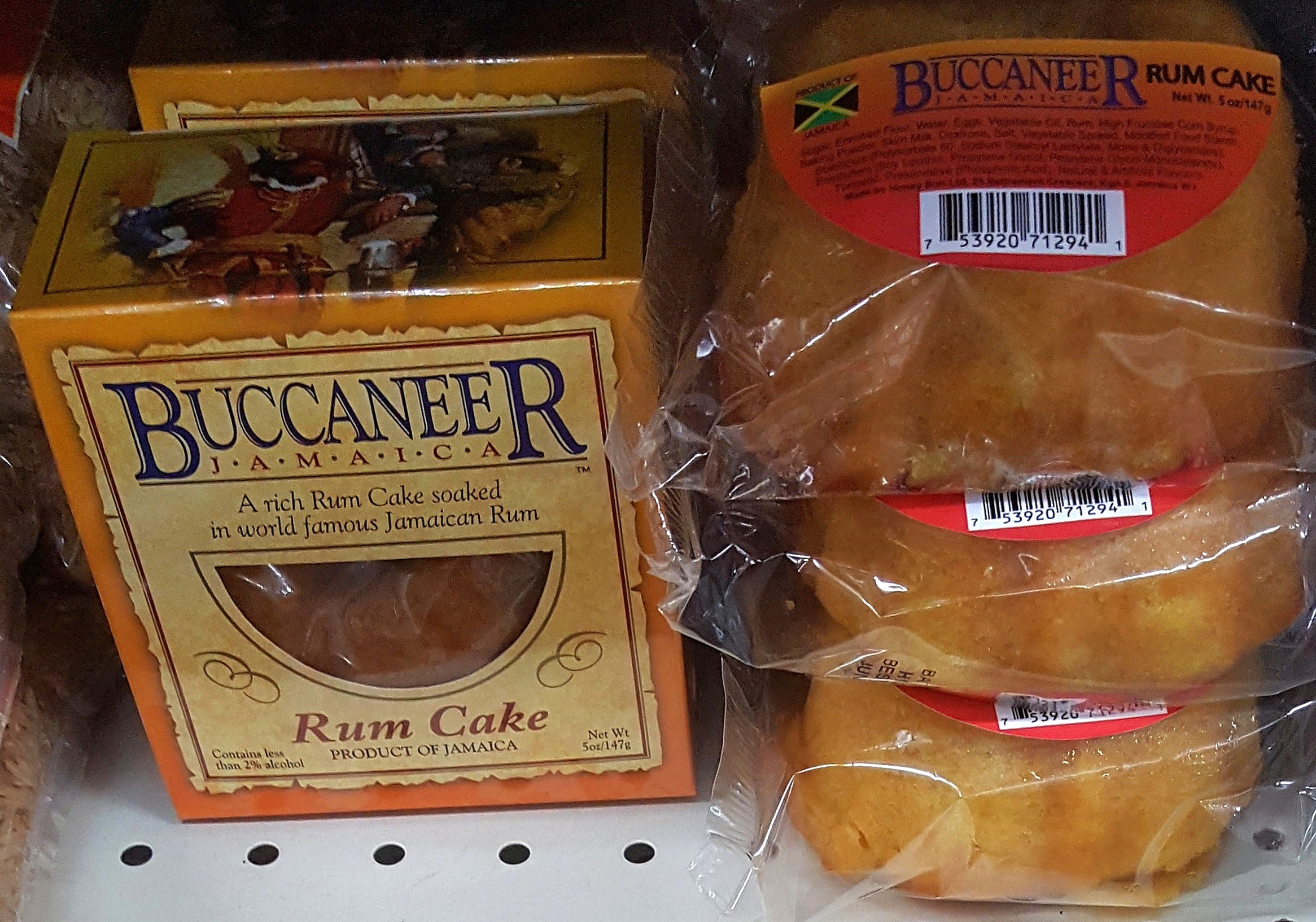
Jamaican rum cakes

- Bammy
- Banana loaf
- Bread pudding
- Black cake
- Bulla cake
- Carrot cake
- Cheese bread
- Cinnamon roll and loaf
- Coco bread
- Coconut bread
- Coconut roll
- Corn bread (a smooth, sweet, yellow roll)
- Donut (including twist donut)
- Grotto bread
- Hard dough bread
- Hummingbird cake
- Jamaican patty
- Madeira cake
- Marble cake and sponge cake
- Peg bread
- Raisin bread
- Rock cake
- Rum cake
- Spiced bun
- Sugar bun (similar to cinnamon roll)

== Beverages ==
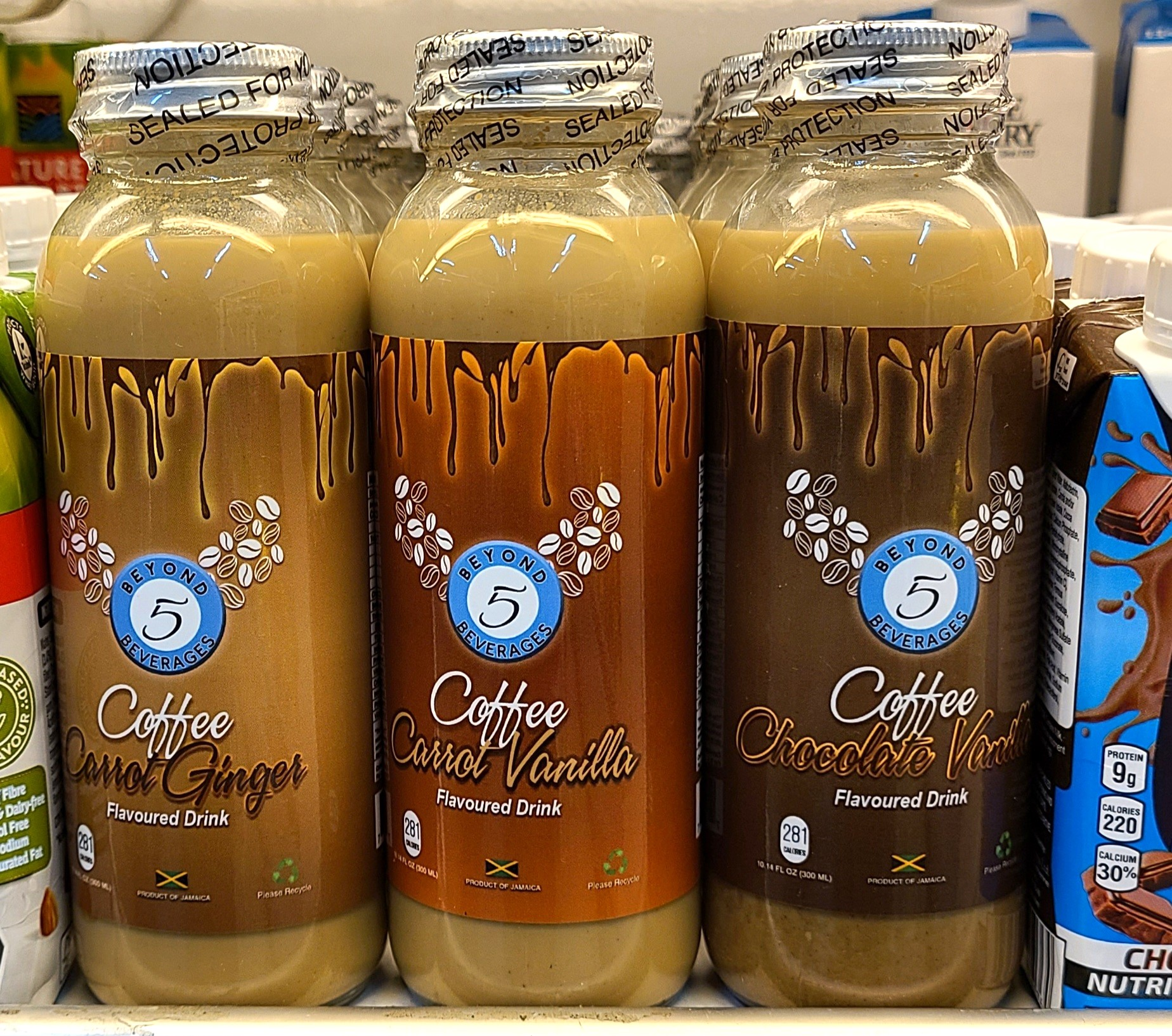
Jamaica's first cold brew Blue Mountain coffee drinks, in traditional flavours— carrot ginger, chocolate vanilla and carrot vanilla.

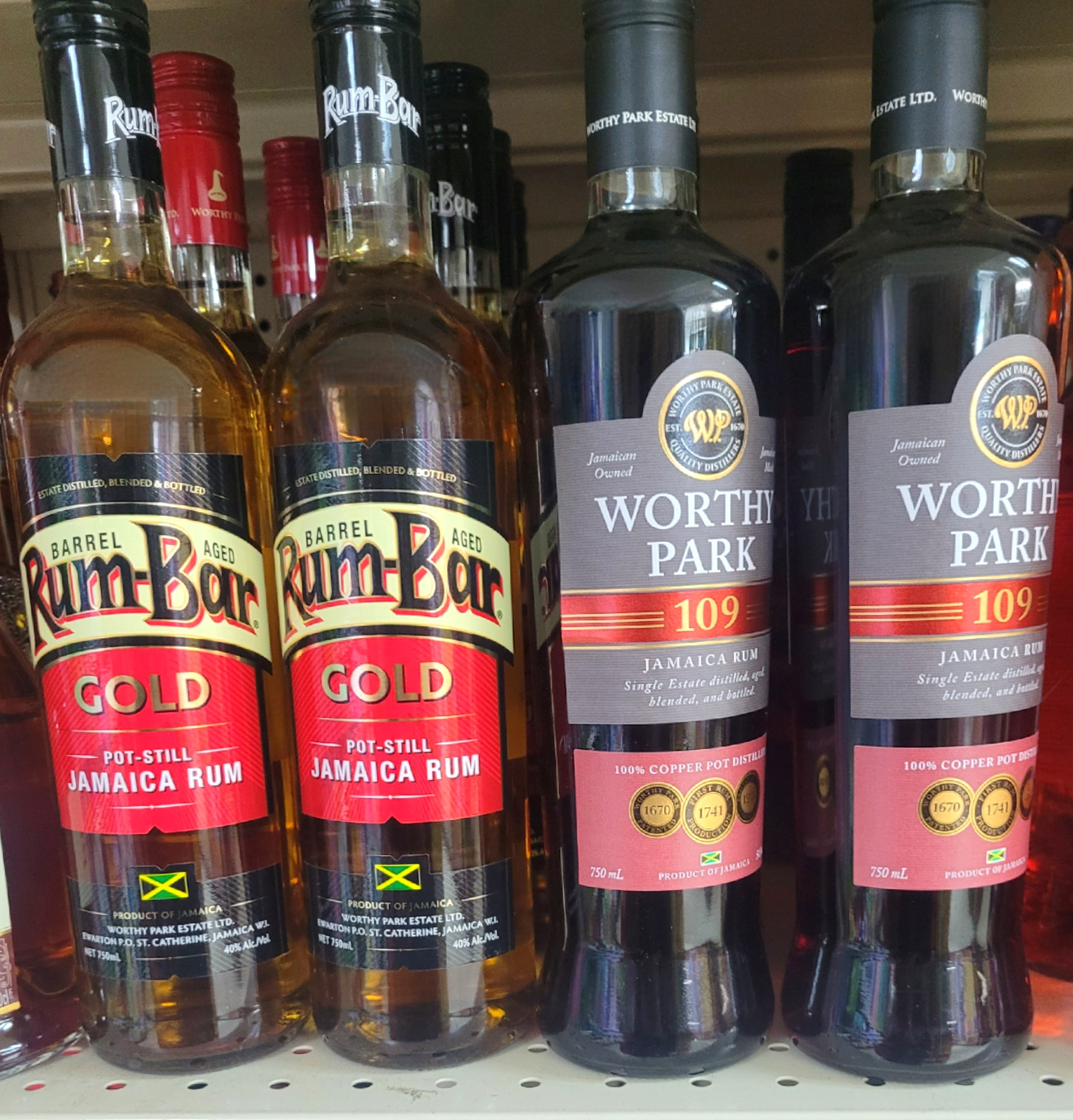
Rum from Jamaica's oldest rum distillery— rum was first produced at Worthy Park Estate in 1741.

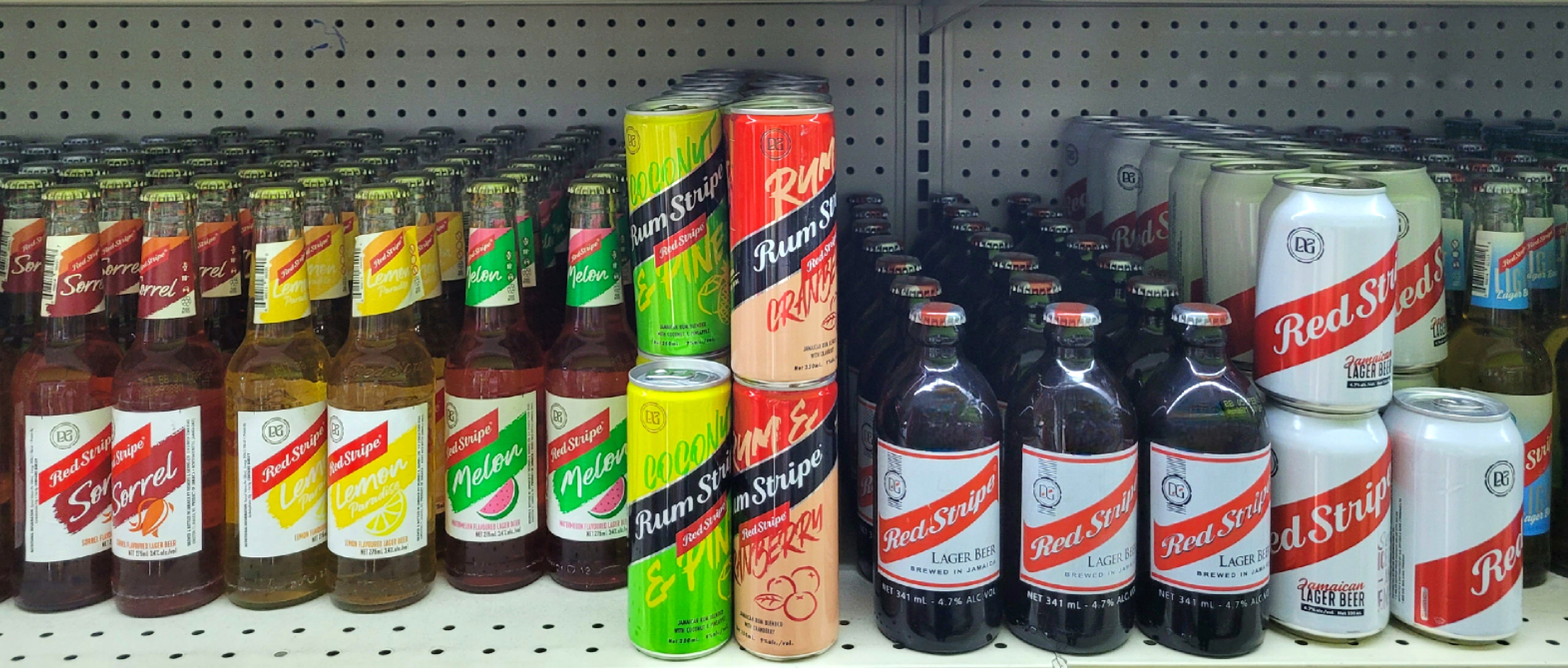
Red Stripe beers and cocktails in various flavours—such as sorrel, lemon, coconut pineapple, etc.

- Bigga and D&G sodas
- Box juices
- Bush/herbal teas
- Carrot juice with spices such as nutmeg and vanilla
- Cherry malt
- Chocolate tea
- Chocolate milk
- Coconut water
- Cocktails
- Coffee drinks
- Cream soda
- D&G Malta
- Eggnog
- Fruit juices (june plum, guava, mango, otaheite apple, pawpaw, pineapple, soursop, cherry, ribena, starfruit, jimbilin etc.)
- Ginger beer
- Guinness punch with spices such as nutmeg and vanilla
- Irish moss
- Jamaica Blue Mountain coffee
- Kola Champagne
- Lasco Jamaica food drinks
- Limeade
- Liqueurs (Sangster's, Tia Maria, etc.)
- Mauby
- Peanut punch
- Pimento dram
- Red Label wine
- Red Stripe
- Rums
- Rum creams (including flavours like coffee, chocolate, rum & raisin, coconut and banana)
- Sorrel
- Supligen
- Tamarind Fizz
- Tia Maria
- Ting (grapefruit soda)

== Desserts and sweets ==
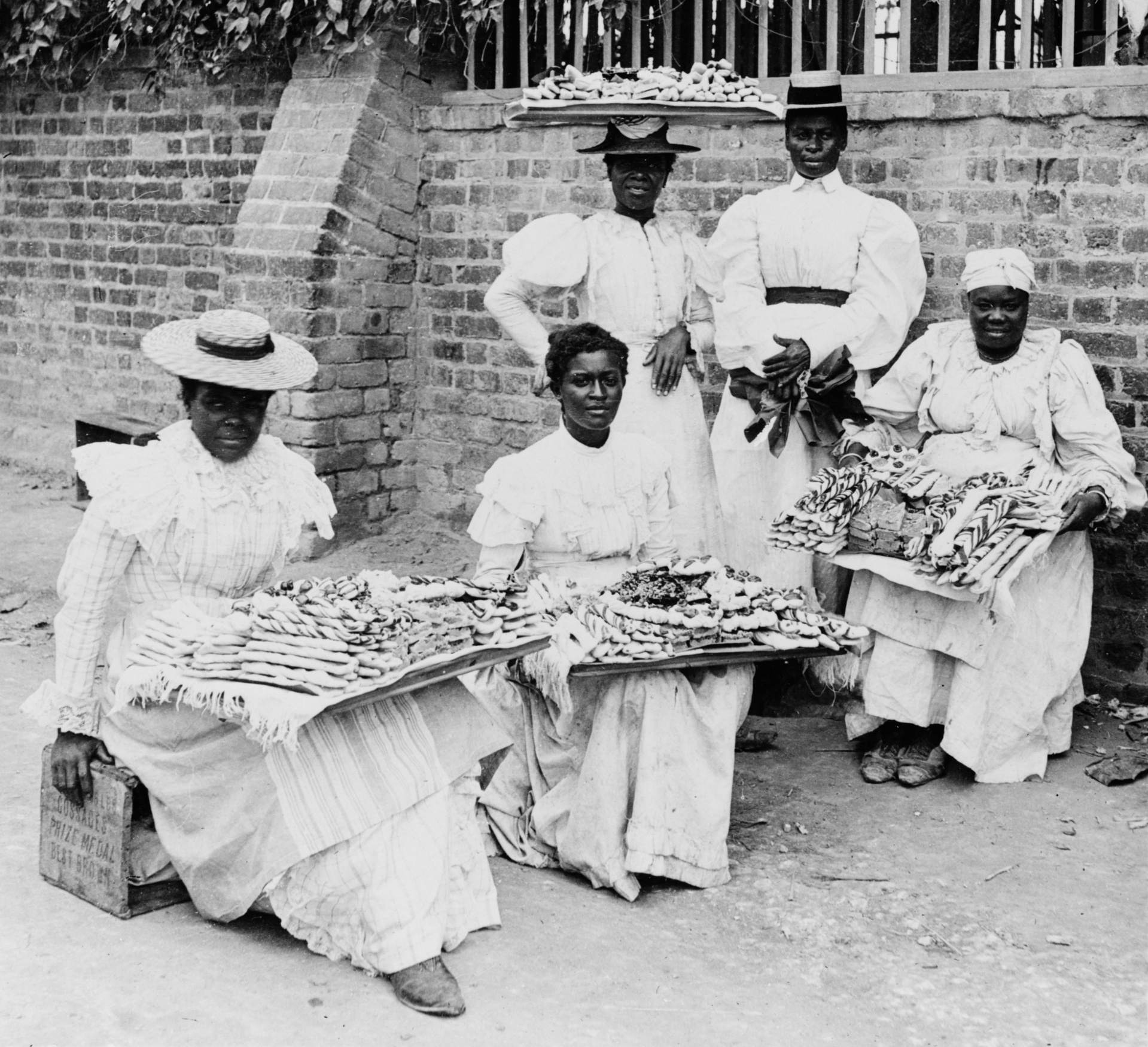
Women selling desserts in Kingston, Jamaica, c. 1899

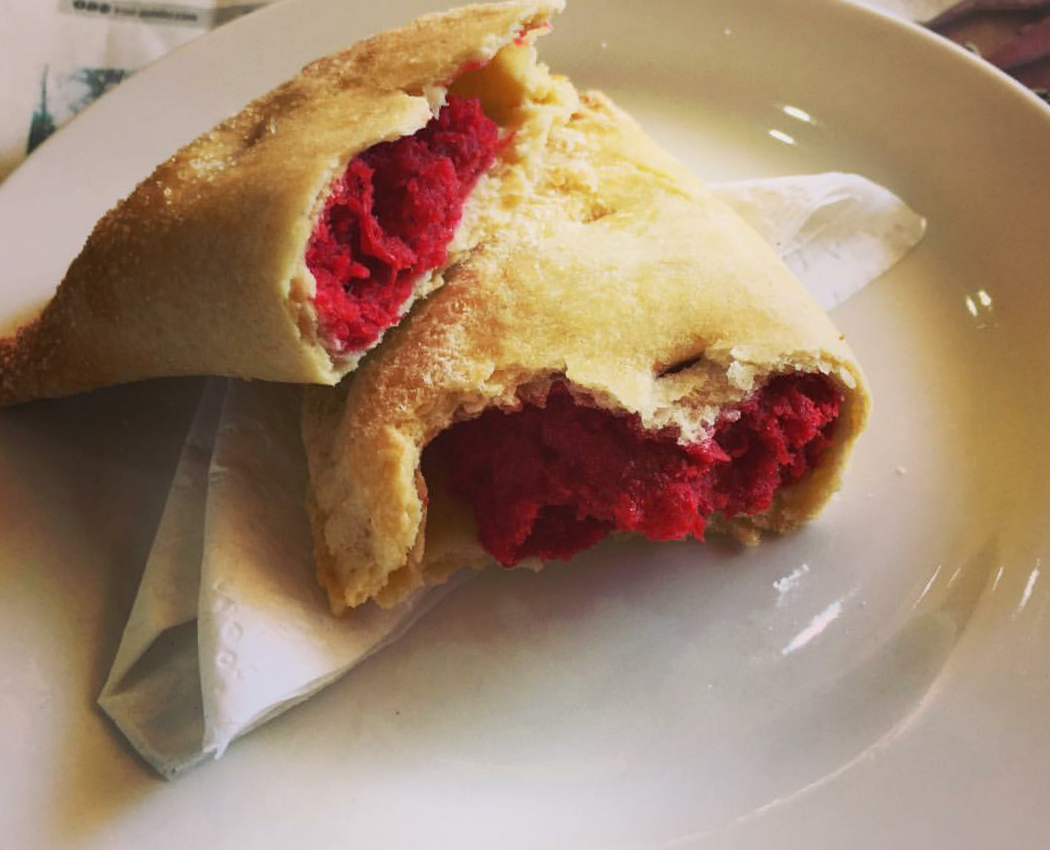
Plantain tart

Grapenut, rum and raisin ice cream are popular desserts. Jamaican ice cream comes in many flavours like, coffee, pistachio, jackfruit, coconut, mango, pineapple, guava, soursop and Dragon Stout.

Other popular desserts include batata pudding, cornmeal pudding, cassava pone, gizzada, grater cake, toto, banana fritters, coconut drops, plantain tarts, guava cheese, banana bread, rum cake, carrot cake, pineapple cake, fruit cake and coconut macaroons.

Tie-a-leaf or blue drawers is a dish made by combining a starch (usually cornmeal, cassava or sweet potato) with coconut milk, spices like cinnamon and nutmeg, sugar and vanilla, then wrapped and tied in banana leaf before boiling.

Asham is parched corn that is ground and combined with brown sugar.

Jackass corn is a sweet thin biscuit that is made from corn, and is hard to bite.

Tamarind balls are candy made with the sticky flesh of the fruit, rolled with brown sugar into sweet and sour balls. A spicy version containing hot pepper can be made.

Bustamante Backbone, also called Busta, stagga back or buss mi jaw, is a toffee-like candy named after Jamaica's first Prime Minister Alexander Bustamante. It is made with brown sugar, coconut, ginger and molasses, and can also include coffee, vanilla and lime juice.

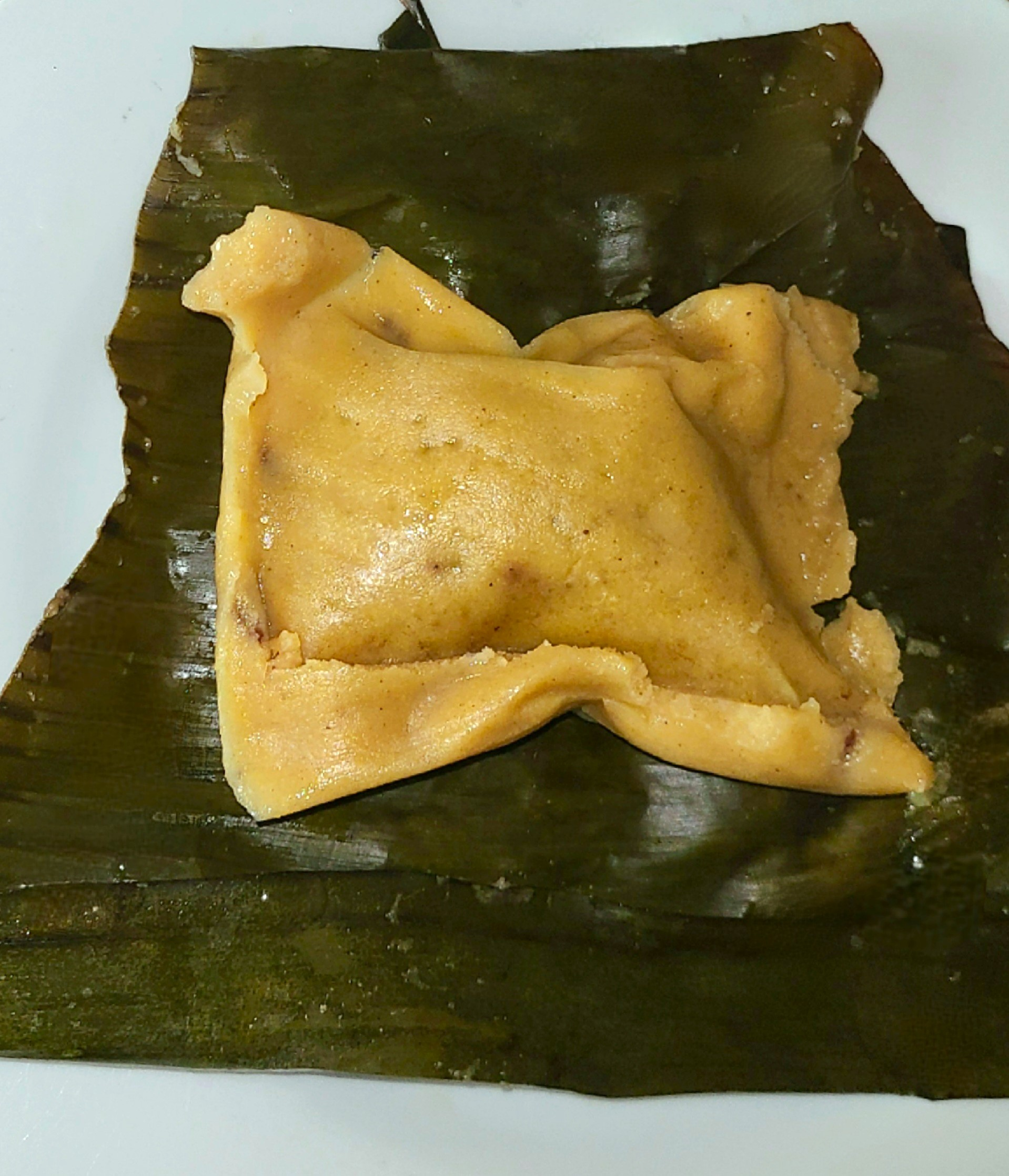
Blue drawers or tie-a-leaf

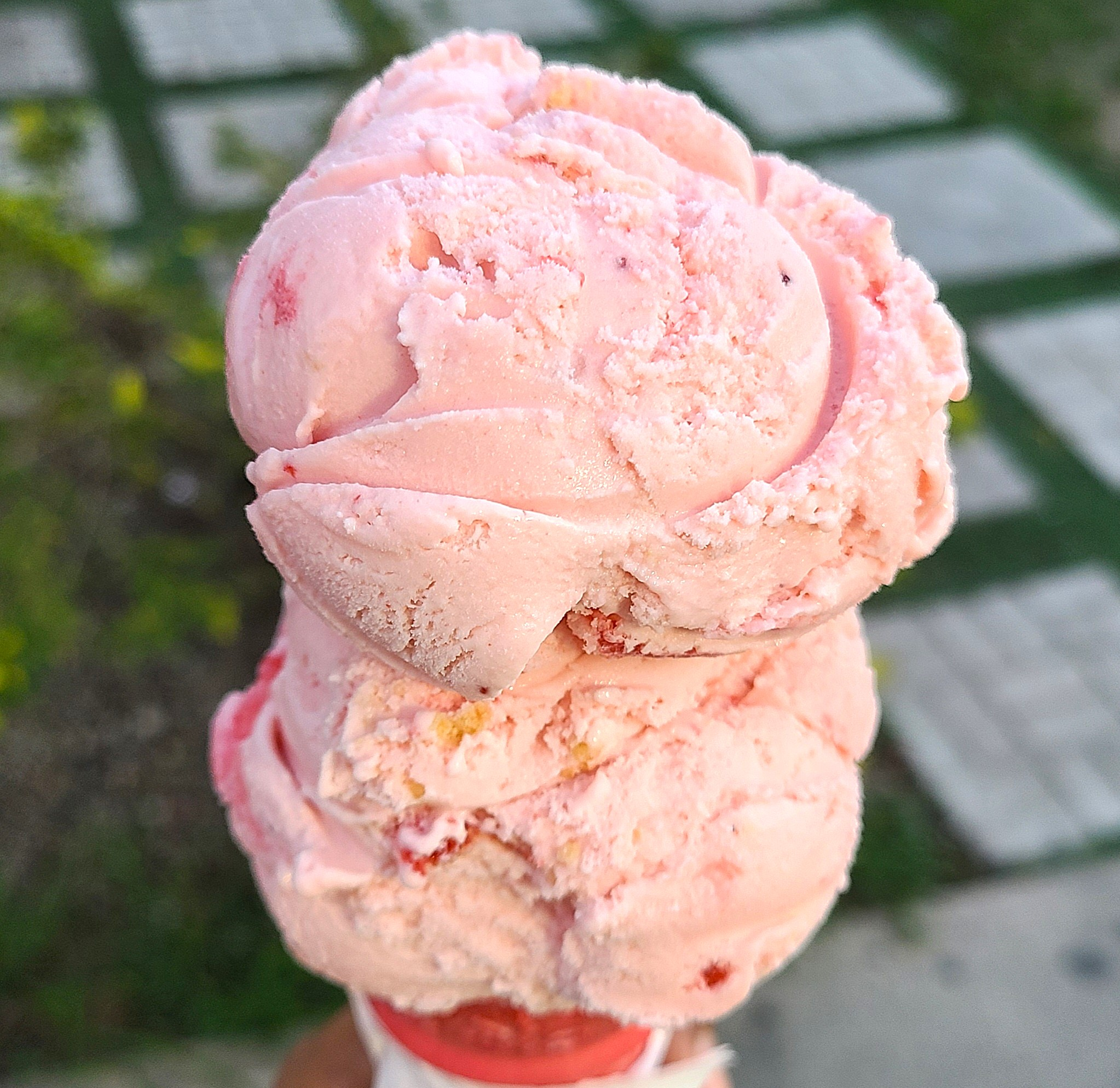
Devon House ice cream

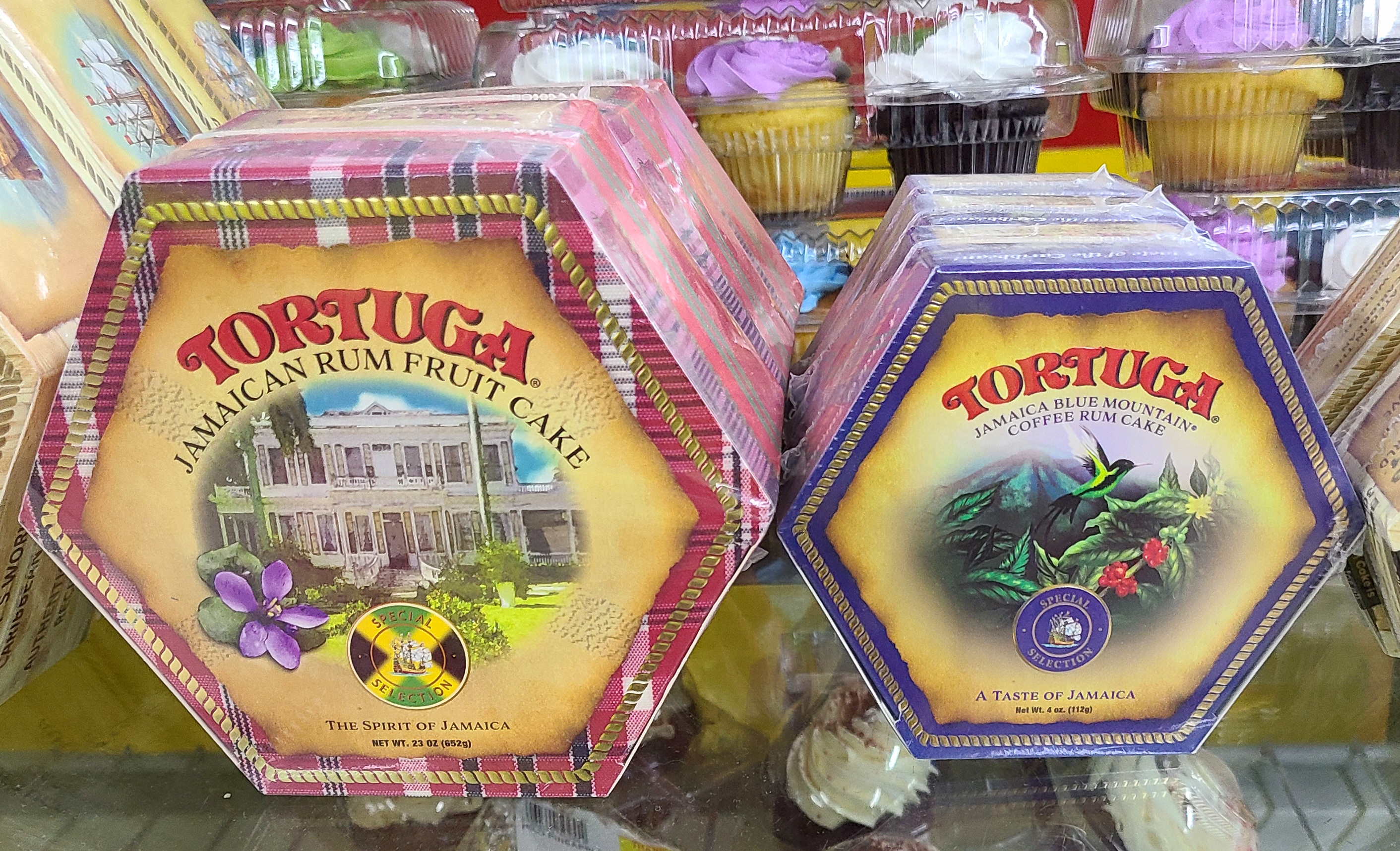
Rum fruit and coffee cakes

== Jamaican food abroad ==
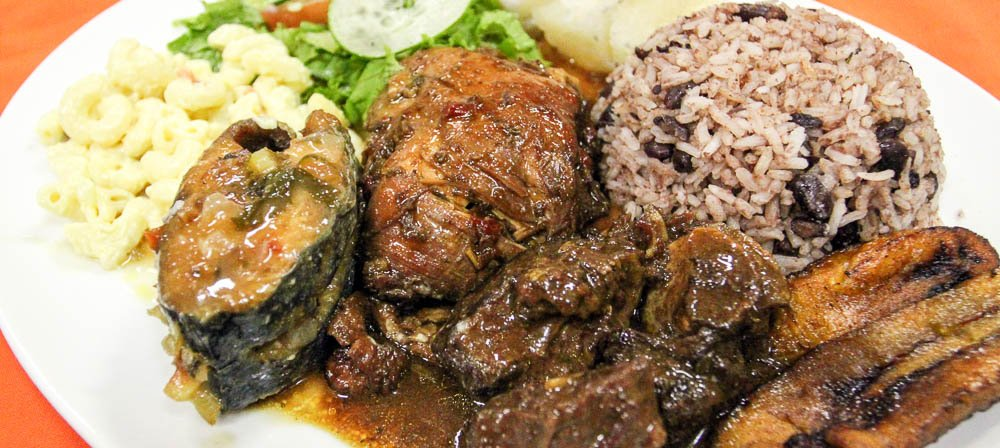
Costa Rican dinner from Puerto Limón (an area with Jamaican descendants).

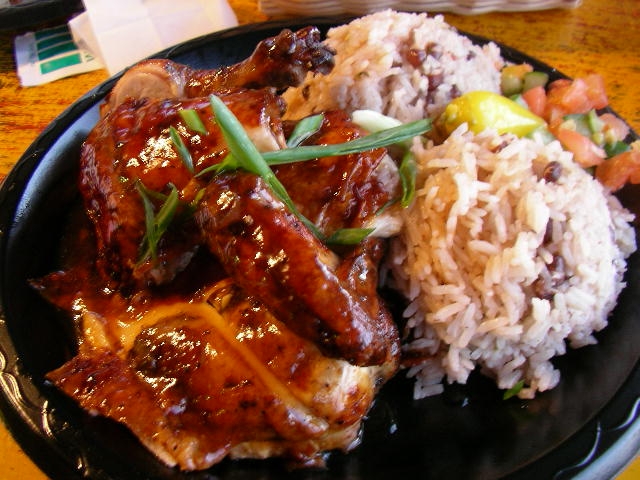
Jamaican food— jerk chicken served with rice and peas, in Guam.

Jamaican cuisine is available throughout North America, the United Kingdom, and other places with a sizeable Jamaican population or descendants, such as coastal Central America and the Caribbean. Jamaican food can be found in other regions, and popular dishes often appear on the menus of non-Jamaican restaurants. In the United States, numerous restaurants are located throughout New York's boroughs, Atlanta, West Palm Beach, Fort Lauderdale, Washington DC, Philadelphia, and other metropolitan areas. In Canada, Jamaican restaurants can be found in the Toronto metropolitan area, as well as Vancouver, Montreal, and Ottawa.

Golden Krust Caribbean Bakery & Grill is a chain of about 120 franchised restaurants found throughout the U.S., which sells Jamaican patties, buns, breads, and other popular Jamaican dishes. They also supply food to several institutions in New York. Juicy Patties, one of Jamaica's first patty companies to be established, has also expanded to other regions.

== Other cuisines in Jamaica ==
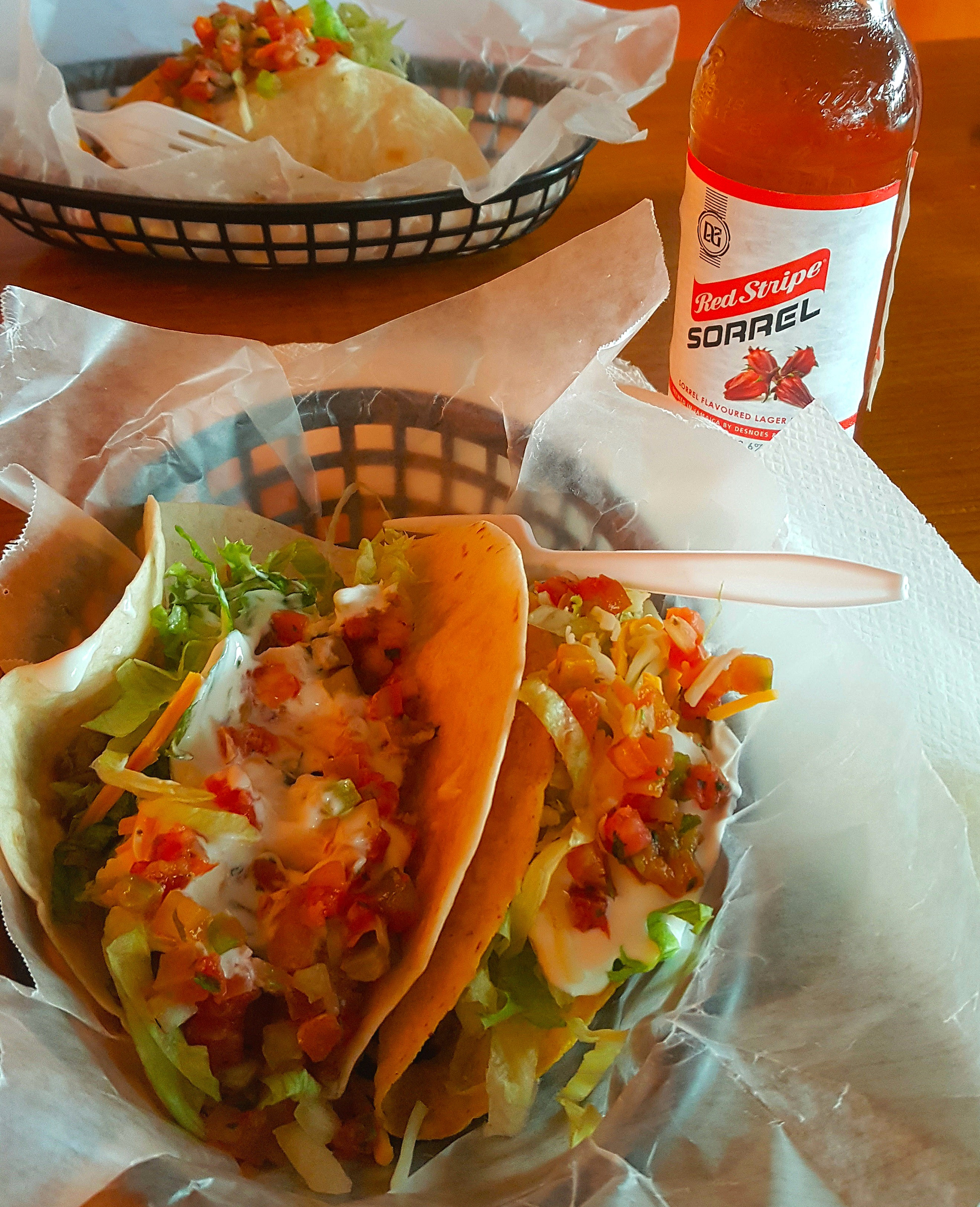
Jerk chicken tacos, in Jamaica

International cuisines have been introduced and blended with Jamaican cuisine, due to waves of migration from other parts of the world, tourism, the growth of the restaurant and hotel industries, the establishment of businesses (including eateries) by foreigners in Jamaica, and the exposure of locals and the diaspora, particularly Jamaican chefs, to international gastronomy and culinary practices. As such, other cuisines like Latin, Japanese, Korean, Thai, Italian, Greek, French, Spanish, Mediterranean and American cuisines can be found in Jamaica. It is common to find fusion restaurants across the island offering blends of Jamaican foods and beverages with dishes from other cuisines. An array of fusion dishes are created on the island, especially in eateries and hotels, like Jamaican-style tacos, tapas, soul food, pastas, pizzas, calzone (called "pizza patty"), tostadas, paninis, burgers, quesadillas, salads, crêpes, waffles, frittatas, cocktails, desserts and a variety of international epicurean dishes.

== See also ==
- Caribbean cuisine
- Ital
