= List of Jamaican dishes and foods =

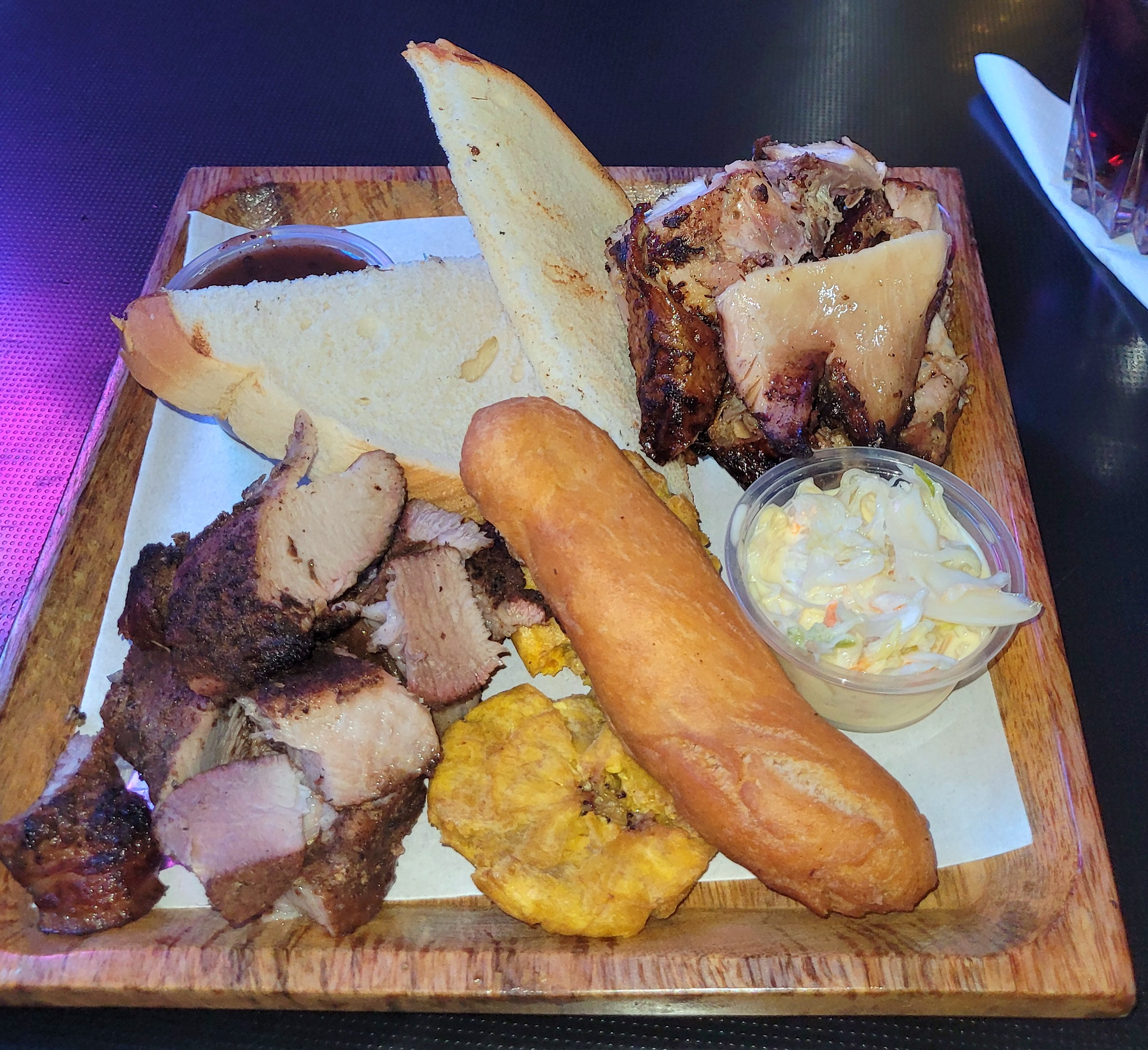
Jerk chicken and pork served with hard dough bread, jerk sauce, festival, fried pressed plantain and coleslaw, in Jamaica.

This is a list of Jamaican dishes and foods. Jamaican cuisine includes a mixture of cooking techniques, ingredients, flavours, spices and influences from the Taínos, Jamaica's indigenous people, the Spanish, Portuguese, French, Scottish, Irish, English, African, Indian, Chinese and Middle Eastern people, who have inhabited the island. It is also influenced by indigenous crops, as well as, crops and livestock introduced to the island from Mesoamerica, Europe, tropical West Africa and Southeast Asia— which are now grown locally. Though Jamaican cuisine includes distinct dishes from the different cultures brought to the island, many Jamaican dishes are fusions of techniques, ingredients and traditions. A wide variety of seafood, tropical fruits, and meats are available.

== Jamaican dishes and foods ==
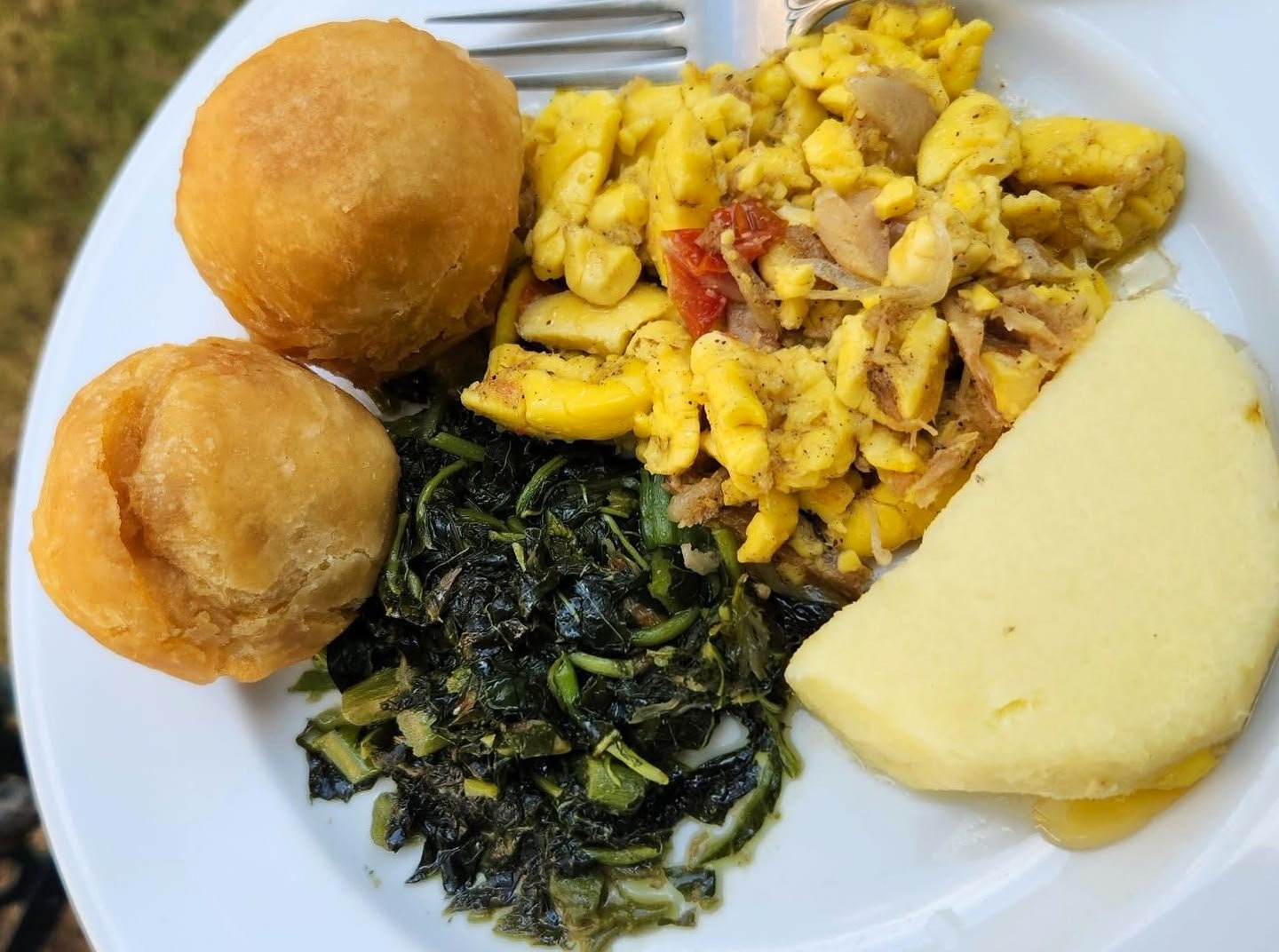
Ackee and saltfish (Jamaica's national dish) with callaloo, fried dumplings and boiled yam (west african yam).

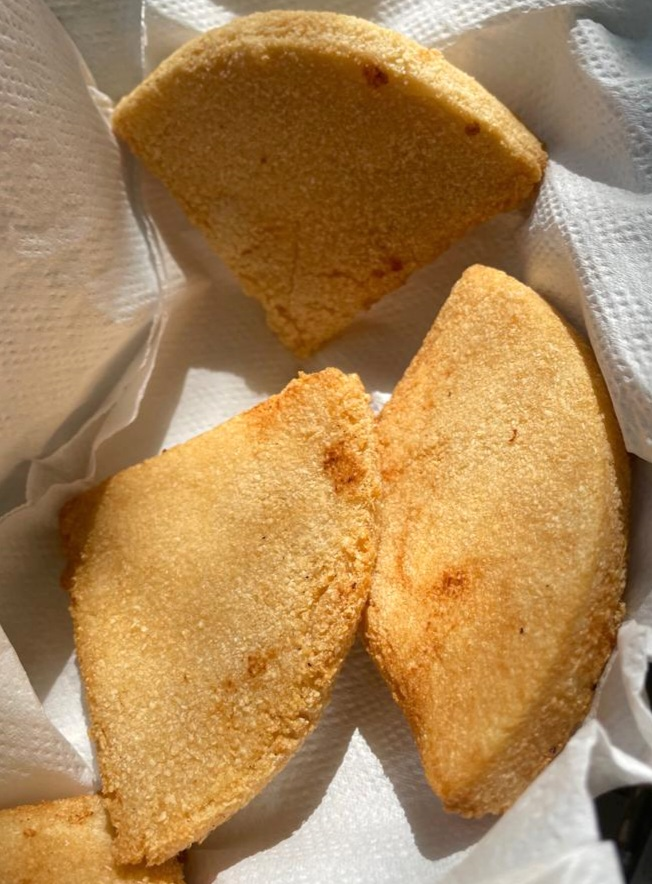
Fried bammies—cassava flatbread which originated from the Taínos.

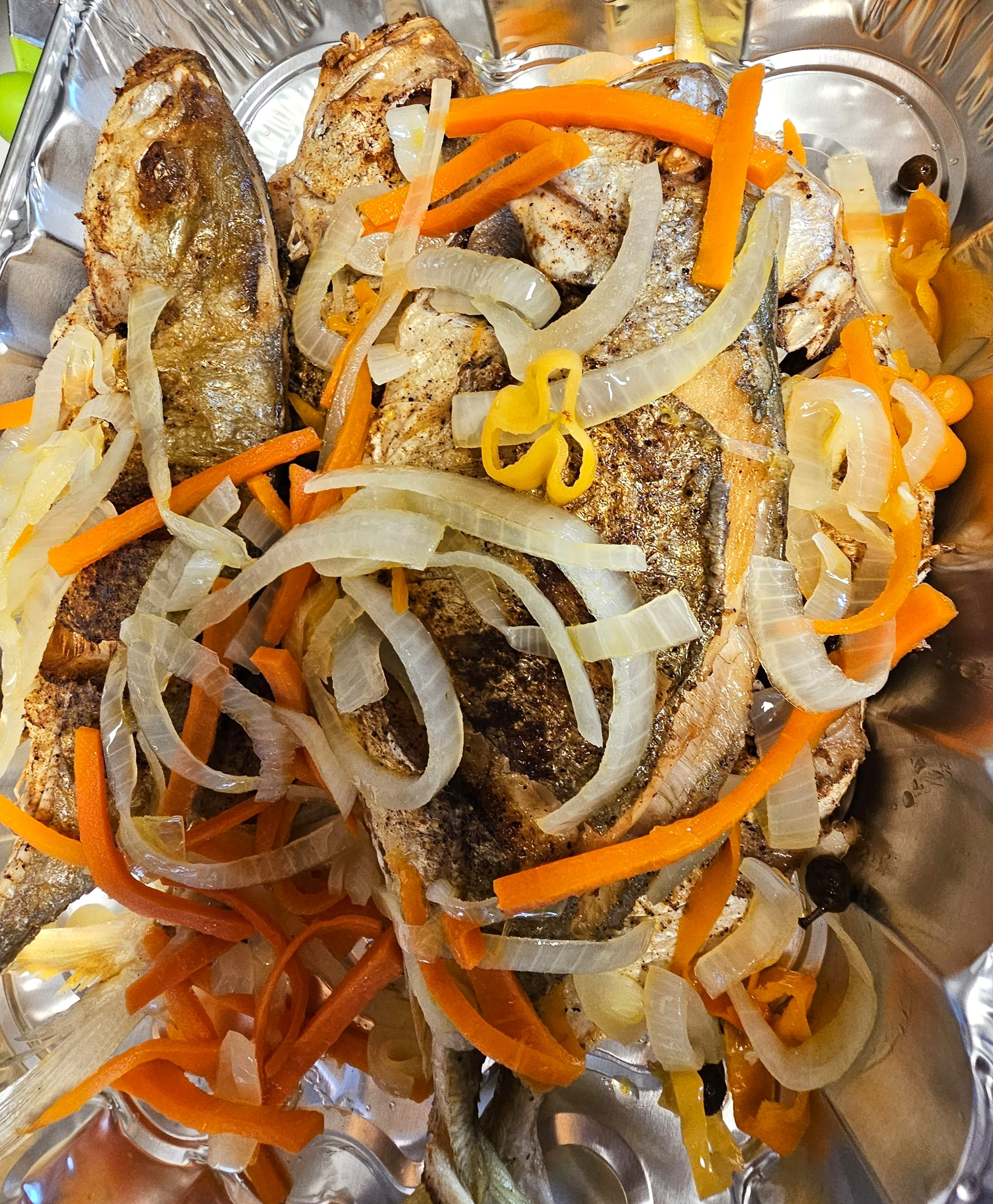
Escoveitch fish— usually served with festival and bammy.

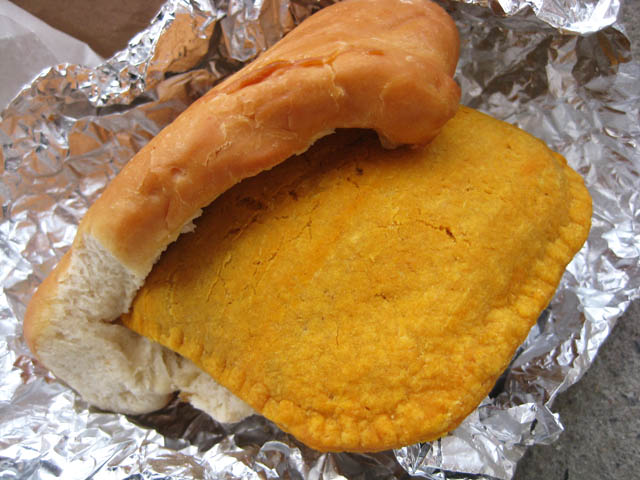
Coco bread, sandwiching a Jamaican patty.

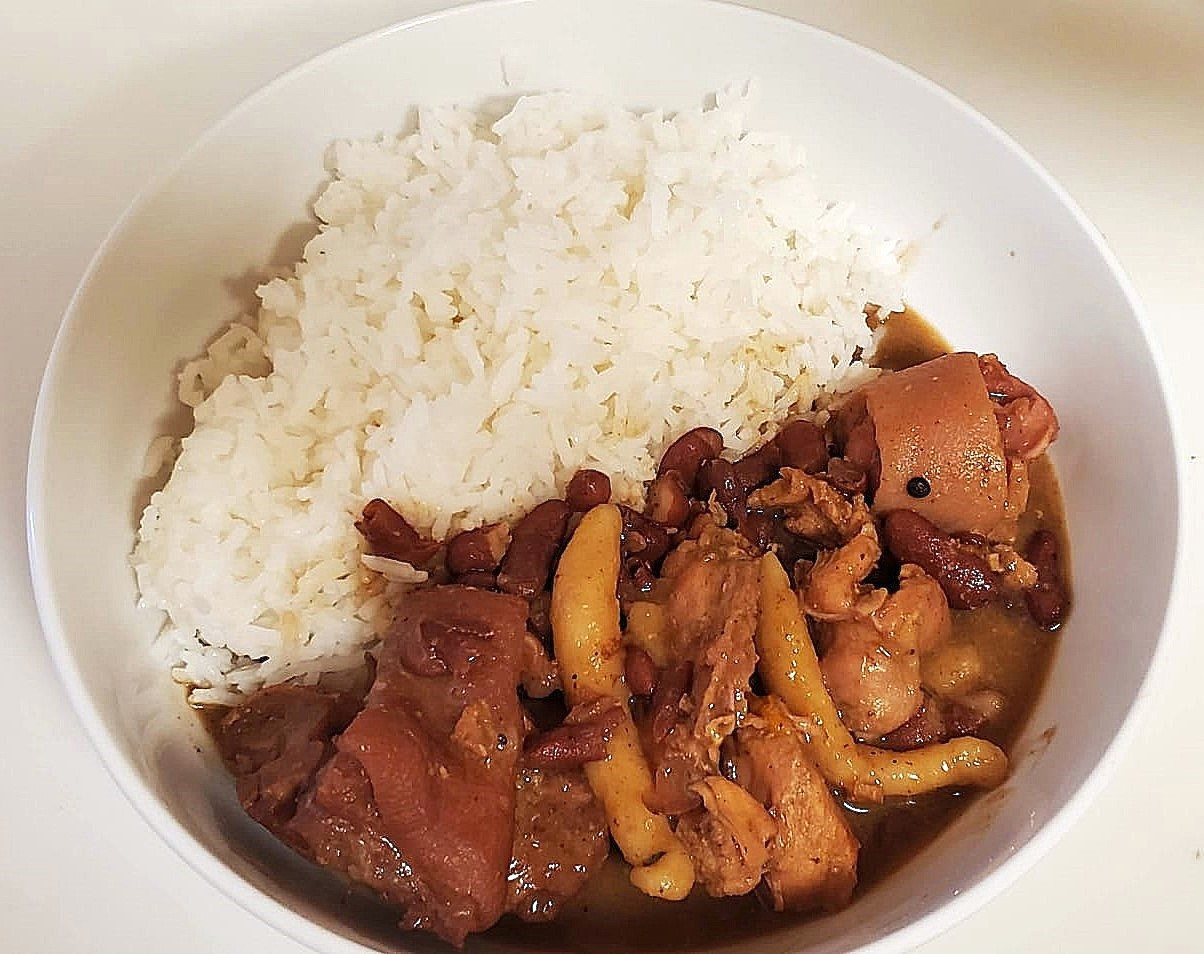
Stew peas

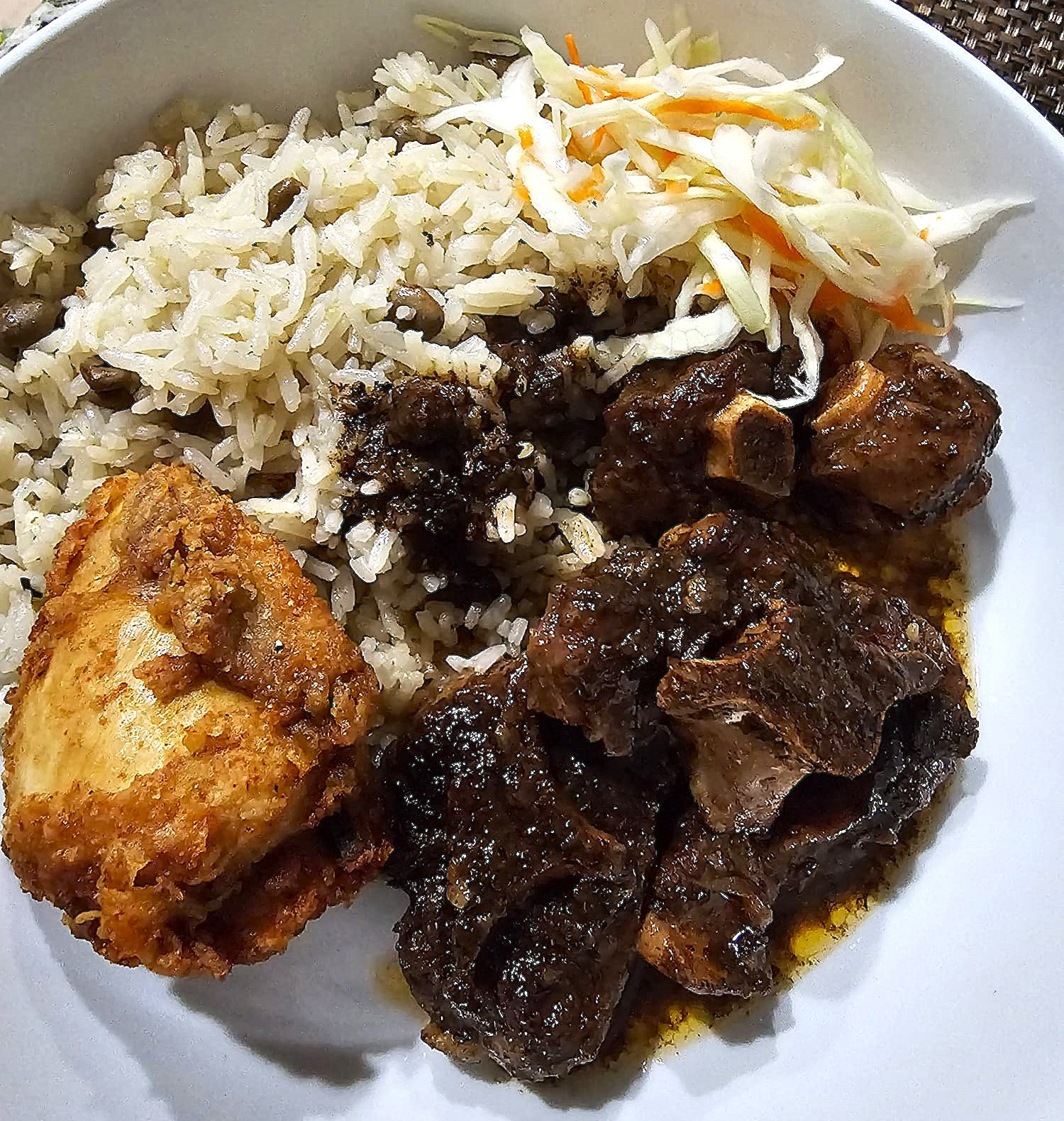
Typical Jamaican meal—fried chicken and oxtail, with a side of rice and peas (with gungo) and salad.

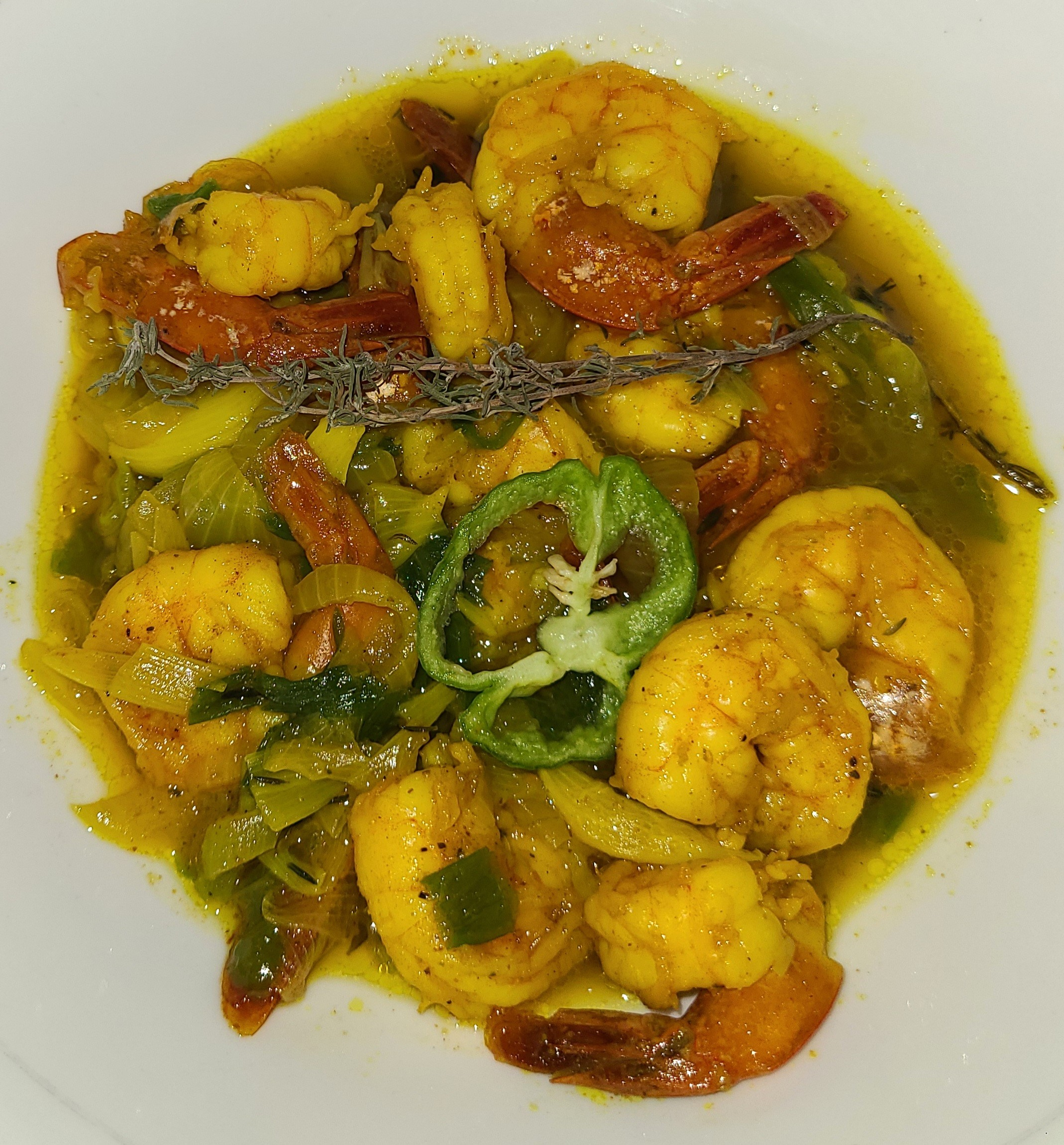
Curried shrimp

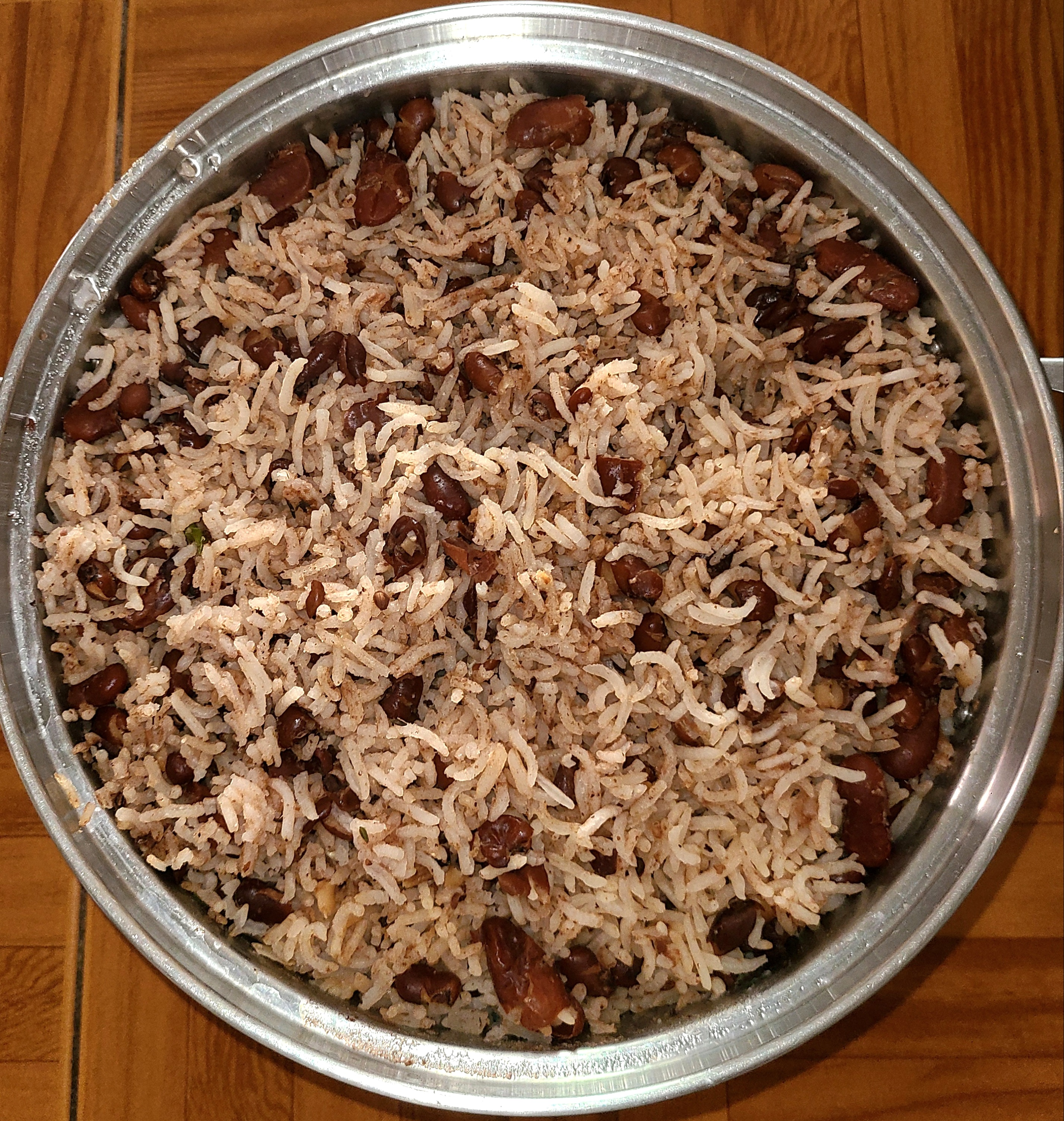
Rice and peas

- Ackee and saltfish, made from the local fruit ackee and dried and salted cod (saltfish). This is the national dish of Jamaica.
- Baked chicken
- Bammy
- Bar-B-fried chicken (a combination of fried and barbecued chicken)
- Banana fritters
- Bok choy
- Breadfruit (roasted, fried or boiled)
- Brown stew meats (chicken, pork, beef etc.)
- Callaloo
- Callaloo rice
- Cassava
- Cheese bread
- Chop suey
- Coco bread, usually eaten with the Jamaican patty as a sandwich.
- Coconut curry (shrimp, fish, lobster and chicken)
- Coconut rice
- Cocoyam
- Conch (roasted, curried or jerked)
- Corn (roasted or boiled)
- Cornbread, golden sweet bread
- Corned pork or beef
- Cow foot (stewed)
- Crab (boiled or curried)
- Curry chicken
- Curry goat or mutton
- Dumpling (boiled, fried or baked)
- Escoveitch fish
- Fish (brown stew, steamed, fried, roasted or curried)
- Fricassee chicken (similar to brown stew)
- Fried chicken
- Fried rice
- Garlic chicken and seafood (shrimp, fish, lobster and conch)
- Grilled meats and seafood (chicken, steak, fish and lobster etc.)
- Green bananas, eaten boiled, or sliced and fried to make banana chips.
- Hard dough bread
- Jamaican festival, similar to a hushpuppy
- Jamaican Gratto (Grotto) bread, a dense, layered and slightly sweet traditional bread with a chewy texture.
- Jamaican patty, a savoury and spicy pastry filled with meats (such as beef, curried chicken, goat, shrimp, lobster), or other ingredients like ackee, callaloo, cheese, soy or vegetables etc.
- Jerk meats, usually chicken and pork, but may include sausages and seafood.
- Jamaican Malah chicken
- Liver (typically brown stew chicken or cow's liver)
- Lobster (thermidor, garlic, jerk, fried, grilled and curried)
- Meatballs
- Minced meat (chicken or beef)
- Macaroni and cheese
- Oxtail with (broad beans)
- Pan chicken (jerked chicken prepared and sold by street food vendors along with hard dough bread)
- Peanut (raw, hot or roasted as a street snack)
- Peg bread
- Peppered shrimp, spicy seasoned and cooked (red in colour)
- Pepper steak
- Pineapple chicken
- Plantain (green or ripe), may be boiled or fried, and served as a side dish.
- Porridge, popular flavours include oatmeal, cornmeal, peanut, banana, plantain, and hominy corn etc.
- Potato salad
- Pot-roast ((chicken, beef, pork and mutton etc.)
- Pumpkin rice
- Rice and peas, the most popular style of rice consumed daily, and is a Sunday staple of most Jamaican households.
- Roti .
- Run down, a dish consisting of pickled mackerel, coconut milk, herbs and spices.
- Saltfish (sautéed or roasted)
- Salt mackerel (sautéed)
- Shrimp (garlic, coconut, jerk, sweet and sour, stir-fried and curried)
- Shredded cabbage and carrot (coleslaw)
- Spanish rice (yellow rice)
- Seasoned rice (often includes saltfish and beans)
- Solomon gundy, a salt herring pâté
- Stamp and Go, saltfish fritters
- Steamed or stir-fry vegetables
- Stew peas, a stew of red peas (kidney beans) which may be vegetarian, or have pieces of meat added such as cured pigtail, salted pork or beef.
- Stir-fry (chicken, shrimp and vegetables)
- Sweet bread (softer than normal bread with a slight sweetness)
- Sweet potato (boiled, roasted, baked or fried)
- Sweet and sour (chicken, pork and shrimp)
- Taro, locally known as dasheen or coco
- Tripe and beans
- Turned cornmeal
- Water crackers
- Yam (roasted or boiled)
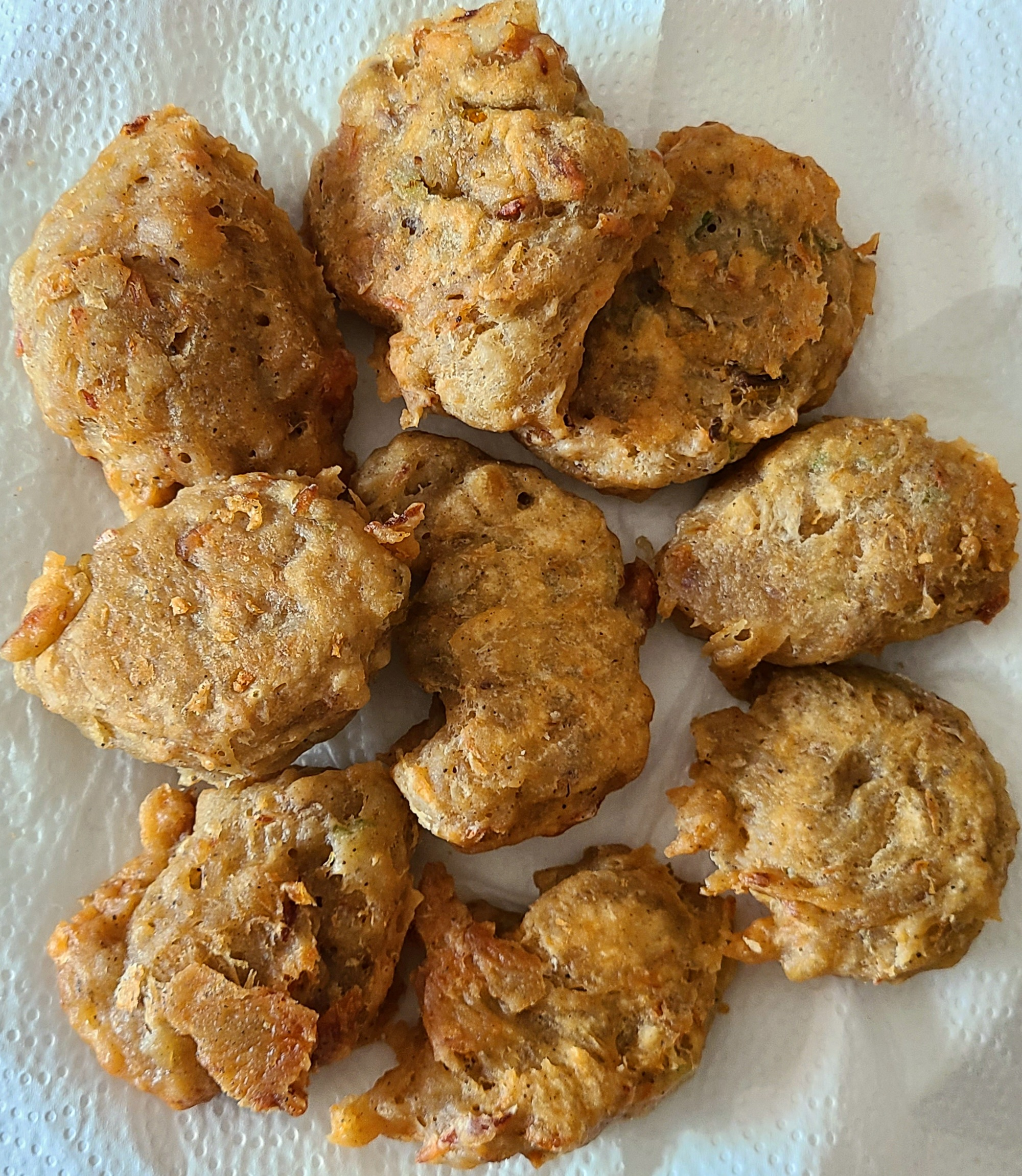
Stamp and Go (saltfish fritters)

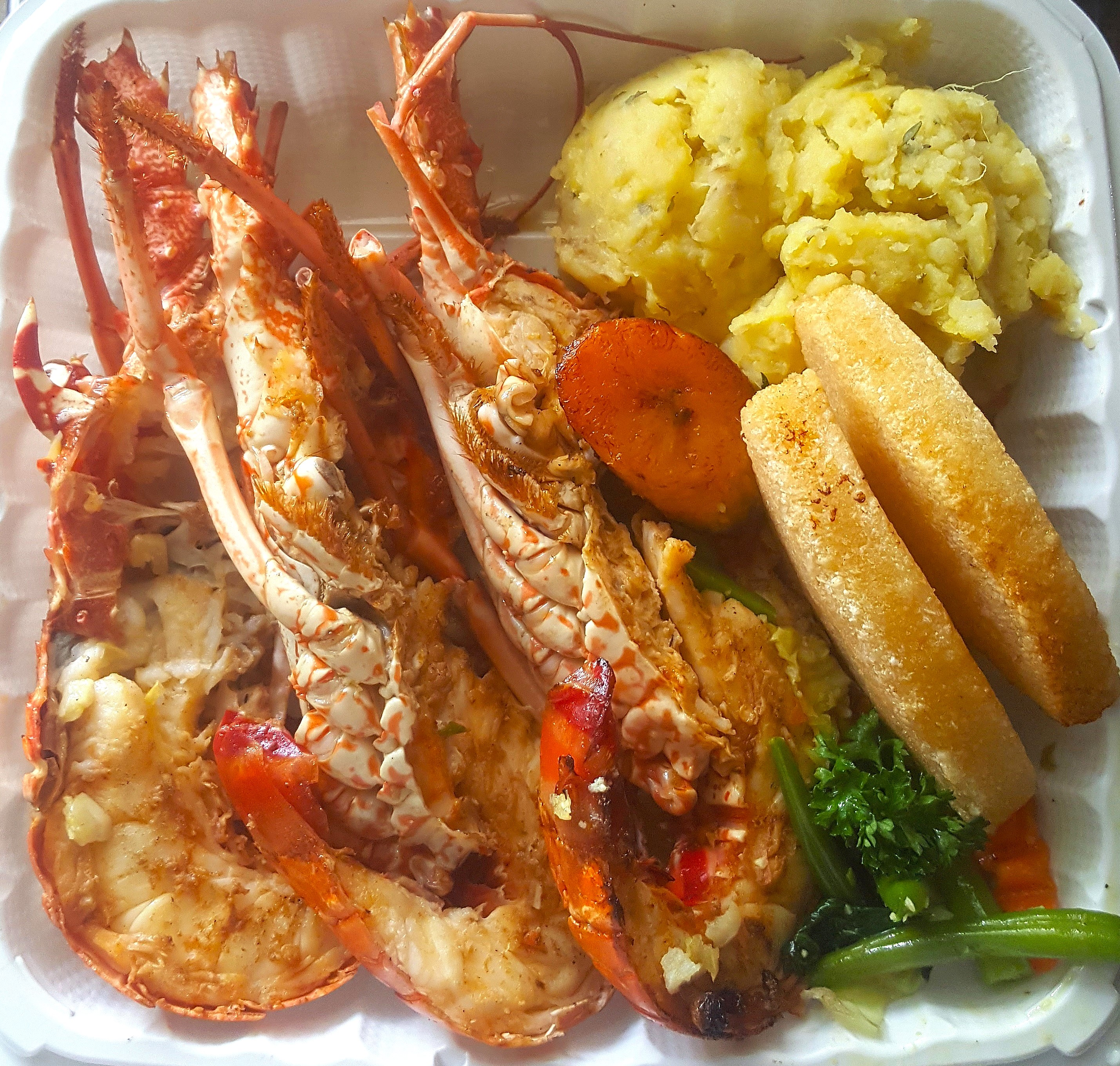
Garlic lobster with mashed sweet potato, stir-fry vegetables, fried bammy and ripe plantain.

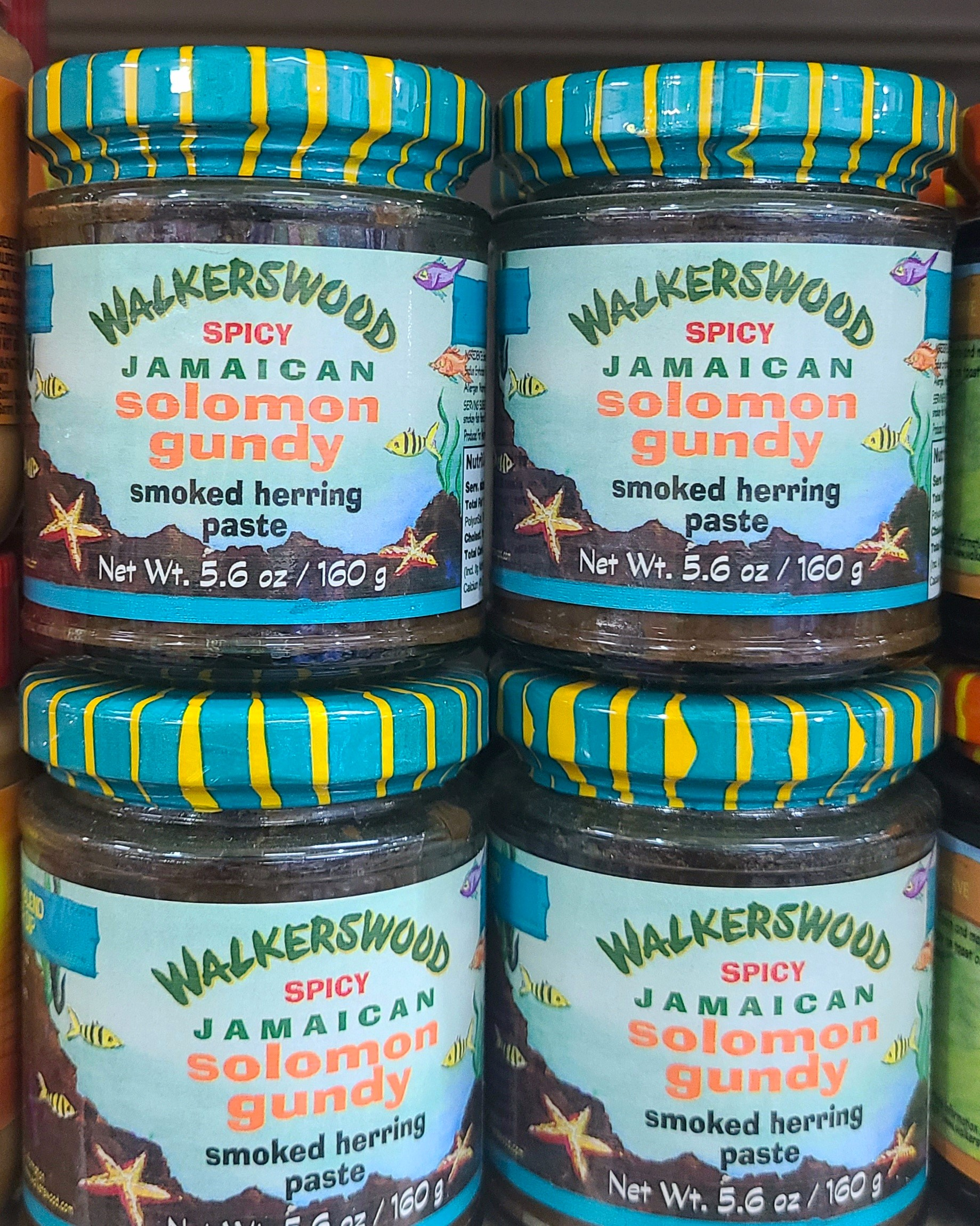
Solomon gundy— red herring pâté, typically eaten with crackers.

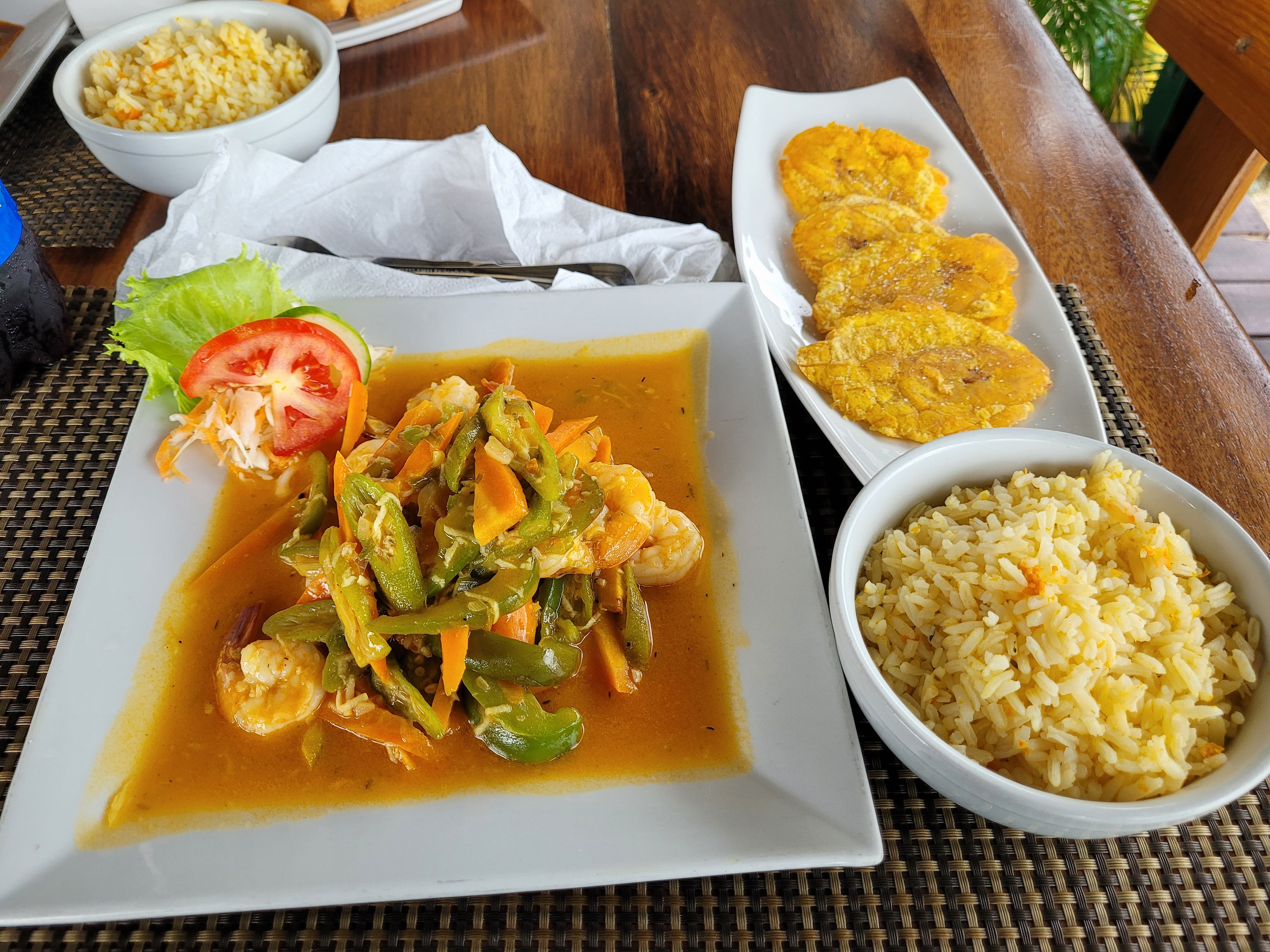
Garlic shrimp with okra and carrot, served with pumpkin rice and tostones.

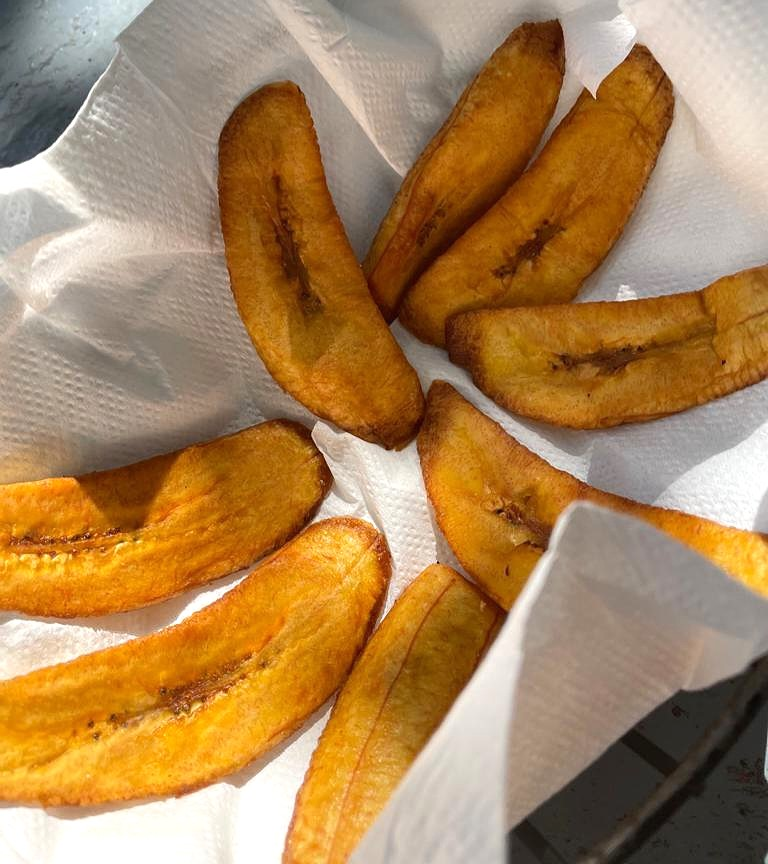
Fried ripe plantain

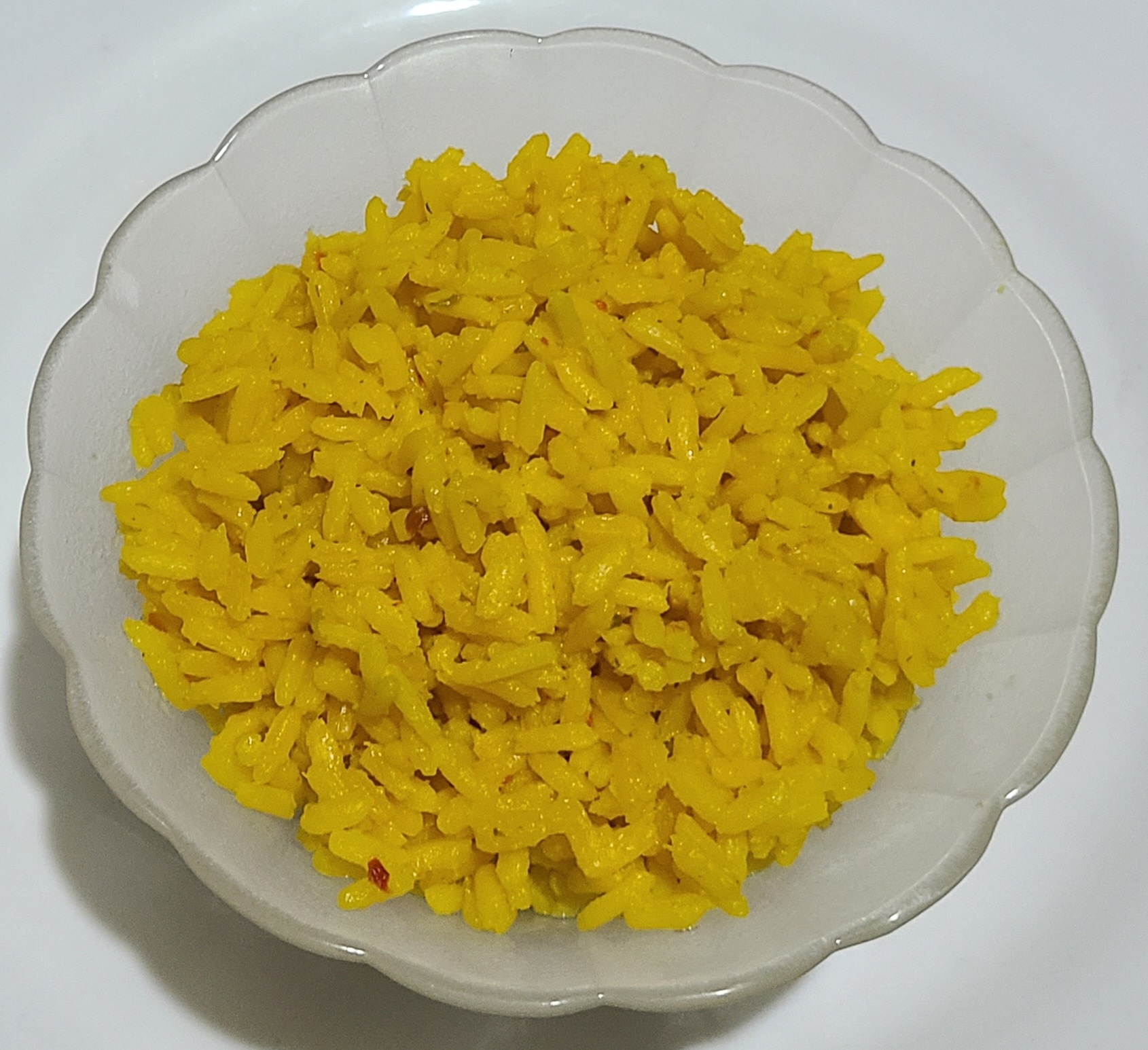
Jamaican Spanish rice

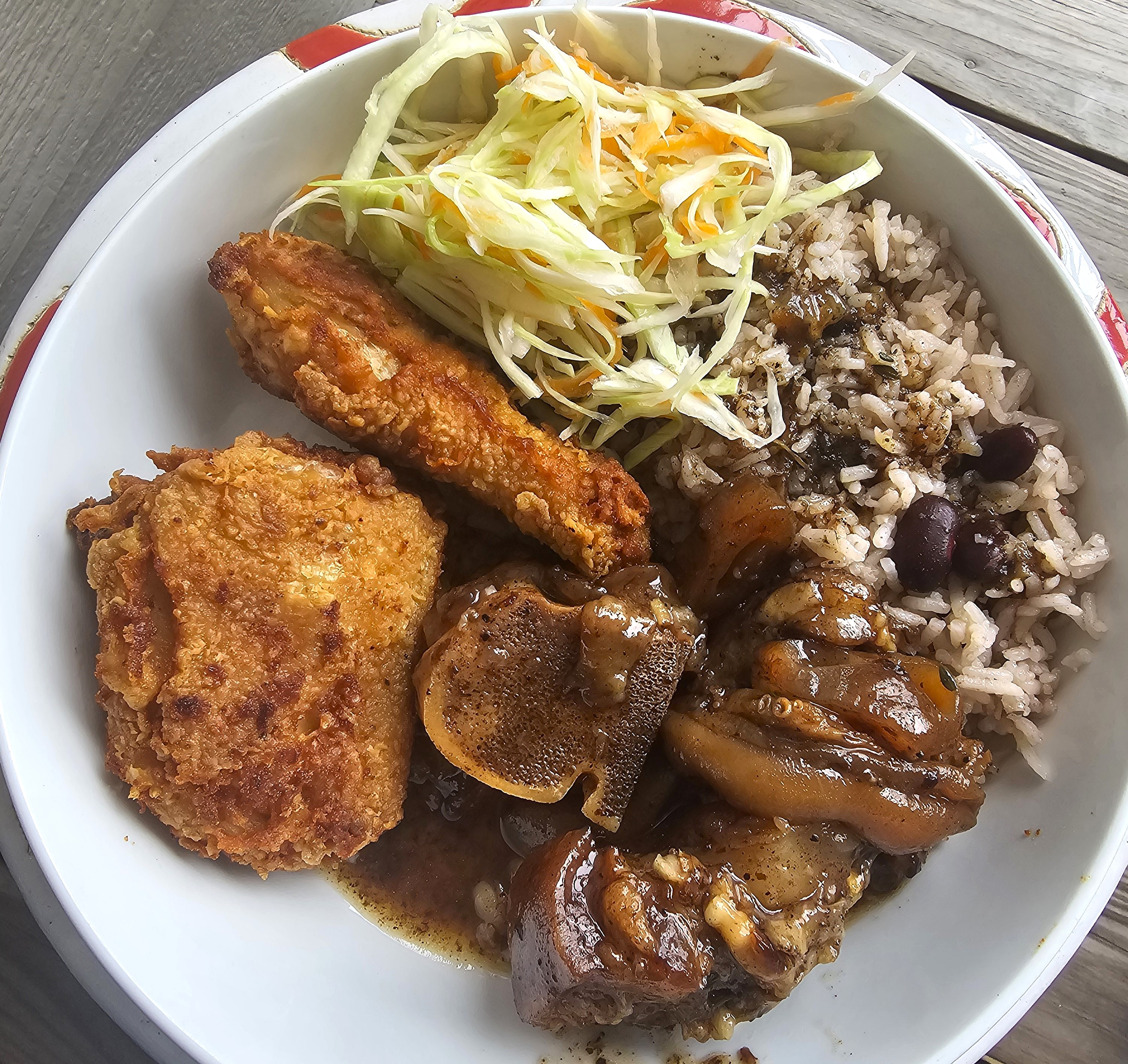
Brown stew pork and fried chicken, served with rice and peas and vegetables.

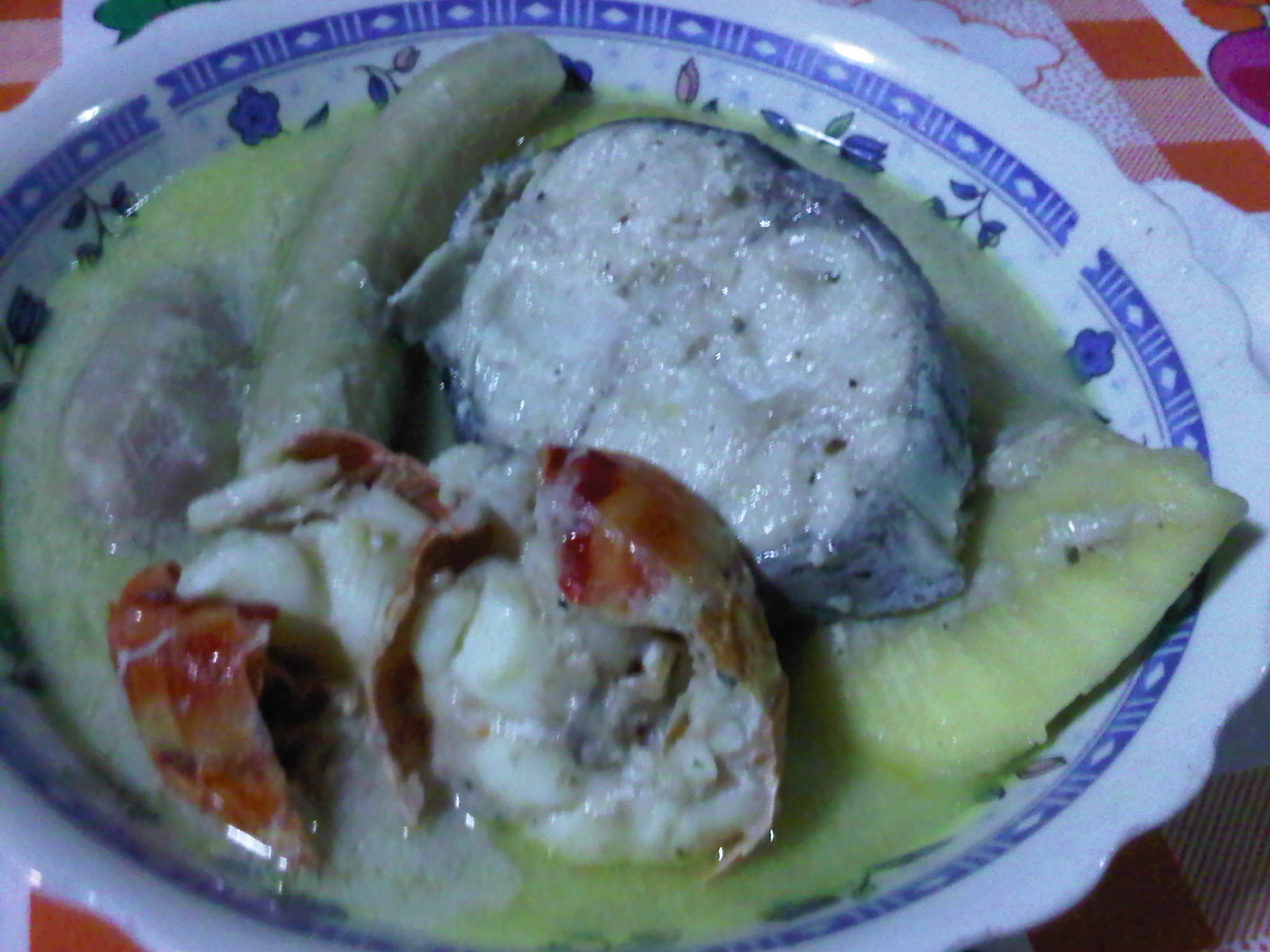
Run down is a stew dish in Jamaican and coastal Latin American cuisines.

== Fruits ==
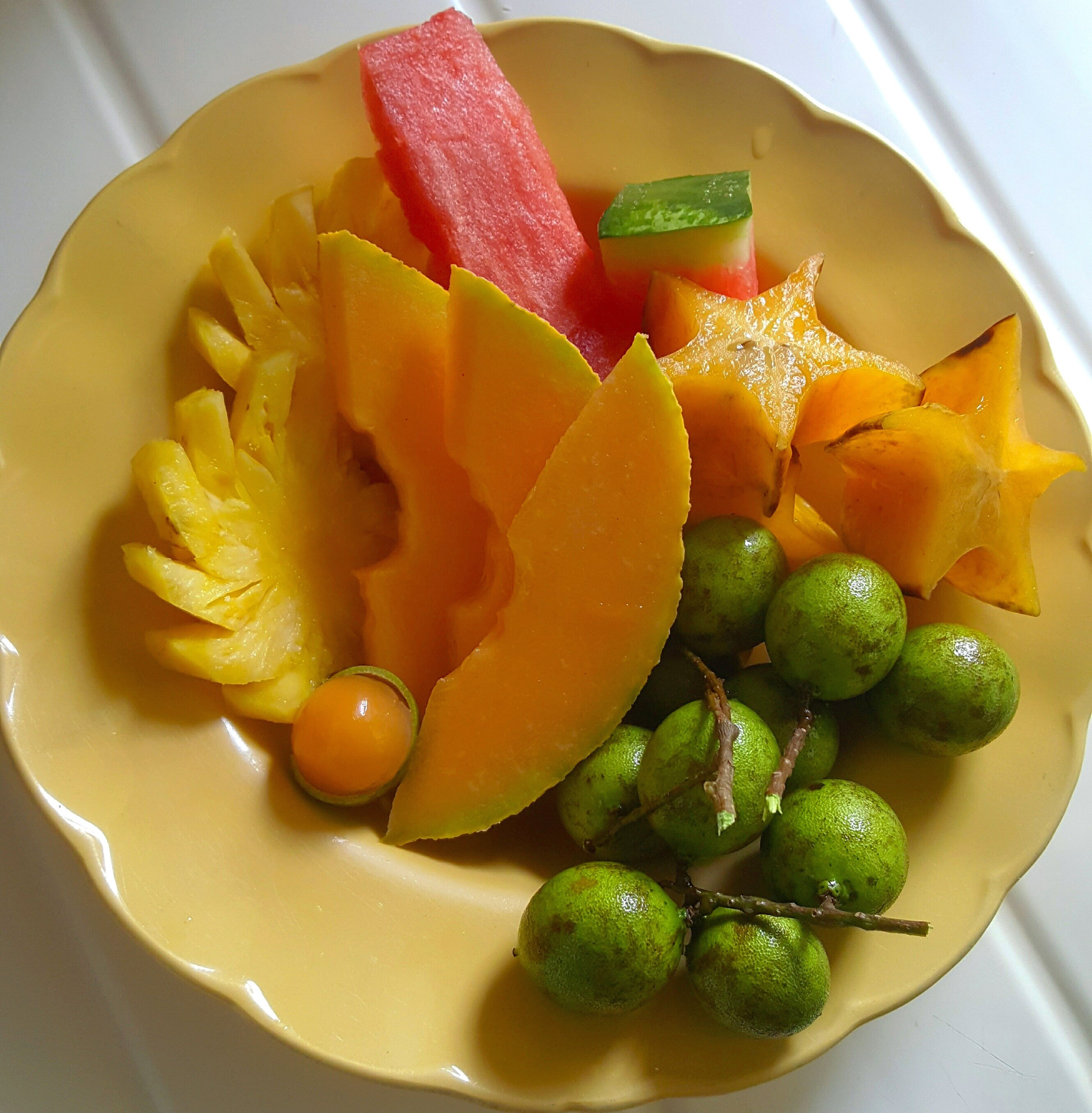
Some typical fruits eaten in Jamaica—pineapple, guinep, melon and starfruit.

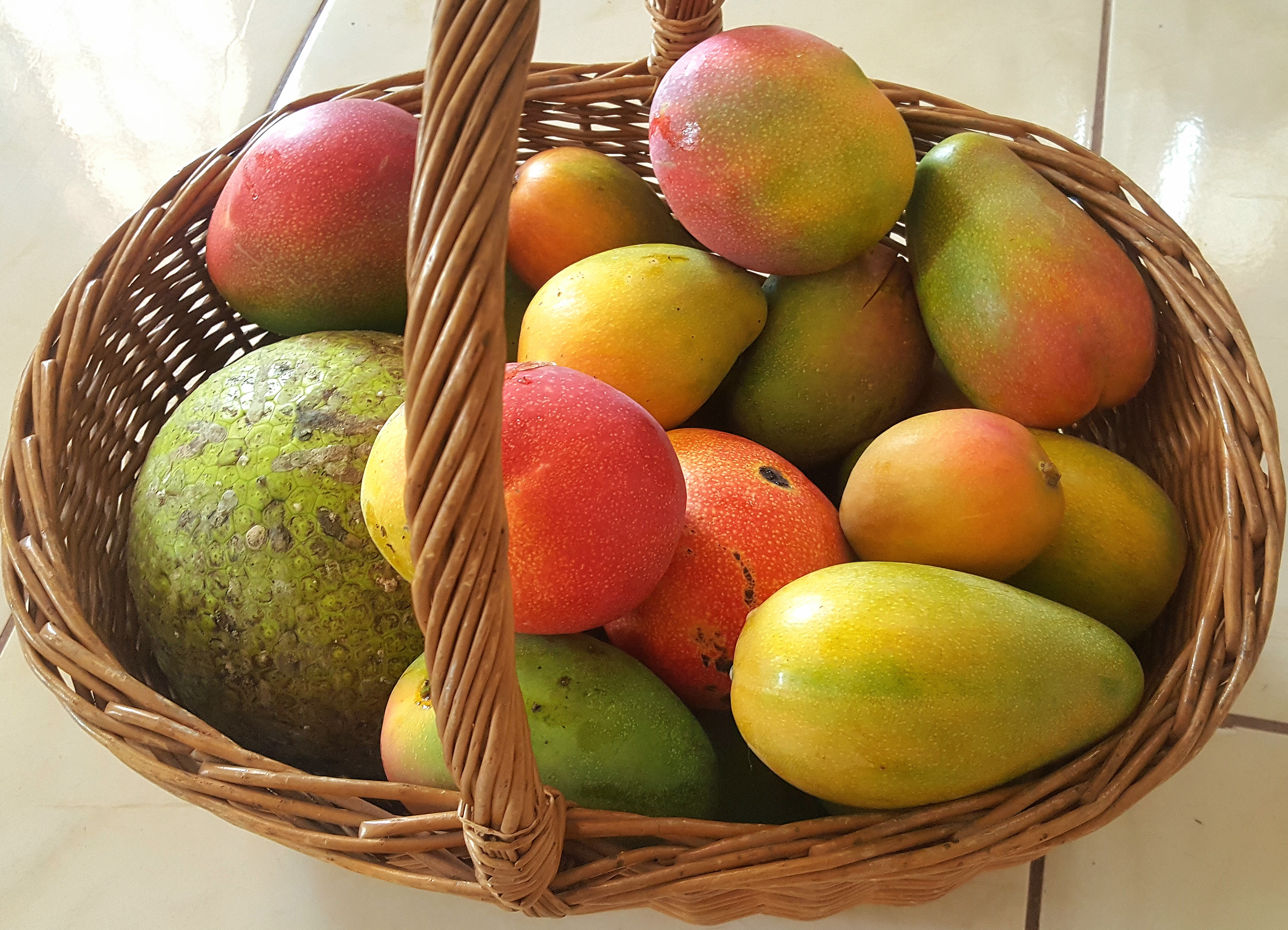
A basket of breadfruit and various Jamaican mangoes (East Indian, Julie and Haden).

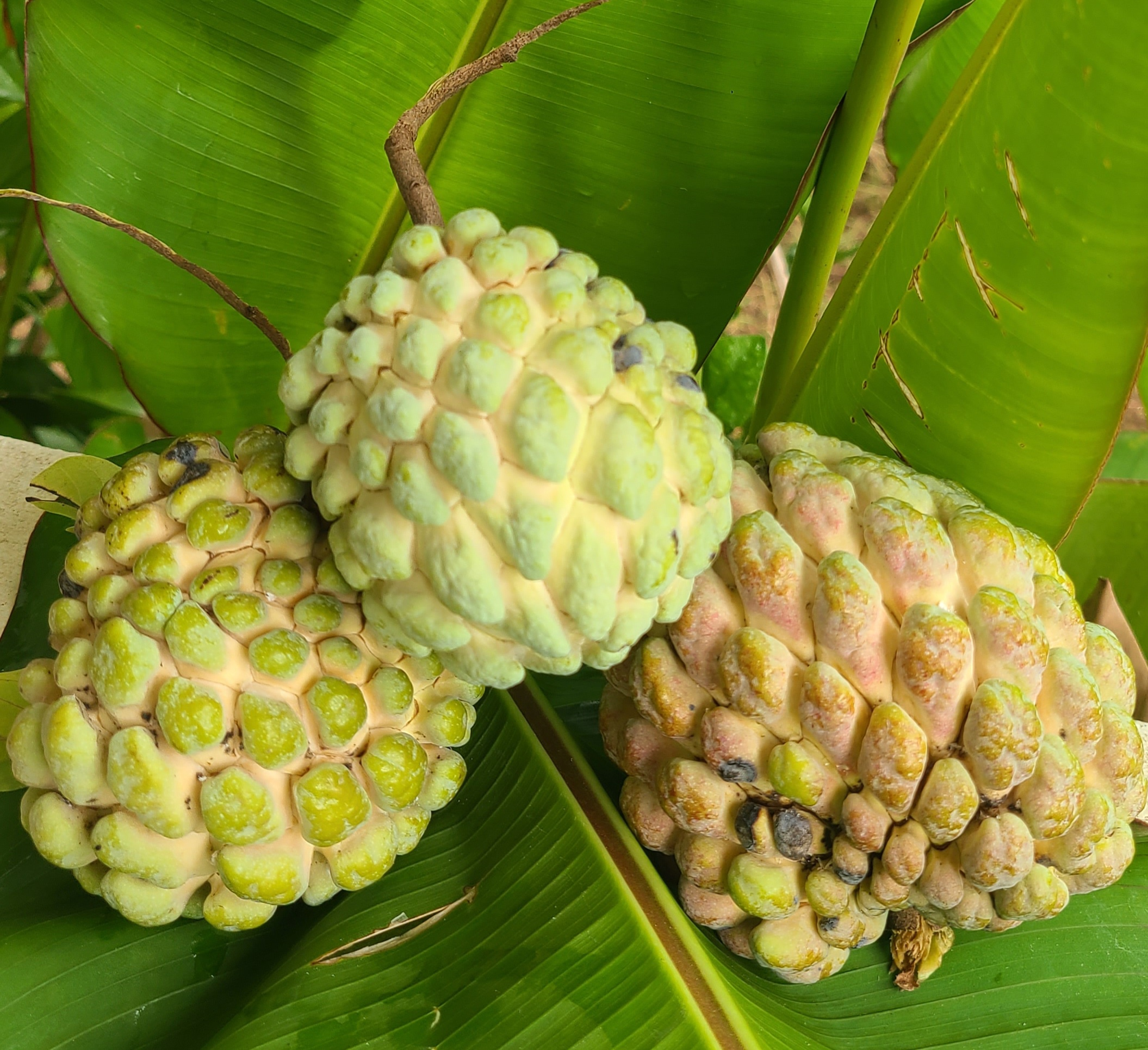
Sweetsop

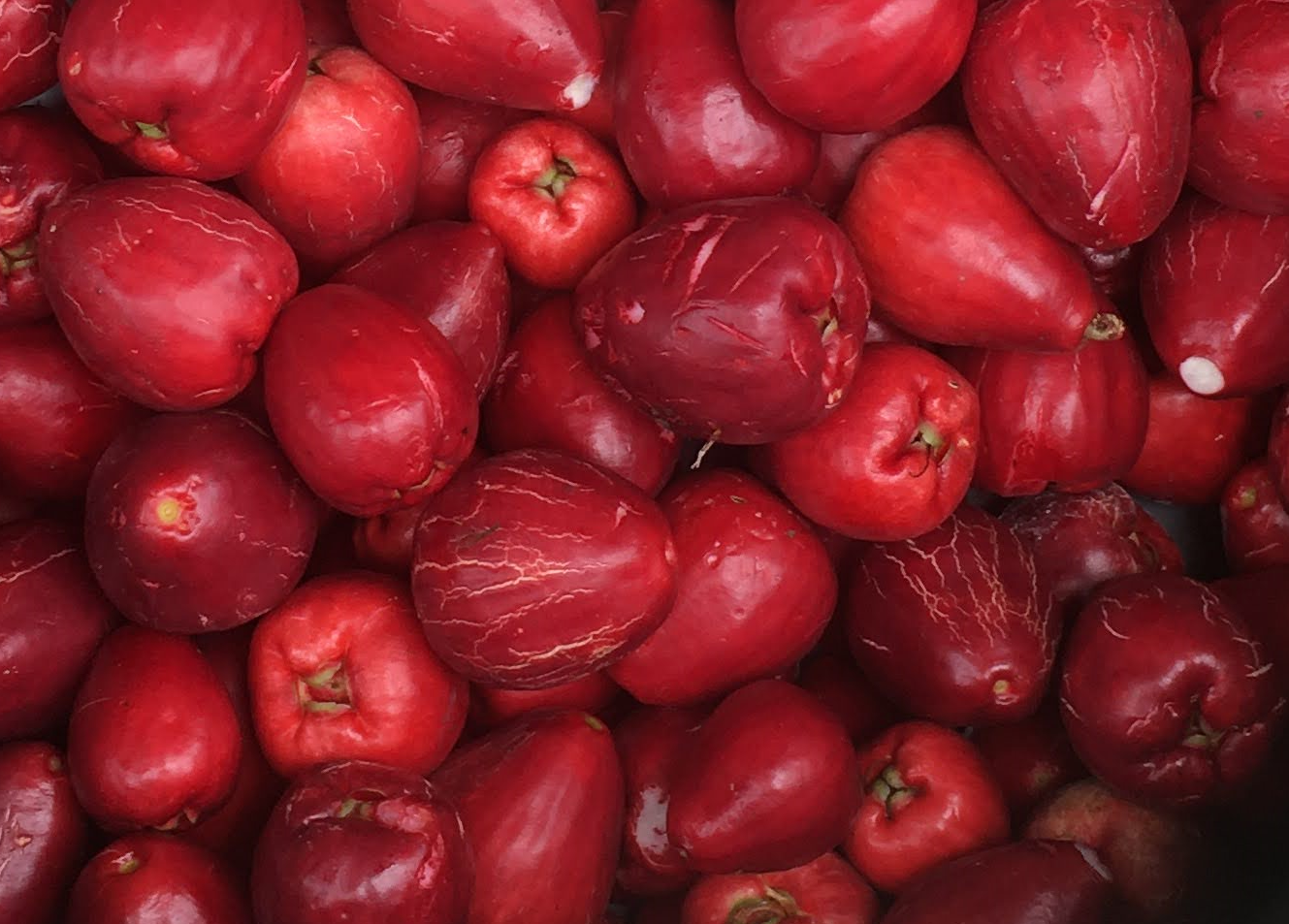
Otaheite apple

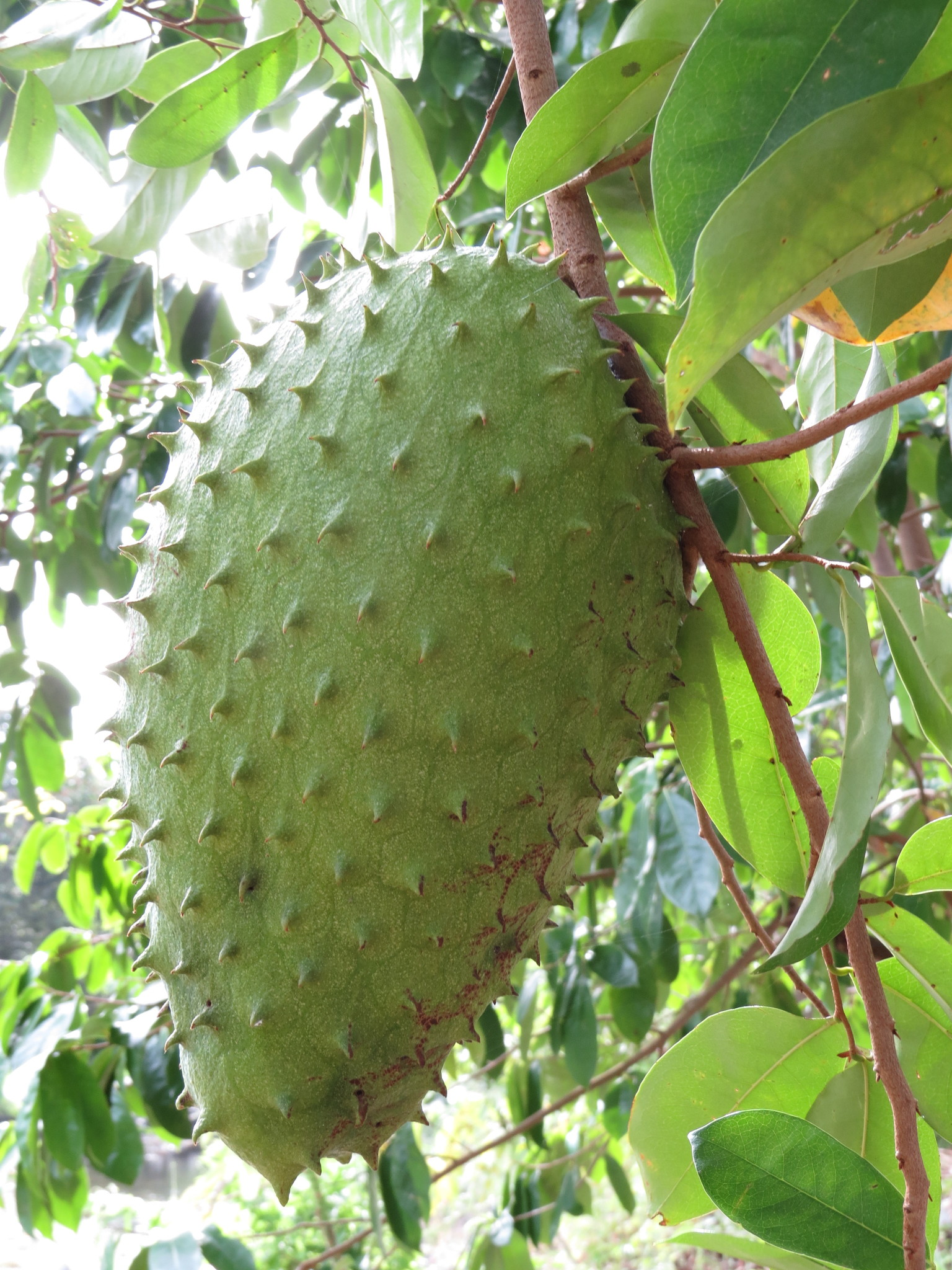
Soursop

- Acerola cherry
- Almond
- Avocado, also called 'pear'
- Banana, popular varieties include Gros Michel, Lacatan, Robusta, Grand Nain, Chinese, Apple, Thousand Fingers and Jamaican Red (Red Dacca) etc.
- Breadfruit
- Cacao
- Coconut- green coconuts provide coconut water and jelly, while the older coconuts are grated to make Jamaican desserts, sweets and coconut milk.
- Custard apple
- Damson (small and purple), may be chewed like gum.
- Grapefruit
- Guava
- Guinep
- Jackfruit
- Jamaican tangelo, also called 'ugli'
- Jimbilin
- June plum (Tahitian apple)
- Kumquat
- Lemon and lime
- Locust/Locass (small and green)
- Lychee
- Mammee Apple
- Mango, many species available locally. Popular local varieties are called East Indian, Number 11, Julie, Milli, Stringy, Tommy Atkins, Blackie, Bombay, Sweetie-come-brush-mi and Graham.
- Naseberry (known as sapodilla throughout the rest of the Caribbean)
- Otaheite apple (Malay apple)
- Orange, varieties include Seville, Valencia, Parson Brown, Mandarin, Navel and Ortanique.
- Passion fruit
- Paw-paw (papaya)
- Pineapple
- Plums (Hog plum and Governor plum)
- Pomegranate
- Ribena
- Rose apple, similar to guava
- Soursop
- Starapple
- Starfruit
- Stinking Toe
- Sugarcane— peeled and chewed to obtain the juice, or can be bought as bottled sugarcane juice.
- Sweetsop
- Tamarind
- Tangerine
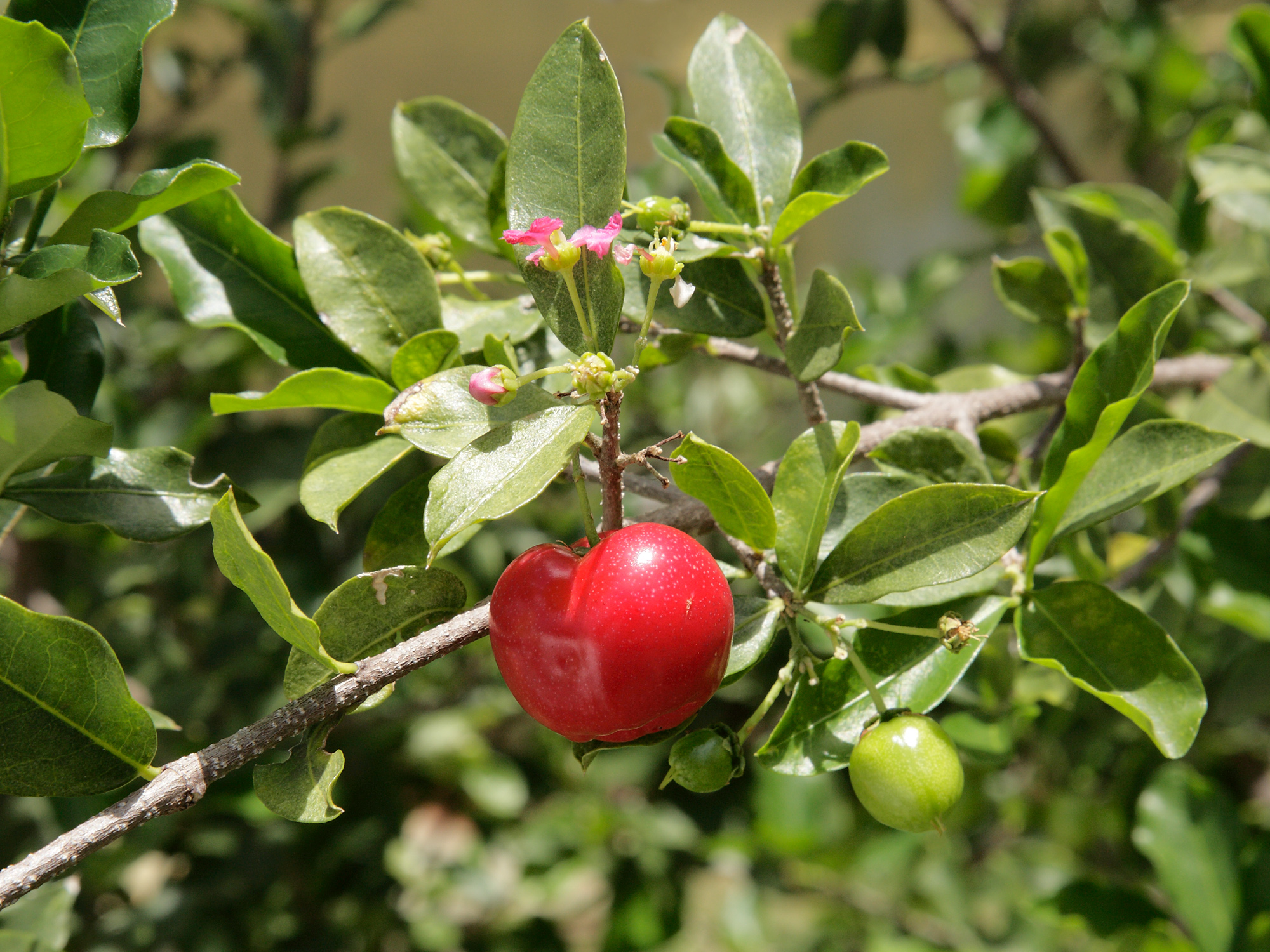
West Indian cherry or acerola

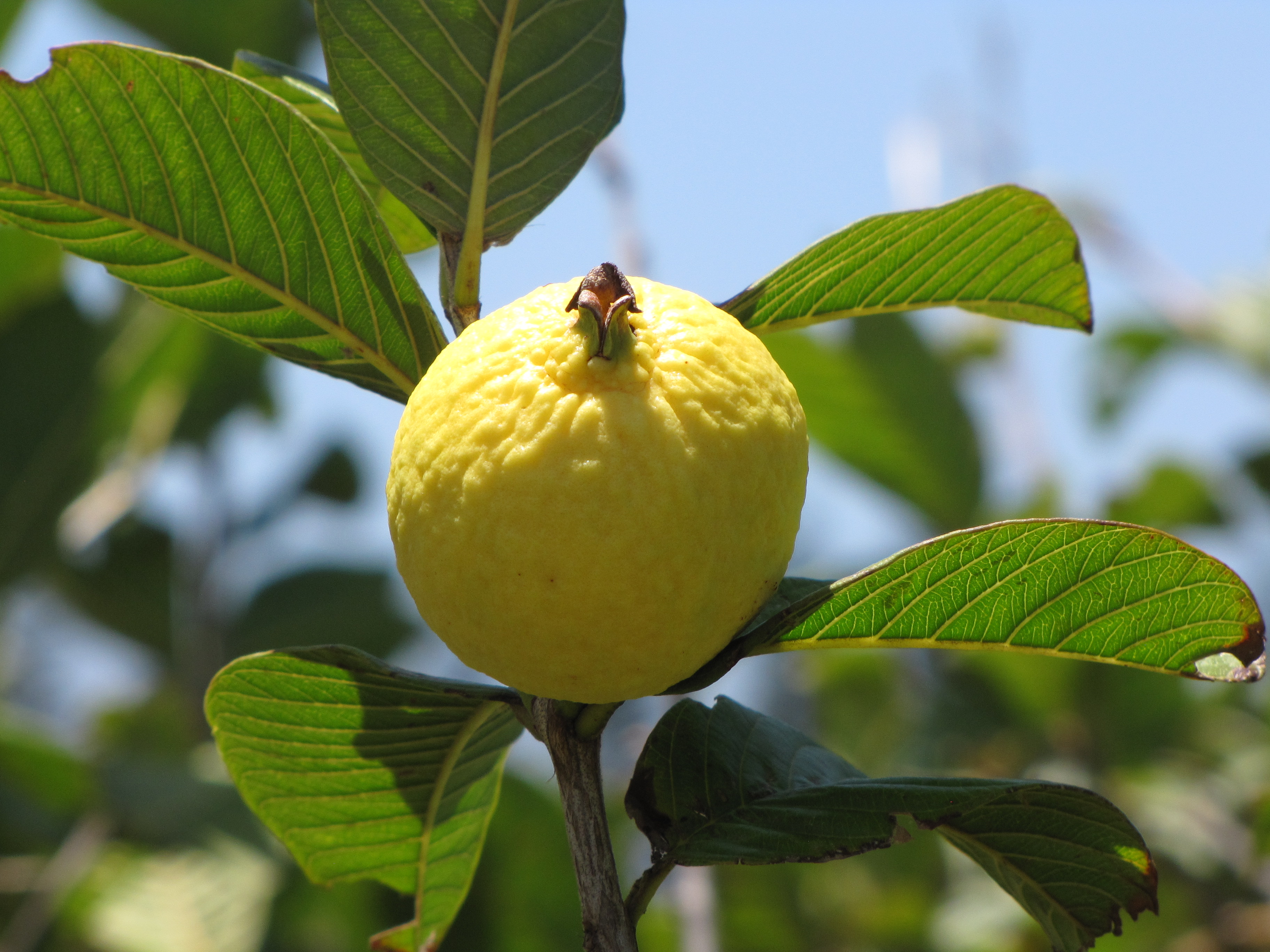
Guava

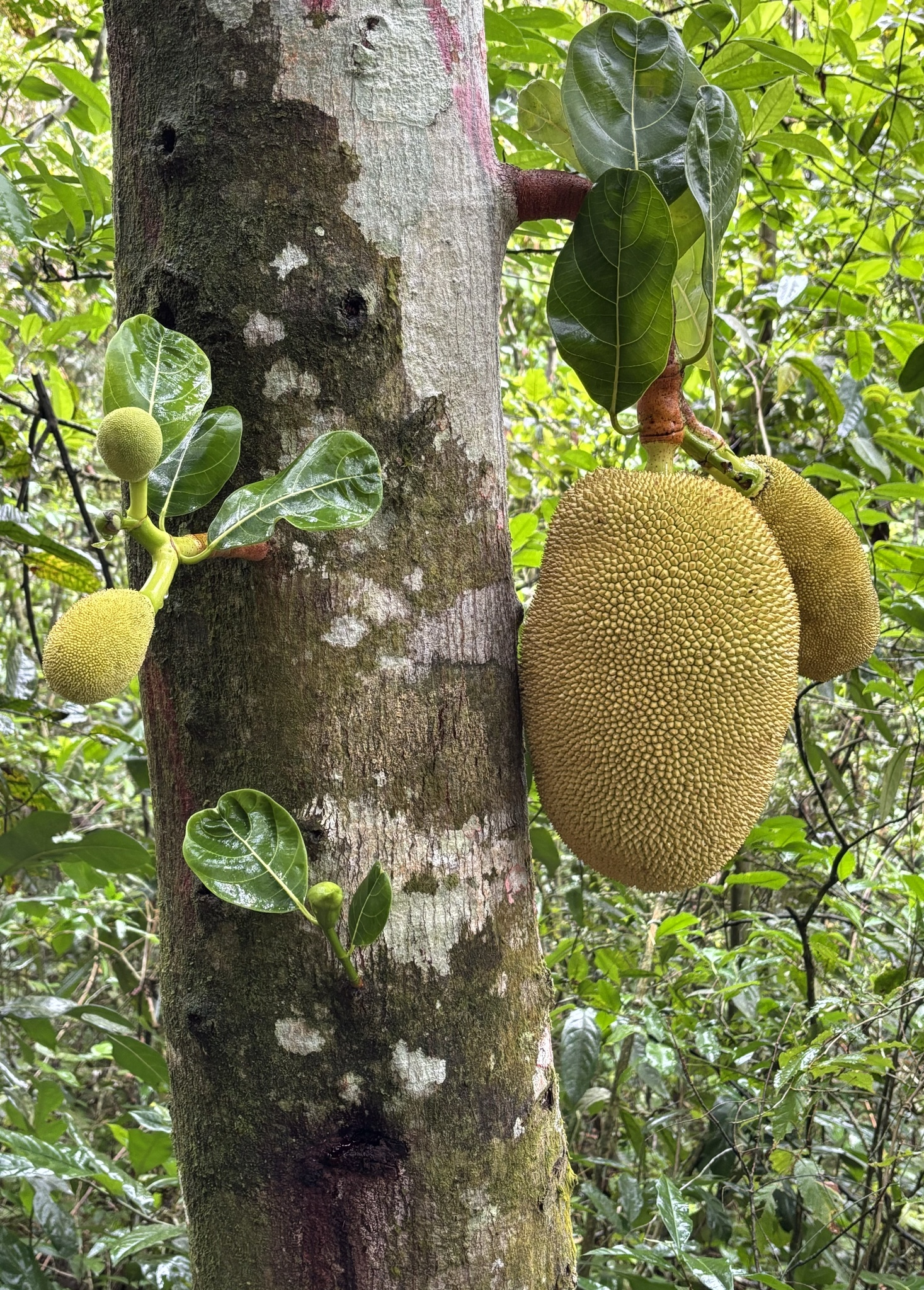
Jackfruit

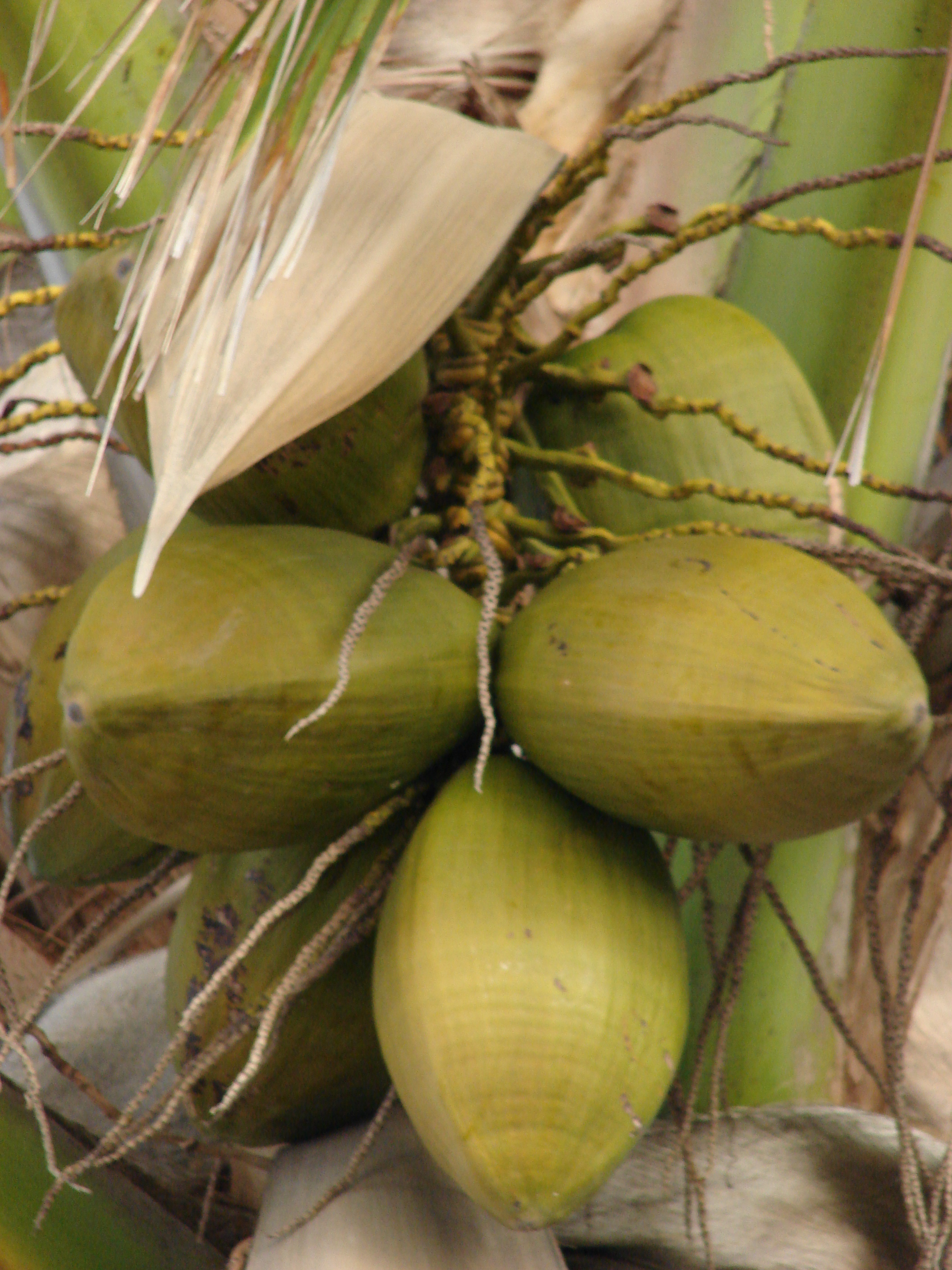
Coconut

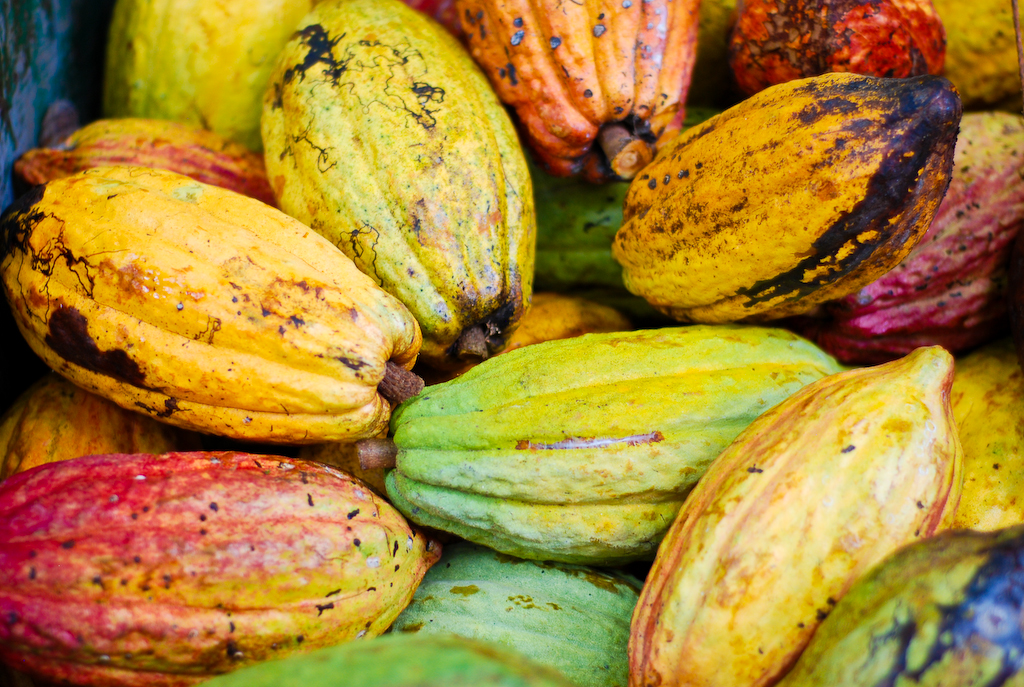
Cocoa— beans are dried, roasted and turned into chocolate balls for tea.

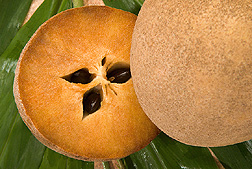
Naseberry

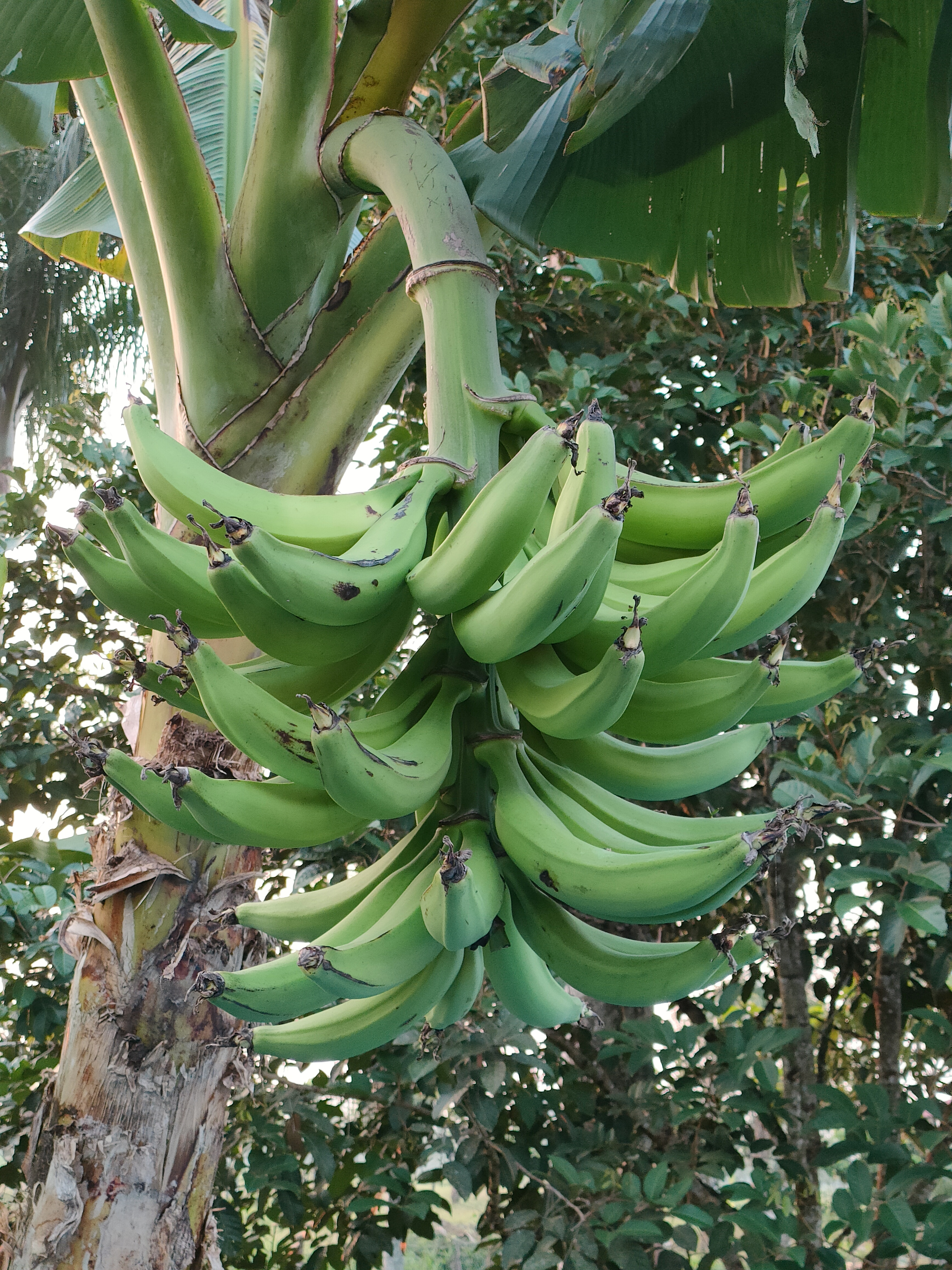
Plantain—green ones are used to make chips, porridge and tostones.

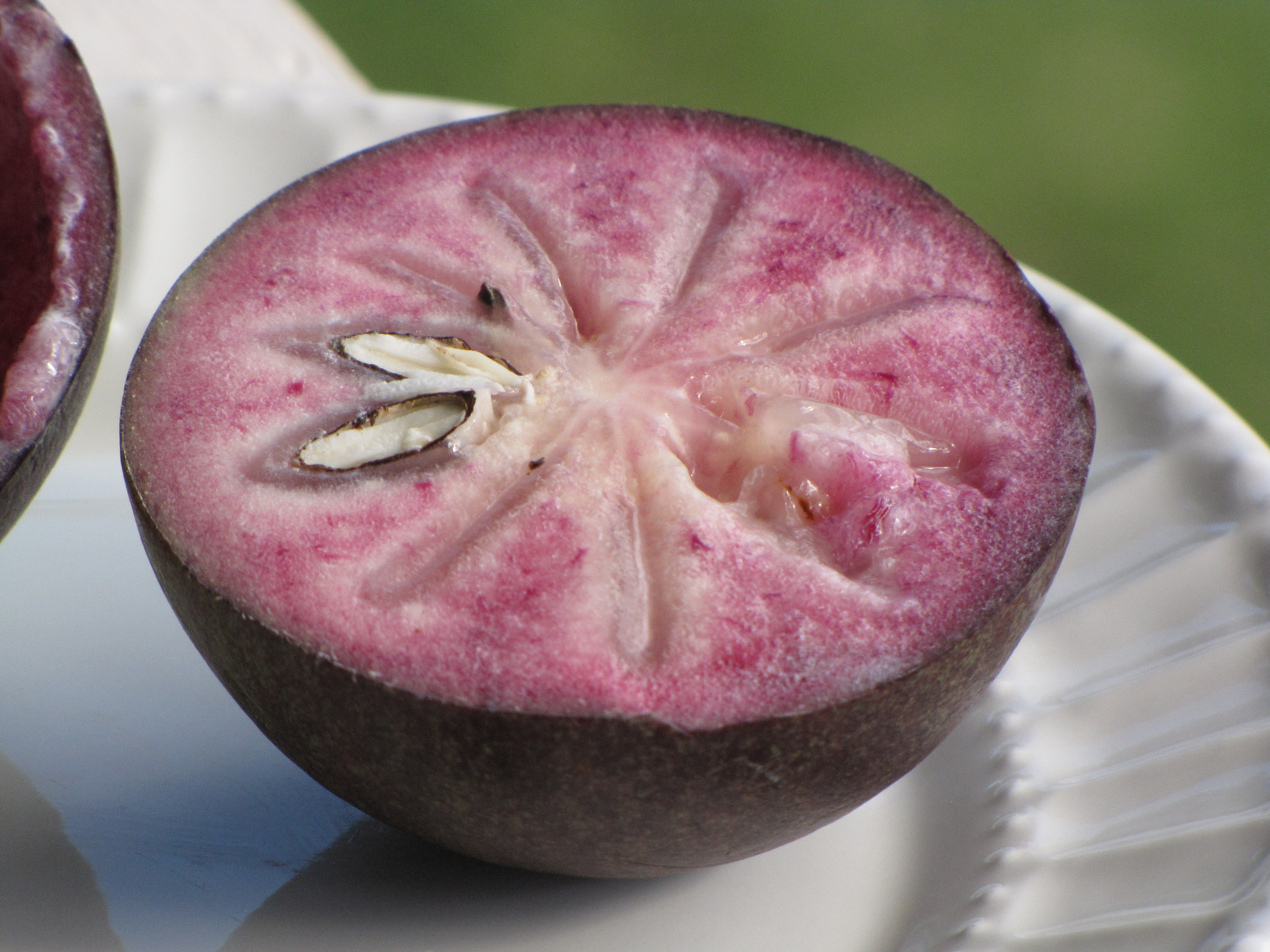
Starapple

== Desserts and sweets ==
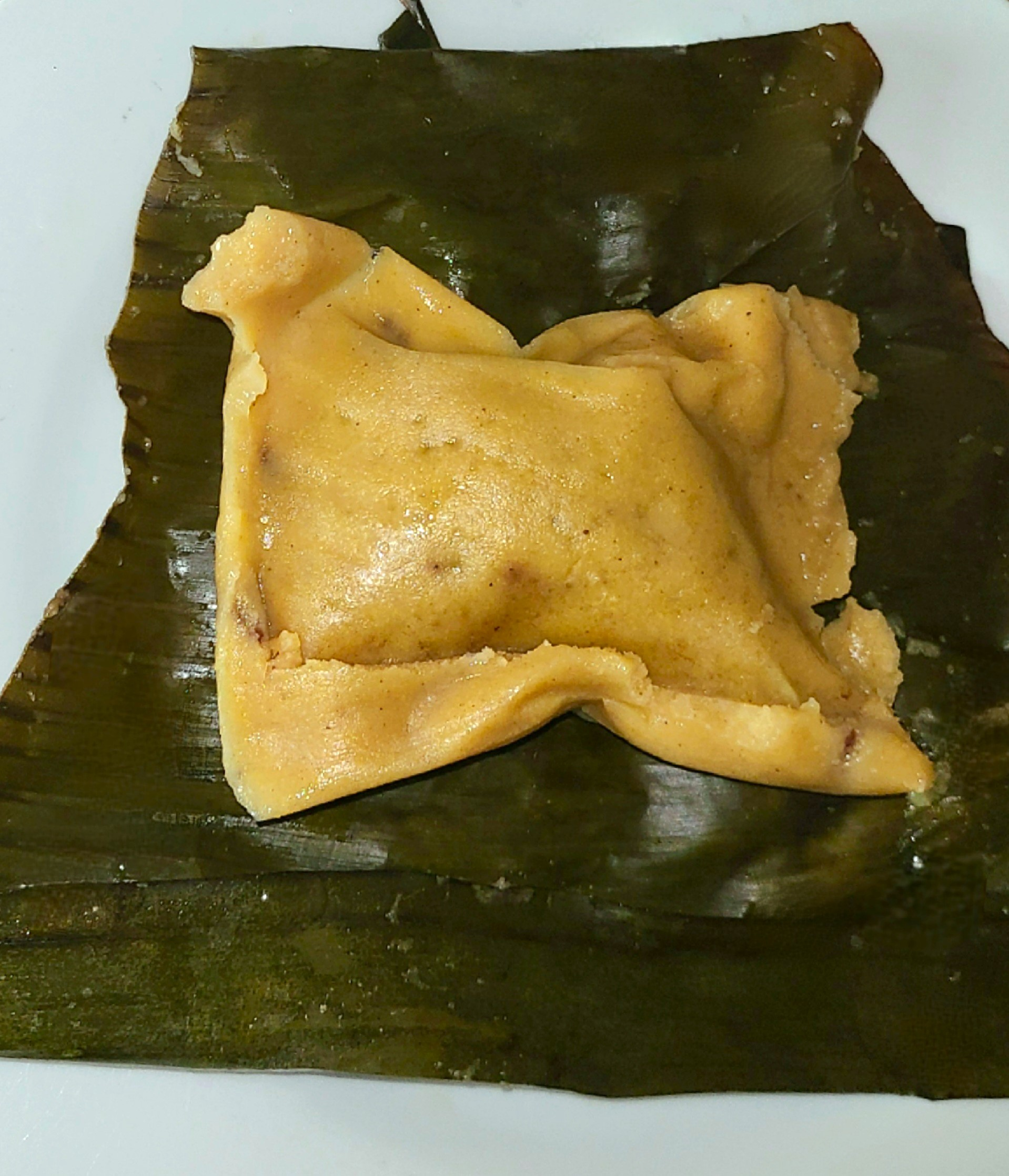
Blue drawers, tie-a-leaf or duckunoo.

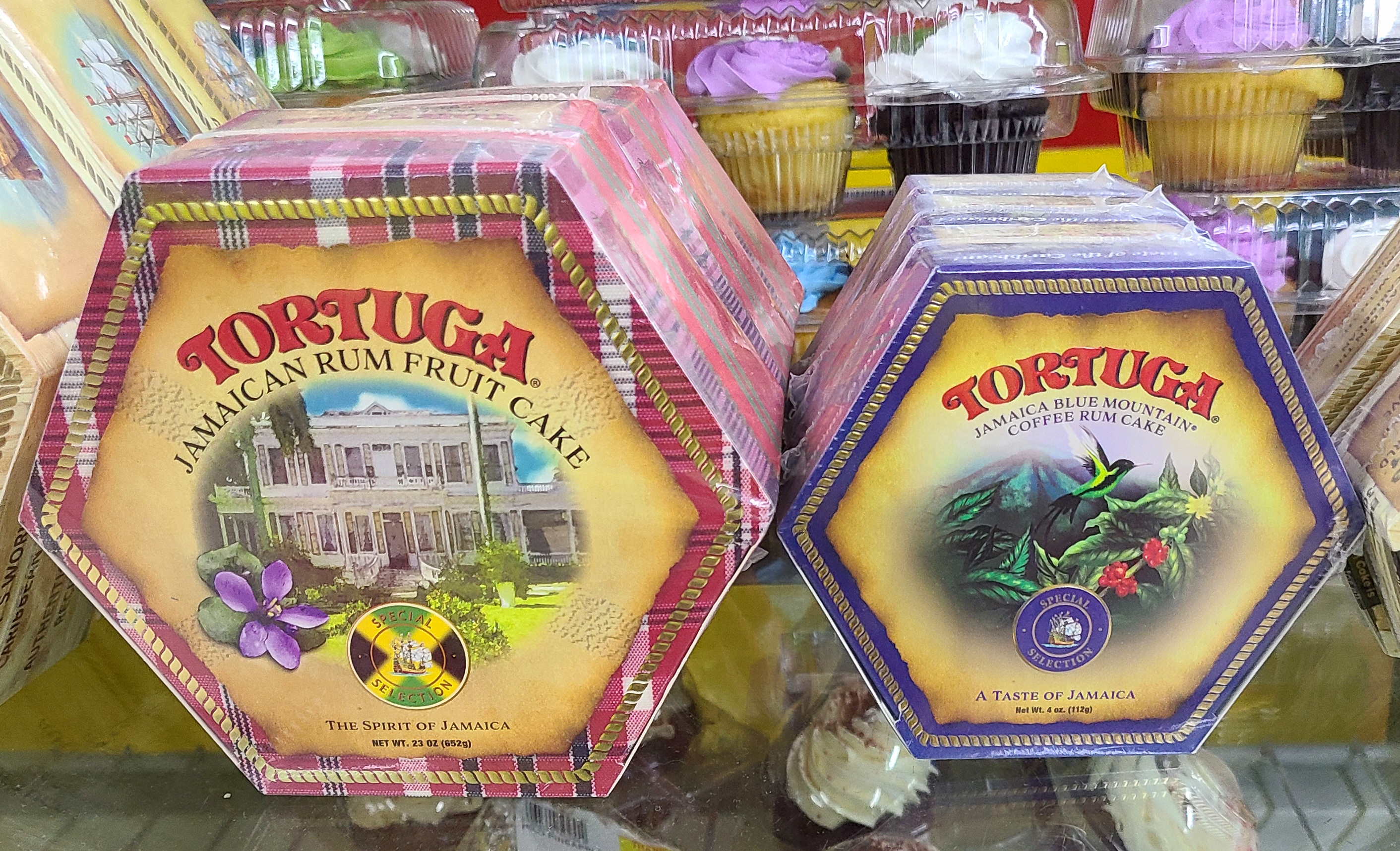
Rum cakes— flavours include fruit cake, coffee, golden, coconut, pineapple, banana and chocolate.

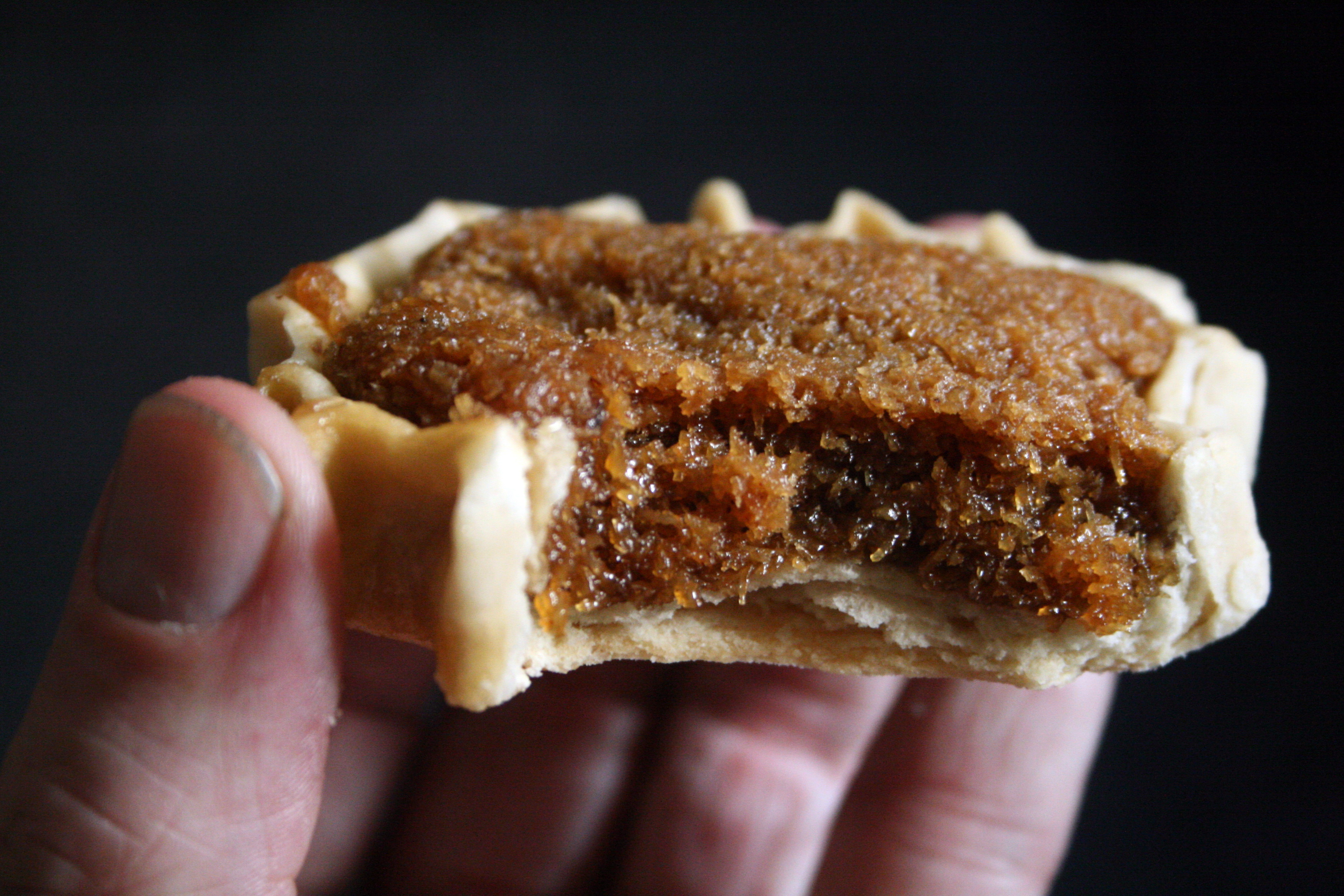
Gizzada

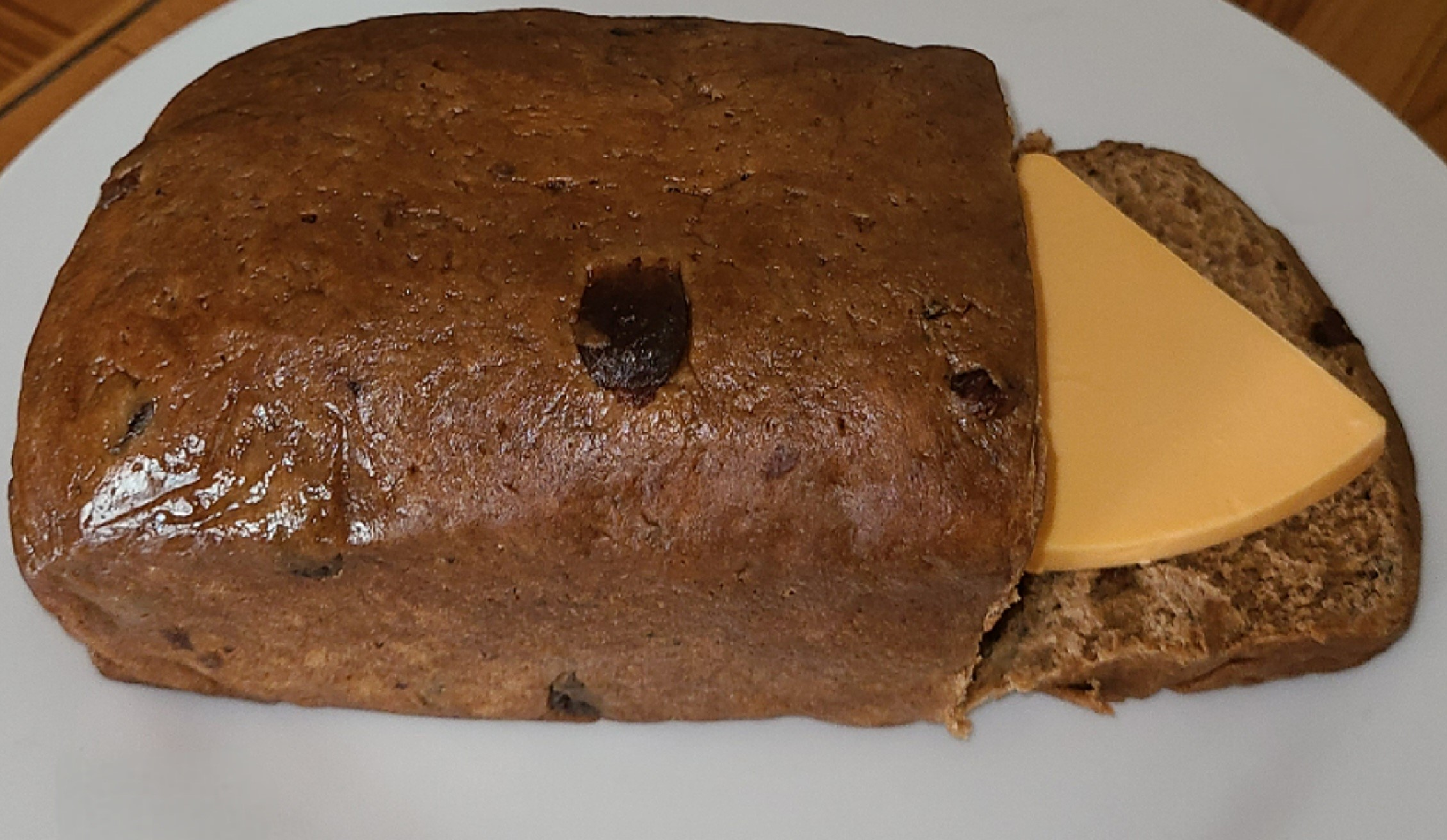
Spice bun and cheese

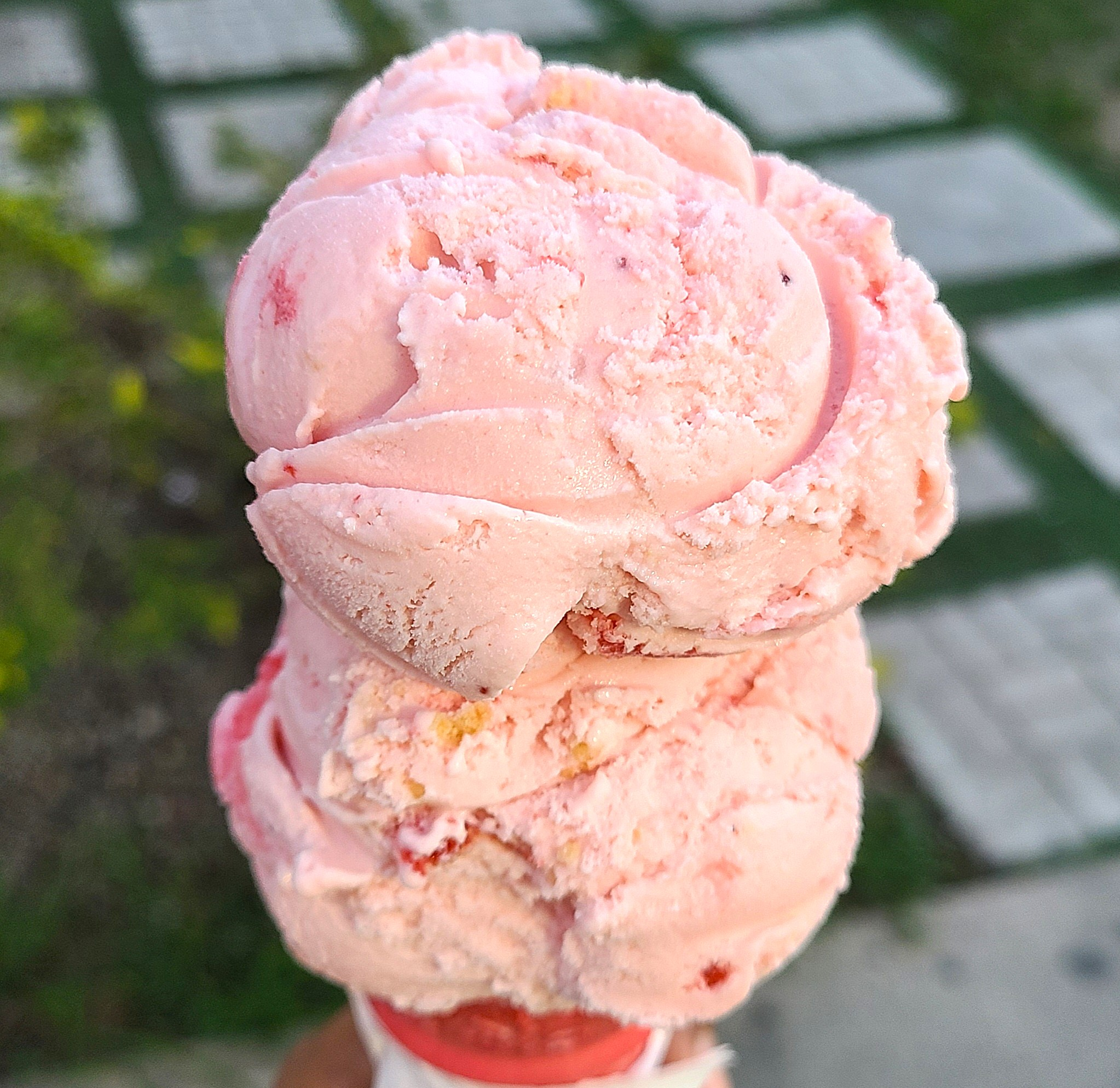
Devon House ice cream

- Asham
- Banana bread, cake or loaf
- Black Forest cake
- Blue drawers, also called tie-a-leaf, because it is cooked in tied banana leaves.
- Bread pudding
- Bulla cake
- Busta coconut sweets (Bustamante Backbone)
- Carrot cake
- Cassava pone
- Cheesecake (rum and raisin, strawberry, guava and rum cream)
- Cocktion
- Coconut drops
- Coconut macaroon
- Coconut roll (similar to cinnamon roll)
- Coffee cake
- Cornmeal pudding
- Devon House ice cream, available in a variety of flavours, but popular flavours include grape nut, rum and raisin, cookie & cream, coffee, pistachio, stout etc.
- Donuts
- Fruit cake, also called Christmas cake
- Gizzada, also called Pinch-Me-Round
- Grater cake
- Guava cheese
- Hummingbird cake
- Jackass corn
- Madeira cake
- Marble cake
- Peanut brittle
- Peanut drops / cake
- Pineapple cake
- Plain / Orange sponge cake
- Plantain tart
- Raisin bread
- Rock cake
- Rum cake
- Spice bun / Easter bun, a popular sweet loaf which sometimes includes raisins or fruits. Buns, especially small loafs or round ones, are eaten all year, while Easter bun is eaten during Easter.
- Sweet potato pudding
- Tamarind balls, tamarind fruit rolled into balls and lightly coated with sugar.
- Sugar bun
- Toto
- Twist donut

== Herbs, spices and condiments ==
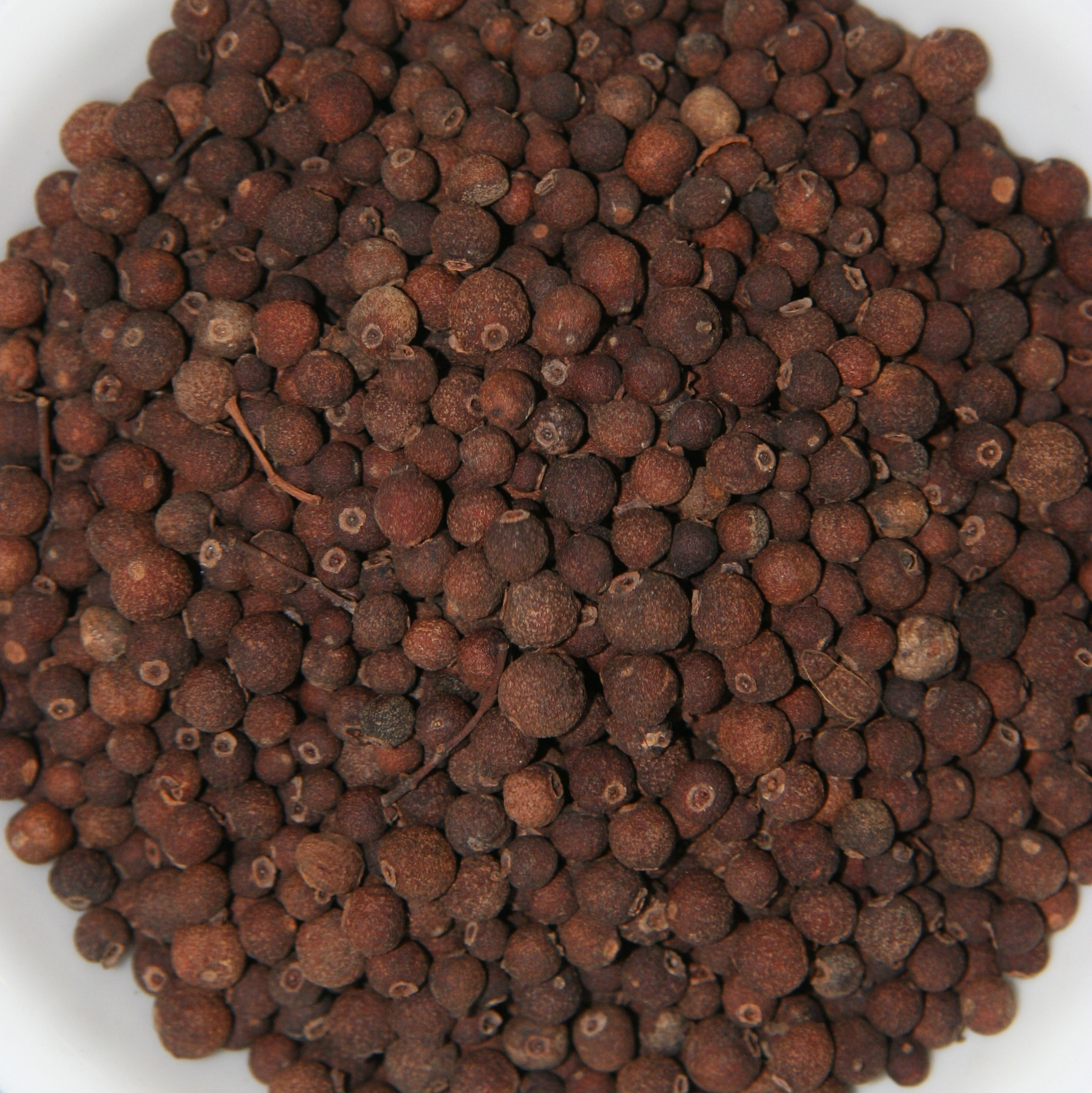
Pimento berries

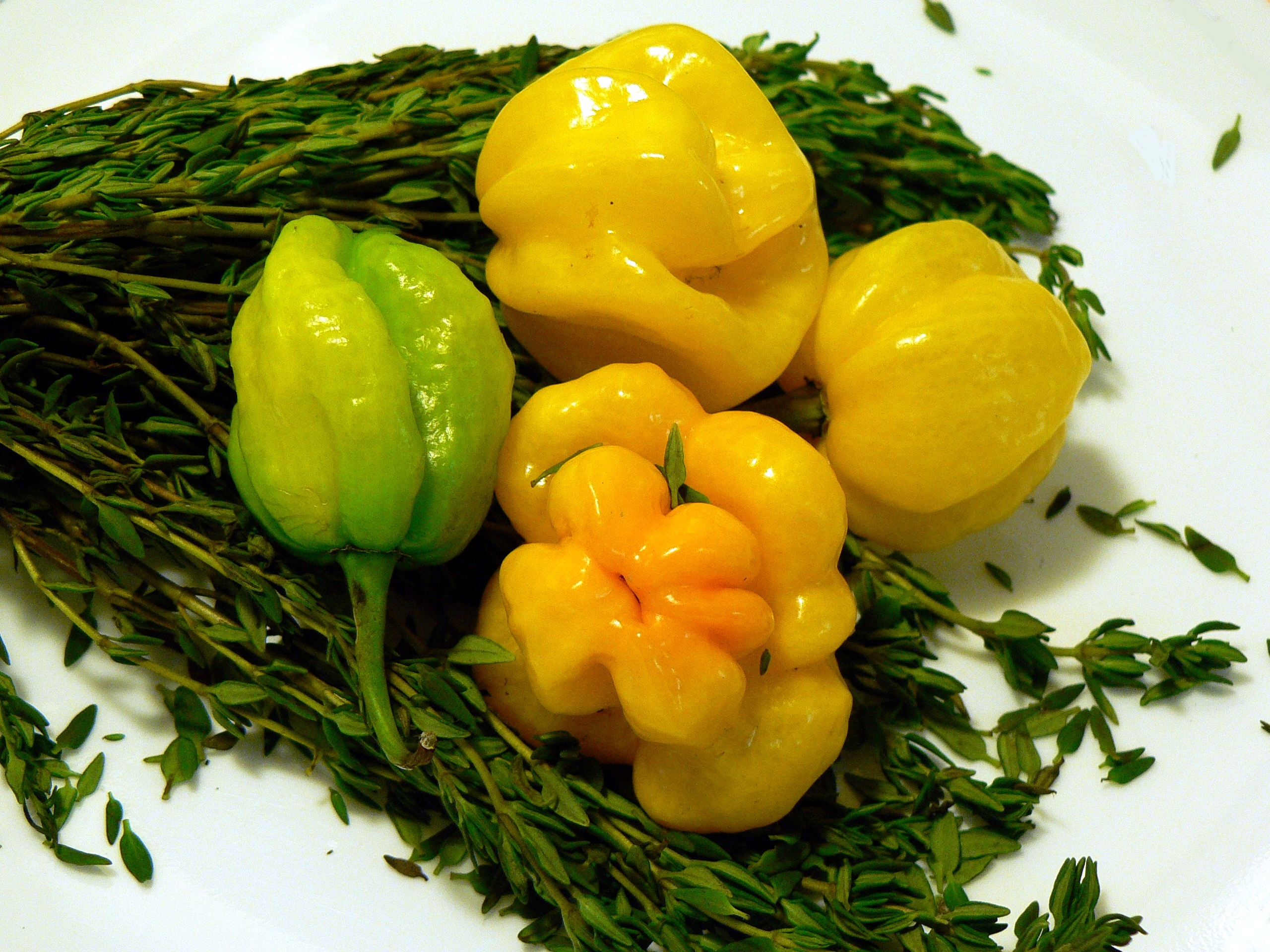
Scotch bonnet and thyme

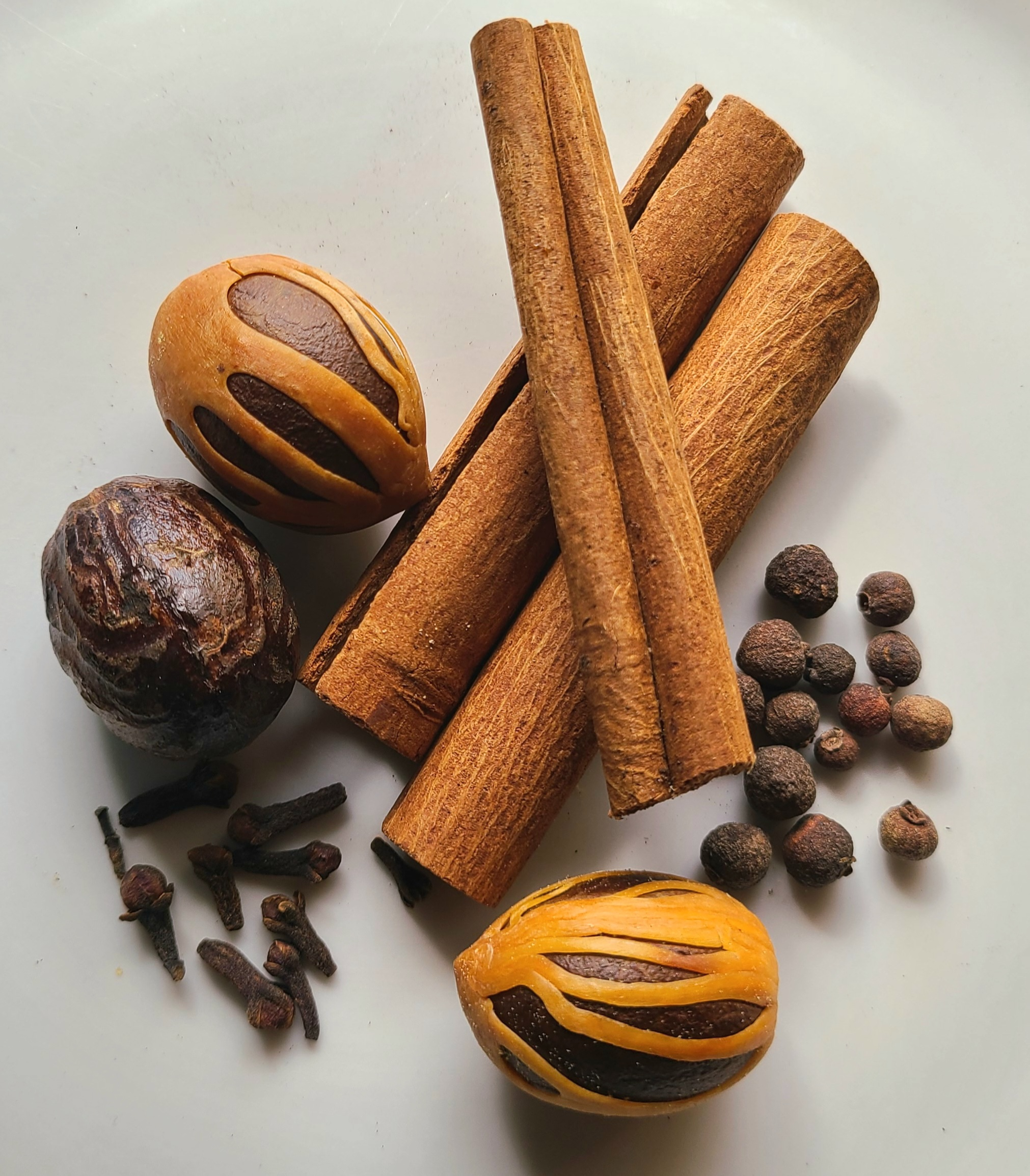
Cinnamon, nutmeg, cloves and pimento

- Allspice (known locally as pimento)
- Annatto
- Cayenne pepper
- Cinnamon
- Cloves
- Curry powder, Jamaican or Indian, which features a blend of turmeric, coriander, fenugreek, cumin, allspice, black pepper and cloves. Turmeric is the predominant spice and accounts for curry powder's yellow colour.
- Escallion
- Escovitch, made with vinegar, onion, scotch bonnet, pimento, carrot and chayote (cho cho). It is typically a seafood dressing.
- Garlic
- Green seasoning (a blend of local herbs and spices)
- Ginger
- Jamaican jerk spice, a blend of spices featuring allspice (pimento) and scotch bonnet.
- Jerk sauce
- Mixed spice (a powdered blend of cinnamon, nutmeg, anise, orange peel and / or cloves)
- Nutmeg
- Onion
- Pepper sauce (various)
- Pickapeppa sauce (usually made from small amounts of scotch bonnet pepper, and vinegar)
- Rosemary
- Scotch bonnet pepper
- Soya sauce
- Spanish thyme, also called French thyme
- Thyme
- Turmeric

== Soups ==
Soups play an important role in the Jamaican diet, not only as appetizers, but also as main lunch and dinner dishes, because they are hearty and filling. Jamaican soups consist of tubers and other staples (such as yam, sweet potato, white potato, breadfruit, Jamaican boiled dumplings or dasheen), and vegetables (such as carrot, okra and chayote), corn, pumpkin and meat. In Jamaica, soups are often prepared on Saturdays for dinner, but they may be eaten throughout the week or at special events. They are usually consumed alone, but may be served with hard dough bread or Jamaican water crackers. Soups are almost always served piping hot.

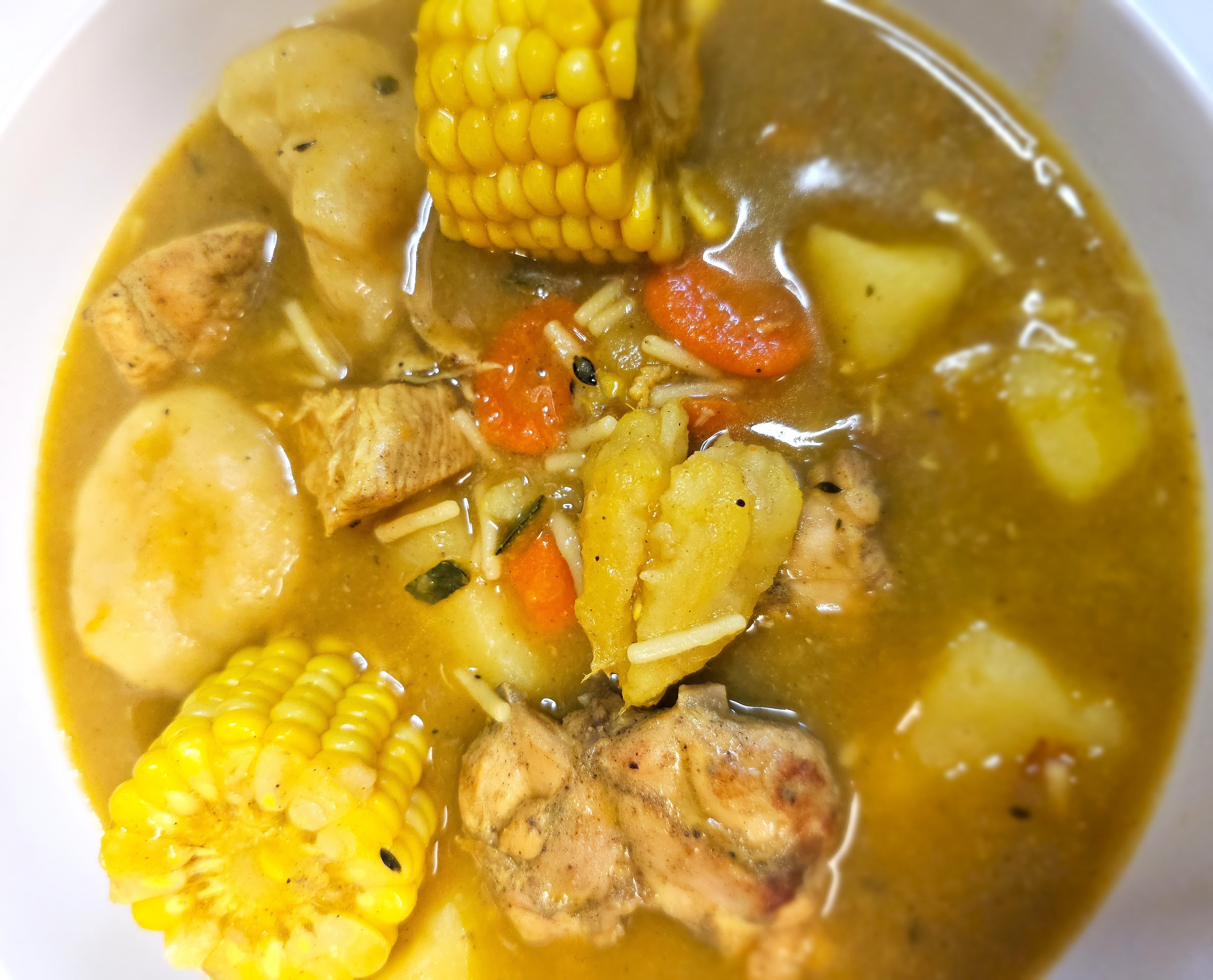
Jamaican chicken soup

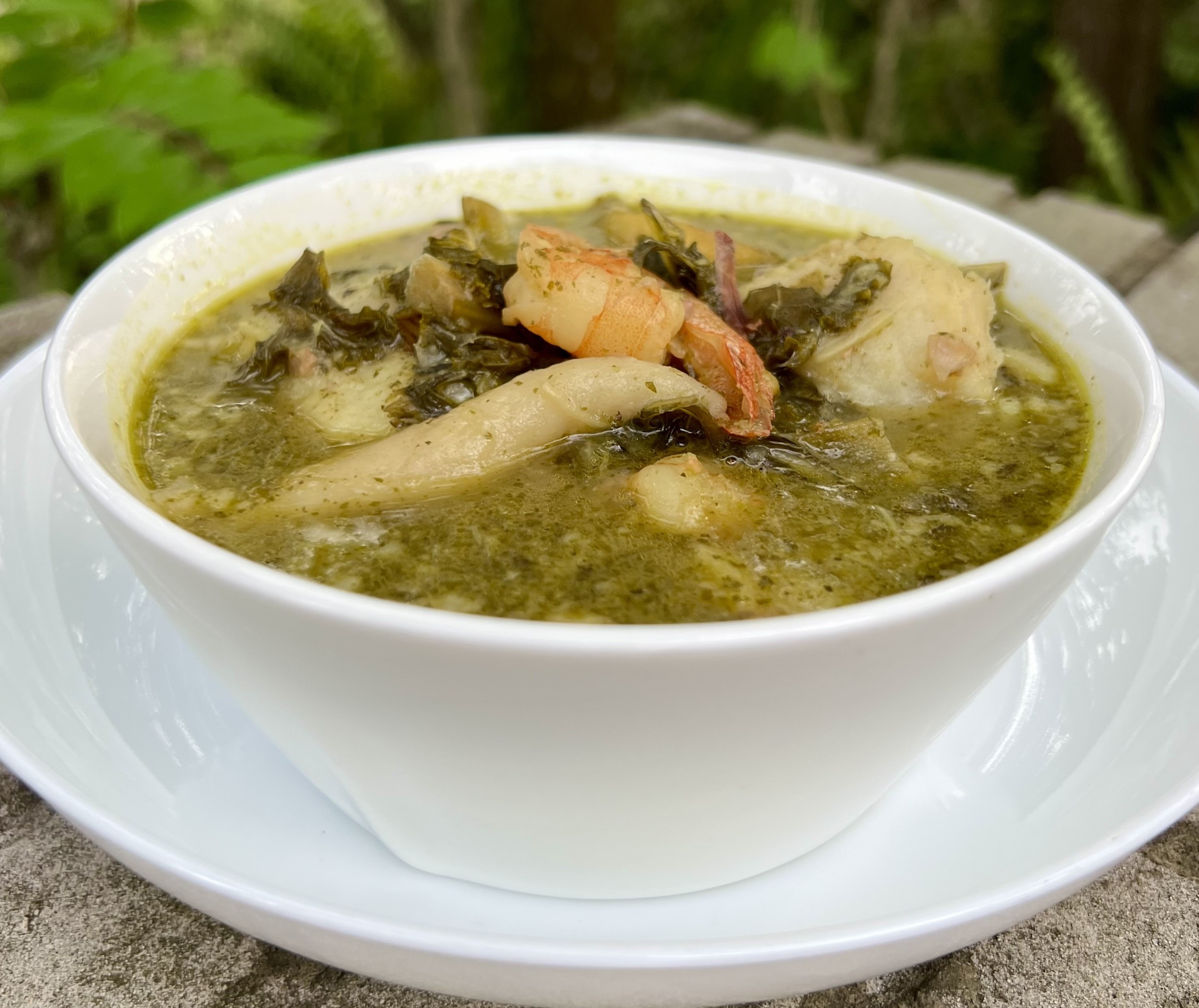
Jamaican pepperpot soup

- Busso (river snail) soup
- Chicken foot soup
- Chicken soup
- Conch soup
- Corn soup
- Crayfish (janga) soup
- Cow cod soup
- Cow skin soup
- Fish tea
- Gungo peas soup, made with pigeon peas (locally known as "gungo peas")
- Mannish water (goat soup)
- Mutton soup
- Pepperpot soup
- Pumpkin soup, made with pumpkin or butternut squash, chicken, chayote (locally known as "cho cho"), and various other vegetables depending on the region.
- Red peas soup, made with kidney beans, pigstail, beef or chicken, tubers such as coco, yam, potato and sweet potato, vegetables and spices.
- Saturday soup (beef soup)

== Beverages ==
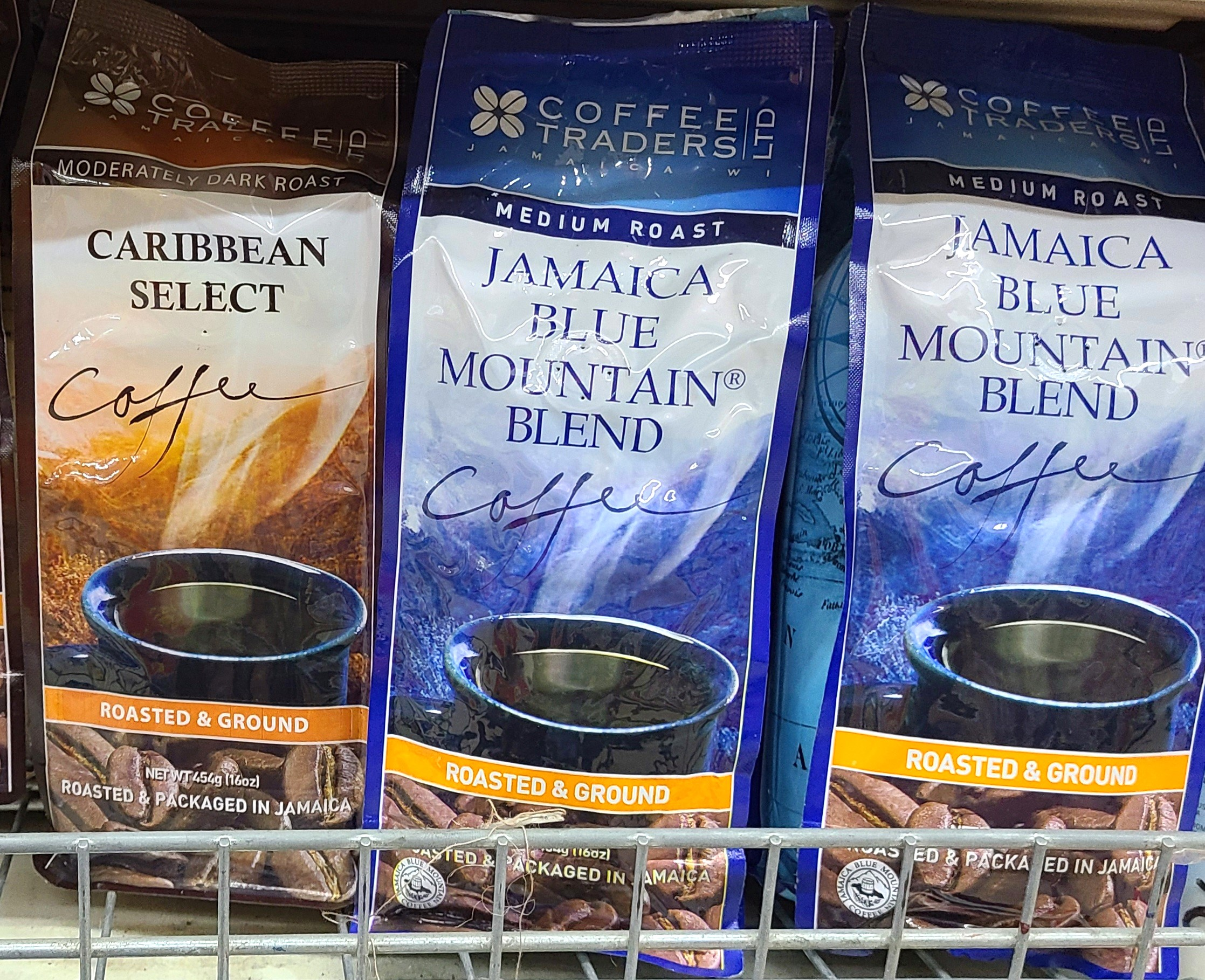
Jamaican Blue Mountain coffee

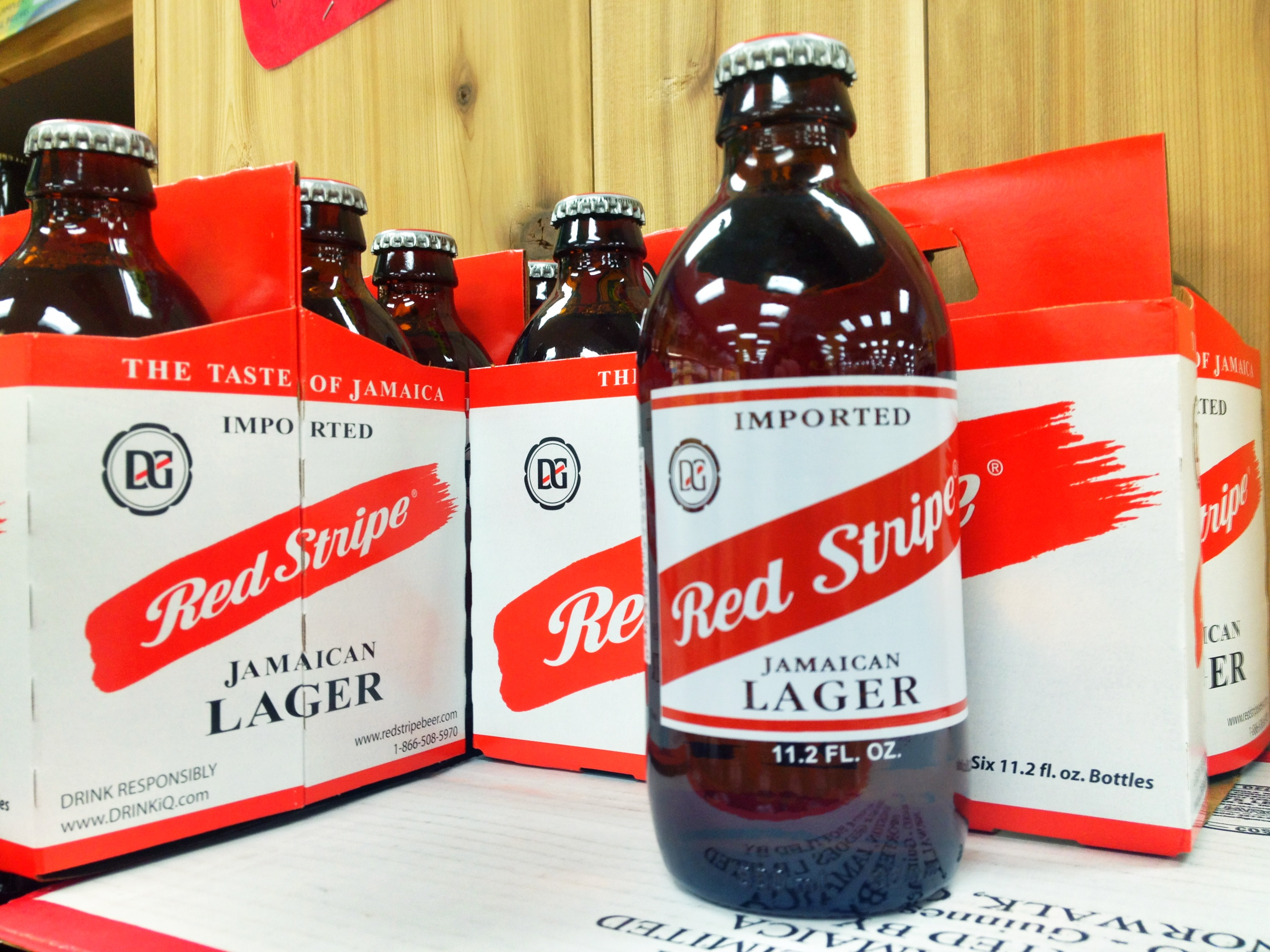
Red Stripe beer

=== Hot beverages ===
Most Jamaicans begin the morning with a hot drink, either alone, with Jamaican tough water crackers, bread or along with a breakfast dish.

- Chocolate tea (Hot chocolate), traditionally made from chocolate balls.
- Herbal teas can be made using packaged tea bags, but are almost always brewed from fresh local herbs. Ginger, lemongrass and mint are commonly consumed. These are the most popular types of beverages served with breakfast dishes.
- Jamaican Blue Mountain Coffee
- LASCO Food Drinks (Lasco Jamaica)— instant food drinks made by adding hot or cold water to powdered mixture. Flavours include vanilla, creamy malt, soy, peanut punch, carrot, almond, orange-pineapple etc.

=== Juices and cold beverages ===
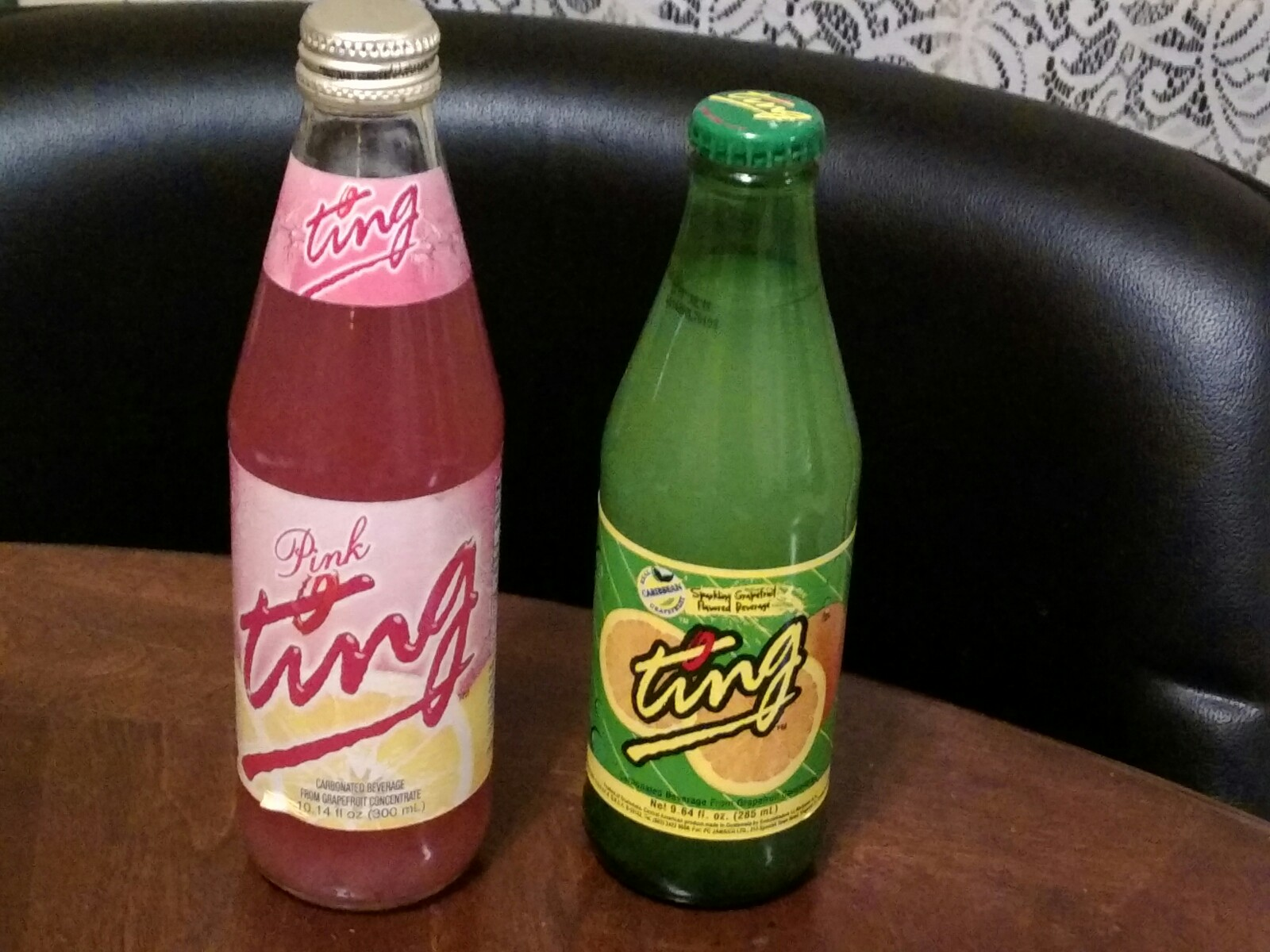
Ting (soft drink)

Juices often include local fruits such as pineapple, Otaheite apple, June plum (Tahitian apple), acerola cherry, mango and guava, or a combination of fruits to make medleys such as guava-carrot, pineapple-cherry and fruit punch. Most homemade Jamaican fruit juices usually contain a little ginger and / or lime.

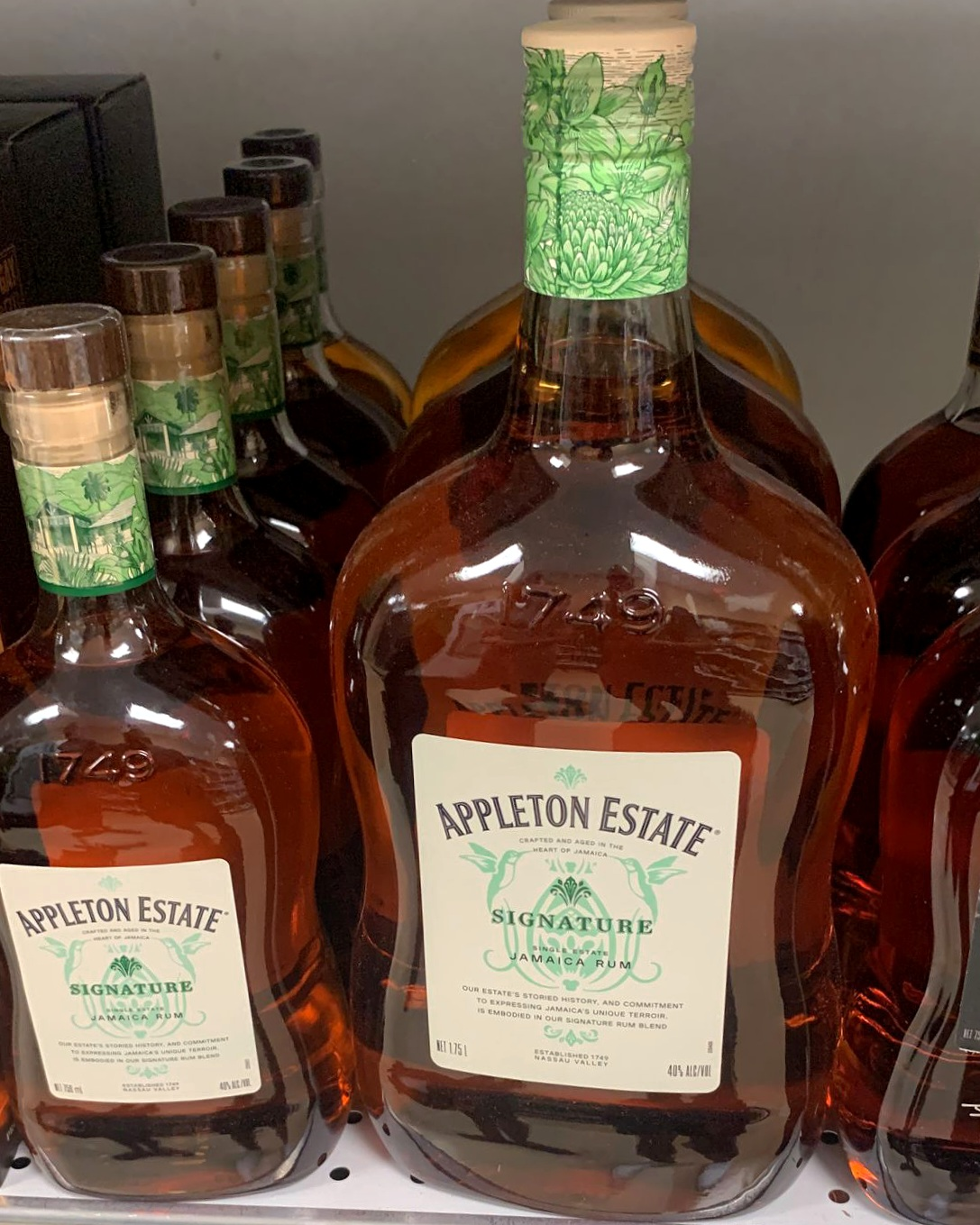
Jamaican rum

- Coffee drinks
- Coconut water
- Eggnog
- Ginger beer
- Irish Moss
- Jamaican rum
- Malta (regular, coffee and vanilla)
- Red Stripe beer
- Rum cream (flavours include coffee, banana, rum and raisin, chocolate, coconut and banana)
- Rum punch
- Soft drinks such as cream soda, cola champagne and other flavours; Bigga; D&G and Ting.
- Sorrel (drink), made from Jamaican sorrel (roselle), is enjoyed all year round, but is especially consumed as a Christmas drink. White rum or wine is often added at Christmas. Jamaican sorrel has become a popular beverage in Latin America, known as agua de Jamaica, flor de Jamaica or simply Jamaica.
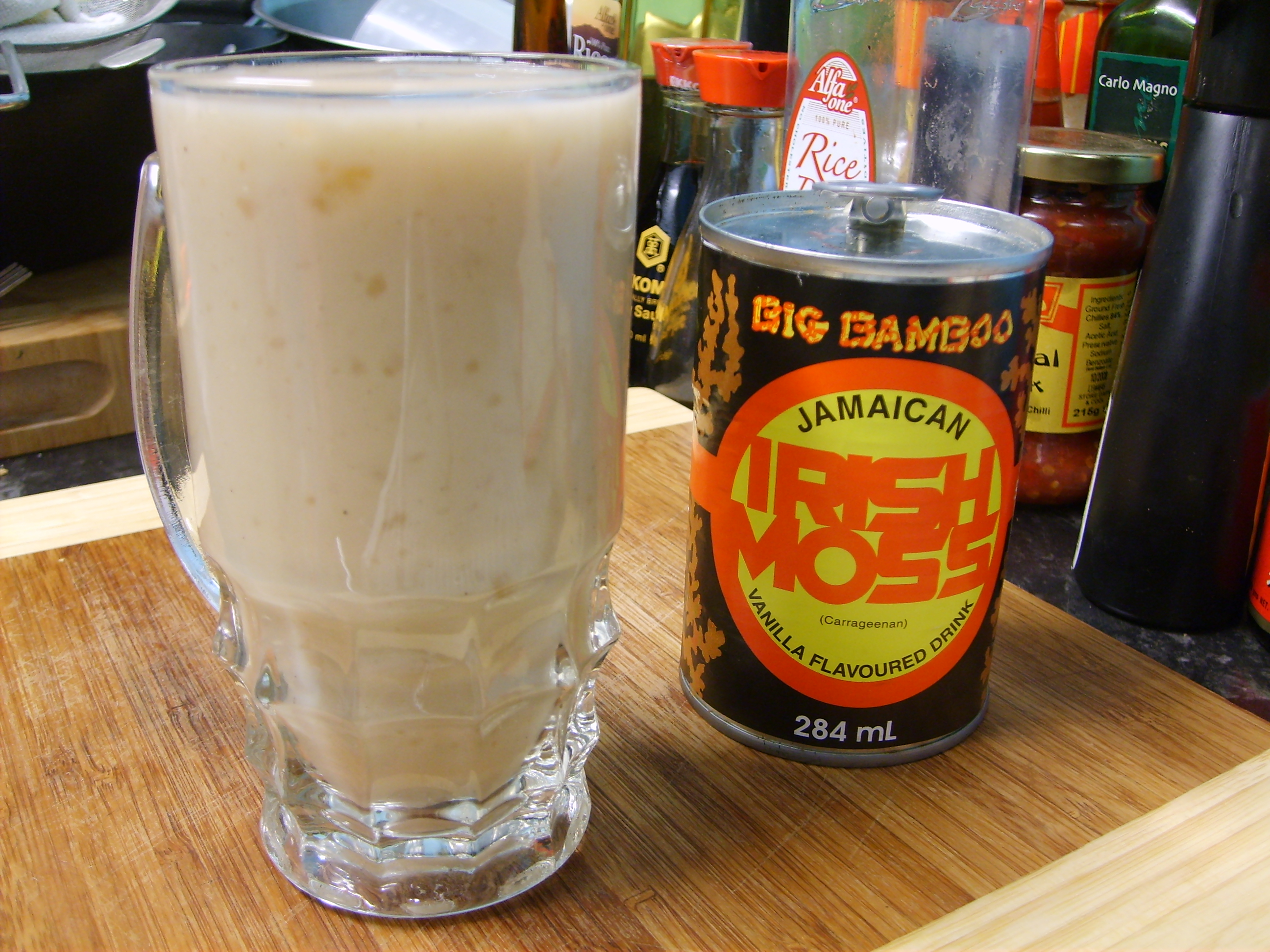
Irish Moss

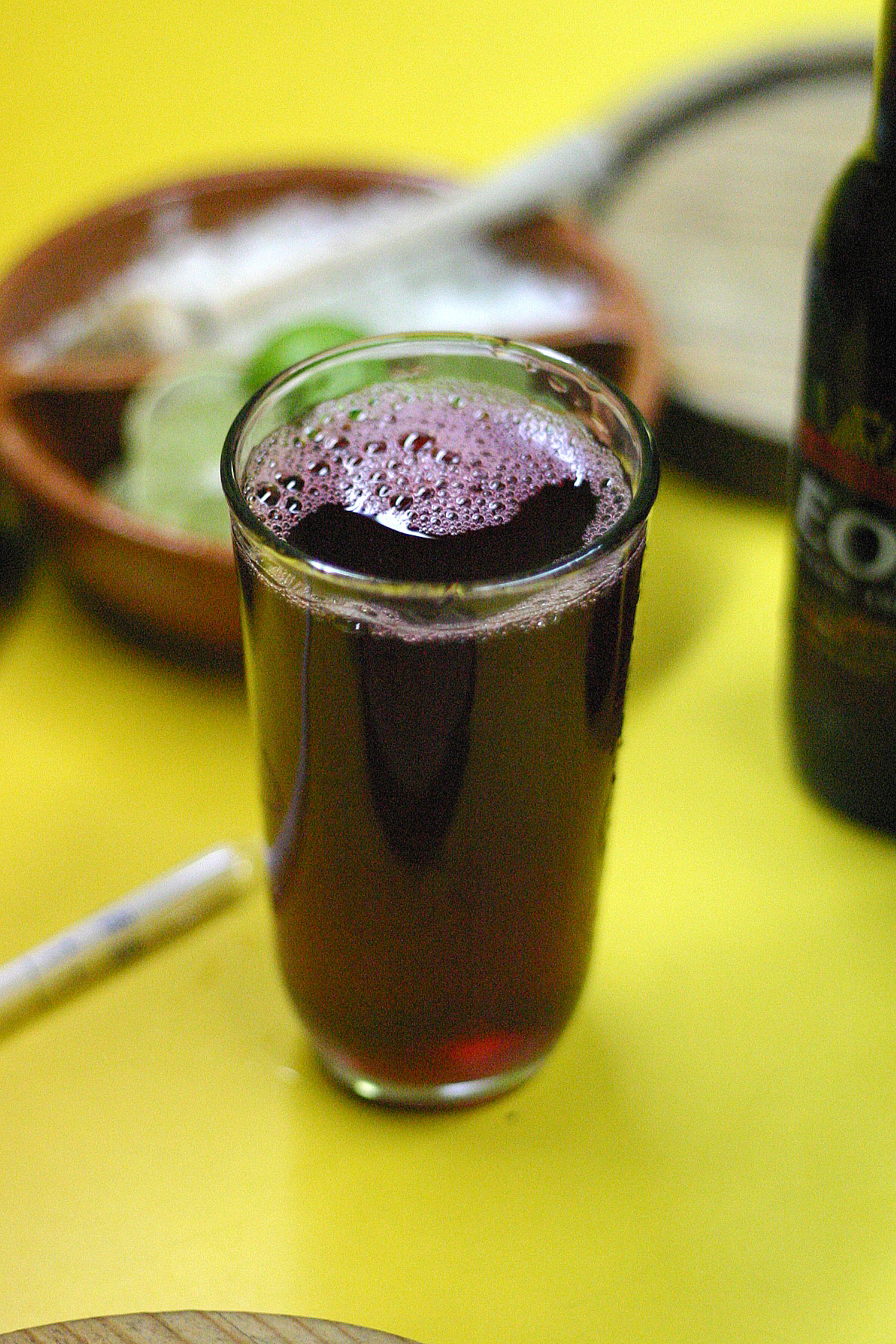
Sorrel

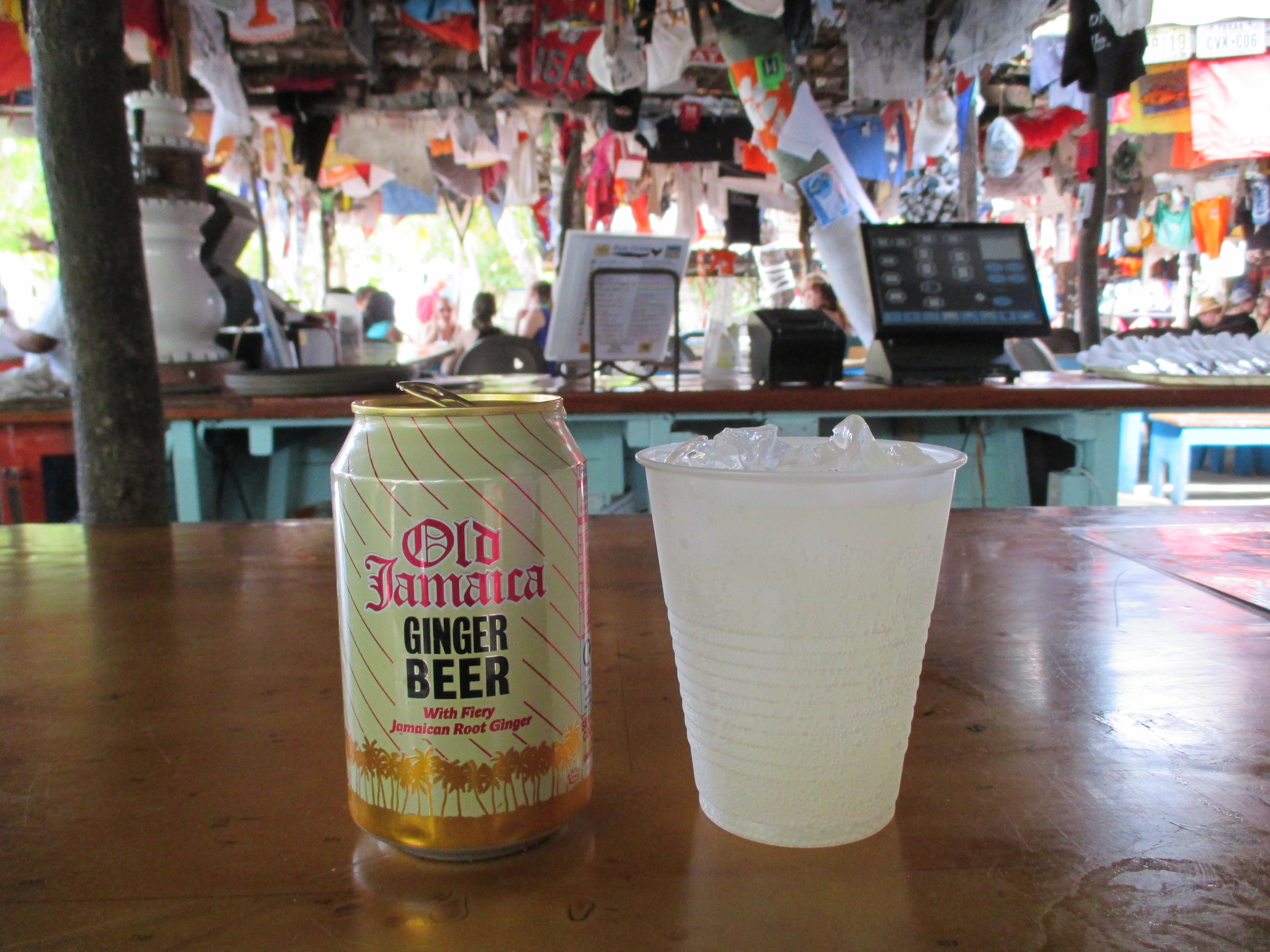
Ginger beer

== See also ==
- List of street foods – Jamaica
- Outline of Jamaica
