= Golden Krust =

American fast food chain and manufacturer of Caribbean cuisine

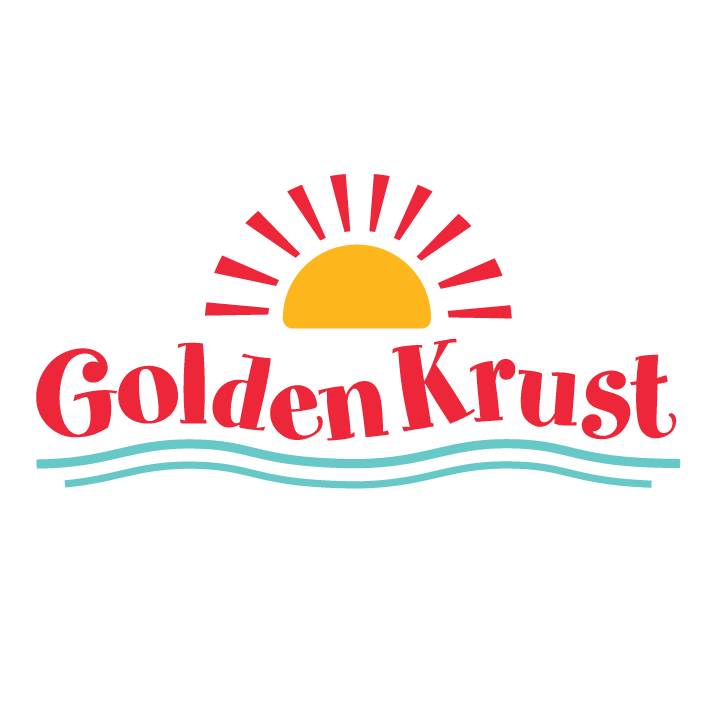
- Type: Private
- Industry: Restaurant
- Founded: 1989; 37 years ago The Bronx, New York City, United States
- Founders: Lowell Hawthorne and family
- Headquarters: 3958 Park Avenue, Bronx, NY 10457
- Number of locations: 100
- Area served: United States
- Key people: Jacqueline Hawthorne (CEO)
- Products: Jamaican food, Jamaican patty, Caribbean cuisine, Baked goods, Jerk chicken, Oxtail
- Website: goldenkrust.com

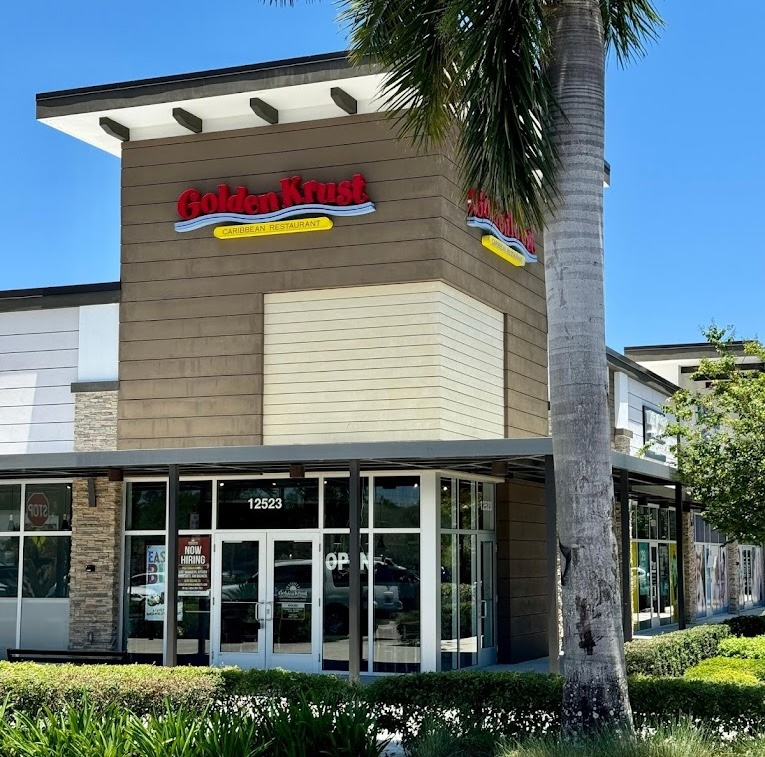
The exterior of a Golden Krust Caribbean Restaurant in Miramar, Florida

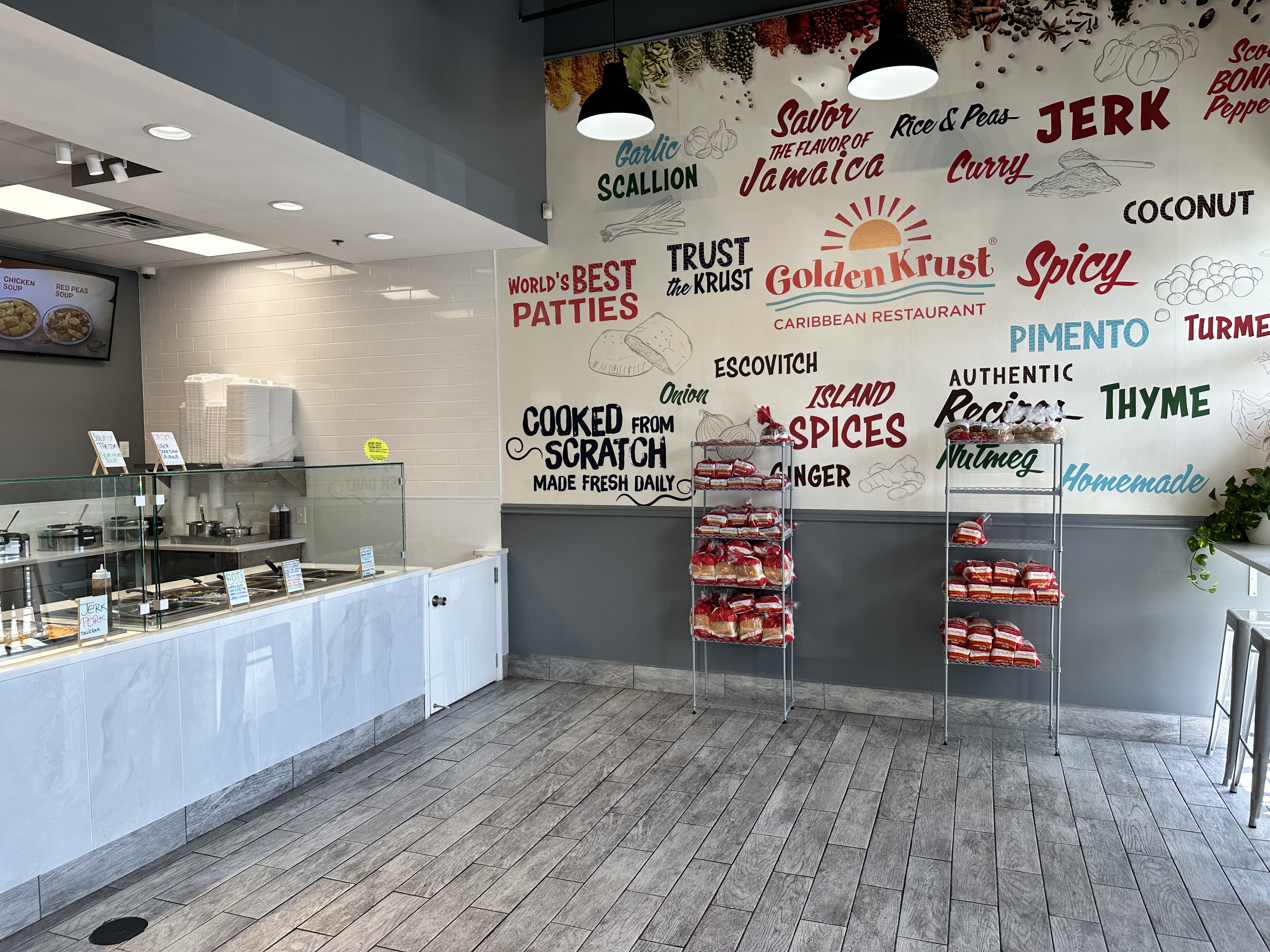
The interior of a Golden Krust Caribbean Restaurant

Golden Krust Caribbean Bakery, Inc. is a Caribbean fast casual restaurant operator and manufacturer of Caribbean cuisine including Jamaican food, Jamaican patty, and other baked goods.

The parent company is owned by the Hawthorne family, and the stores are franchised. There are over 100 Golden Krust restaurants operating in eight U.S. states: New York, New Jersey, Connecticut, Georgia, Florida, Maryland, North Carolina, and Texas. The majority of the restaurants are situated in New York. It is New York City's largest locally owned restaurant chain.

The company also distributes food products to retailers, schools and prisons, is considered the foremost Jamaican business in the U.S. and was featured on the CBS reality television show Undercover Boss in 2016.

== History ==
Golden Krust started as a bakery in 1949 built by Mavis and Ephraim Hawthorne in Saint Andrew, Jamaica, that served family recipes. Their son Lowell Hawthorne, Golden Krust's former President and CEO, and his siblings opened the first U.S. restaurant in 1989 on Gun Hill Road in the Bronx. To open, the Hawthorne family, according to Business Opportunities Journal pooled $107,000, "using the Jamaican concept of susu, whereby everyone pitched in $100 a week to raise start-up money after banks refused them a loan."

Hawthorne came to New York in 1981 and graduated from Bronx Community College, before working as an accountant with the New York City Police Department for nine years. As of 2005, nine brothers and sisters are involved in the family business.

In 2011, Golden Krust introduced a frozen microwavable Jamaican patty. In the ensuing years, the line of frozen patties (which now includes Spicy Beef, Mild Beef, Chicken, Jerk Chicken, Beyond Meat Spicy Beef, Beyond Meat Mild Beef) has expanded to reach over 20,000 grocery stores across the country from stores such as Walmart, Target, Publix, Costco, and more. In 2025, Golden Krust launched a new sub-brand exclusively for Walmart called 'Island Select'.

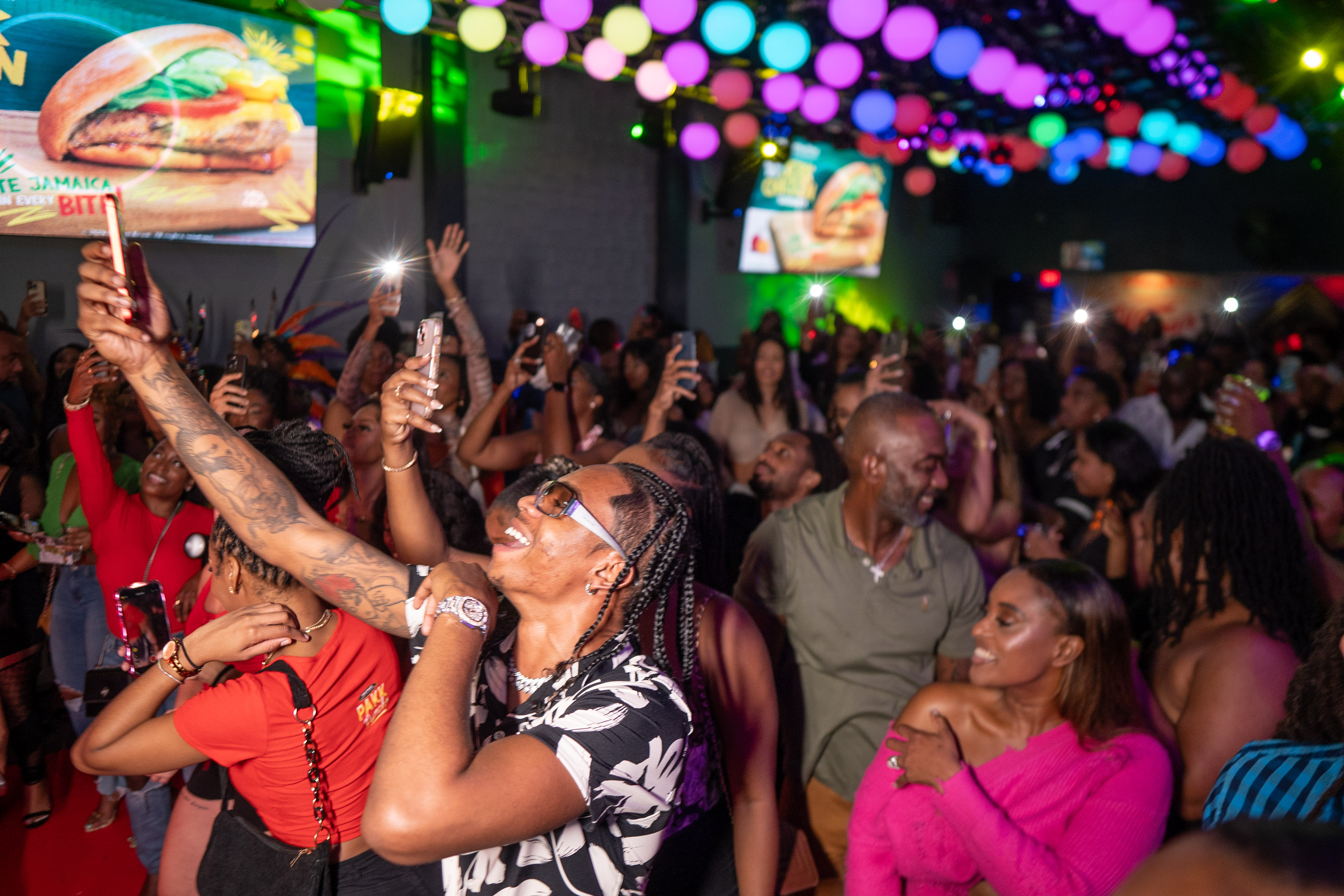
A vibrant Golden Krust National Jamaican Patty Day tour event filled with guests enjoying food, drinks, and music.

In 2015, Golden Krust created the inaugural National Jamaican Patty Day, celebrating the rich history of the Caribbean treat. What started out as a singular celebration at the original Golden Krust location on Gun Hill Road in the Bronx turned into a multi-state tour of events and promotions. These events have included appearances from Wayne Wonder, Kranium, Major Seven, Jesse Royal, Tifa, and Nigy Boy.

Lowell Hawthorne passed away unexpectedly on December 2, 2017, aged 57. His death was mourned by many including former employees, colleagues and Jamaican Prime Minister Andrew Holness. Hawthorne was previously featured on the CBS reality television show Undercover Boss (Season 7, Episode 12) in 2016.

In August 2024, Jacqueline Hawthorne-Robinson, sister of Founder Lowell Hawthorne, was announced as the new Chief Executive Officer of Golden Krust. She would announce in December of 2025 a plan to open 50 new restaurants in the next 5 years.

In July 2025, Golden Krust opened their first location in an airport, with Terminal 8 of JFK hosting the first-of-its-kind location.

In 2025, the MTA announced it would be phasing out the metro card. Golden Krust was one of a handful of local brands that partnered with the MTA to promote the end of the iconic public transit card.

In May 2026, Golden Krust launched a new E-commerce store, which for the first time allows customers to order Bakery items (Hard Dough Bread, Wheat Bread, Bulla Cake, Tutti Frutti, Spice Bun, and Round Bun) and branded merchandise directly to their homes.

== Menu ==
Their restaurants serve Caribbean classics such as Braised Oxtail, Jerk Chicken, Curried Chicken and Goat, Brown Stew Chicken, Rice & Peas, Acklee & Saltfish, and an array of Jamaican Patties.

In 1998 the company produced 25 million flaky burnt-orange patties on assembly lines at its main facility. The restaurants do a lot of take-out business, as the patties are portable, and also distributes to supermarkets in 30 states. Offerings include beef patty, vegetable patty, spicy beef and cheese patty, soy patty, oxtail, curried goat, brown stew chicken, roti filled with curried meat or vegetables, and "coco" bread.

== Community engagement ==
In 2025, Jamaica was devastated by Hurricane Melissa. In the aftermath, Golden Krust stepped up to help those in need on the island. A corporate initiative raised over $250,000 in money and goods. Corporate additionally visited the island to delivery materials in person and meet with farmers who were directly impacted that the brand supported with money and goods. Local franchisees also took it upon themselves to visit the island and give back to those impacted.

Golden Krust celebrated its 35th anniversary in 2025. To show appreciation to the communities that made that tenure possible, 35 charitable events and donations were made across the country, including to The Children’s Rescue Fund, Bridge to Hope, Community Help in Park Slope (Chips), Second Helpings Atlanta, City Harvest (NY), Feeding Westchester, Hands on Hartford, Carolina Cares, Houston Food Bank, Blythedale Children’s Hospital, Migrant Kitchen Initiative, Coconut Grove Food Pantry, Feeding Tampa Bay, Chase Young’s Free Youth Football Camp, UP Orlando, Mend NJ, and more. In all, nearly 20,000 meals or 7 tons of food were donated.

== Operations ==
The restaurants do mostly take-out and have limited seating. The decor has evolved from bright “sunny” yellow and orange tiles to a grey interior with white subway tile, wood accents, a Cooked from Scratch, Made Fresh Daily wall, and an accent wall that features ingredients utilized in the restaurant's food preparation.

The Hawthornes hope to add the Jamaican patty to the list of American ethnic fast foods alongside the Italian pizza slice, Jewish bagel, and the Chinese noodle. The company uses a rising sun logo and has a city contract to serve lunches to prison inmates and schoolchildren.

== In popular culture ==
The chain was featured on the U.S. version of Undercover Boss in episode 12 of season 7 in 2016.

In 2025, The Today Show aired a segment called "The King of Queens" which featured hosts Al Roker and Mike Tirico visiting a Golden Krust location in Jamaica, Queens. The two sampled Jamaican Patties on air.

The brand has been featured in collaborations with or social media posts including: Lizzo, DJ Khaled, Aljamain Sterling, Jordan Burroughs, Sanya Richards-Ross, and Chase Young.
