= Peg bread =

Jamaican and West Indian bread

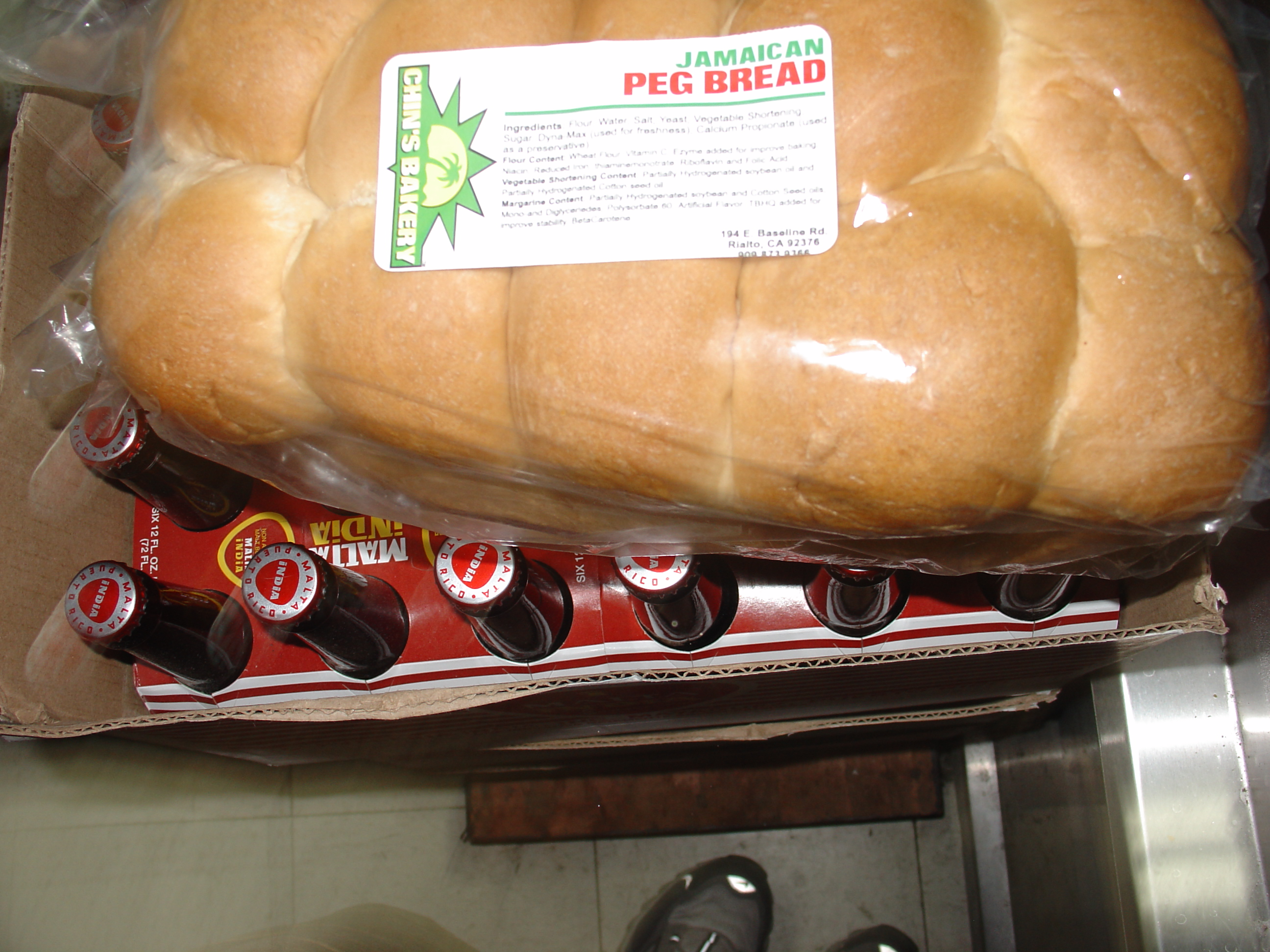
- Peg bread sold at a Los Angeles market
- Type: Bread
- Place of origin: Jamaica and West Indies

Peg bread is a traditional Jamaican and West Indian bread type. It is usually served along with tea in the morning.

== See also ==
- Rye bread
- Coco bread
- Hard dough bread
- List of Jamaican dishes
- Rock cake
