= Coco bread =

Caribbean bread made with coconut milk

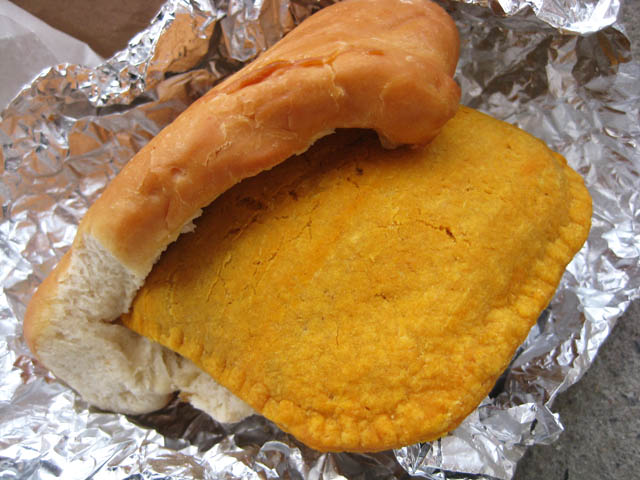
- Coco bread stuffed with a Jamaican patty
- Type: Bread
- Place of origin: Jamaica
- Region or state: Caribbean
- Serving temperature: Hot or room temperature
- Main ingredients: Flour, dairy milk or coconut milk, baker's yeast, sugar, butter or oil

Coco bread is a Jamaican bread eaten on the island and in other areas of the Caribbean. The bread contains coconut milk and is soft and slightly sweet in taste. It is made to be split in half, and is often stuffed with a Jamaican patty or other fillings to form a sandwich. It is usually found in school cafeterias and bakeries.

== Overview ==
Coco bread originated in Jamaica; however, its exact roots are unclear. It is believed to have been born out of scarcity, and is likely to have been developed during the colonial era by enslaved and indentured Africans, as well as indentured labourers from China and India, who worked on sugar plantations. Coco bread is a variation of Jamaican grotto and hard dough breads, and it bears similarities to other sweet breads and soft dough breads introduced to the island by Chinese indentured labourers, and European colonizers. Historically, Chinese Jamaicans, descendants of indentured labourers who ran away from plantations or could not afford repatriation at the end of their contracts, as well as those who arrived after 1885 without contracts, established small businesses including most of Jamaica's grocery shops and bakeries, which have been baking and selling Jamaican patties, hard dough and coco breads.

Since then, it has been popular within Caribbean communities throughout the region, and in areas where Jamaican immigrants have settled.

== Preparation ==
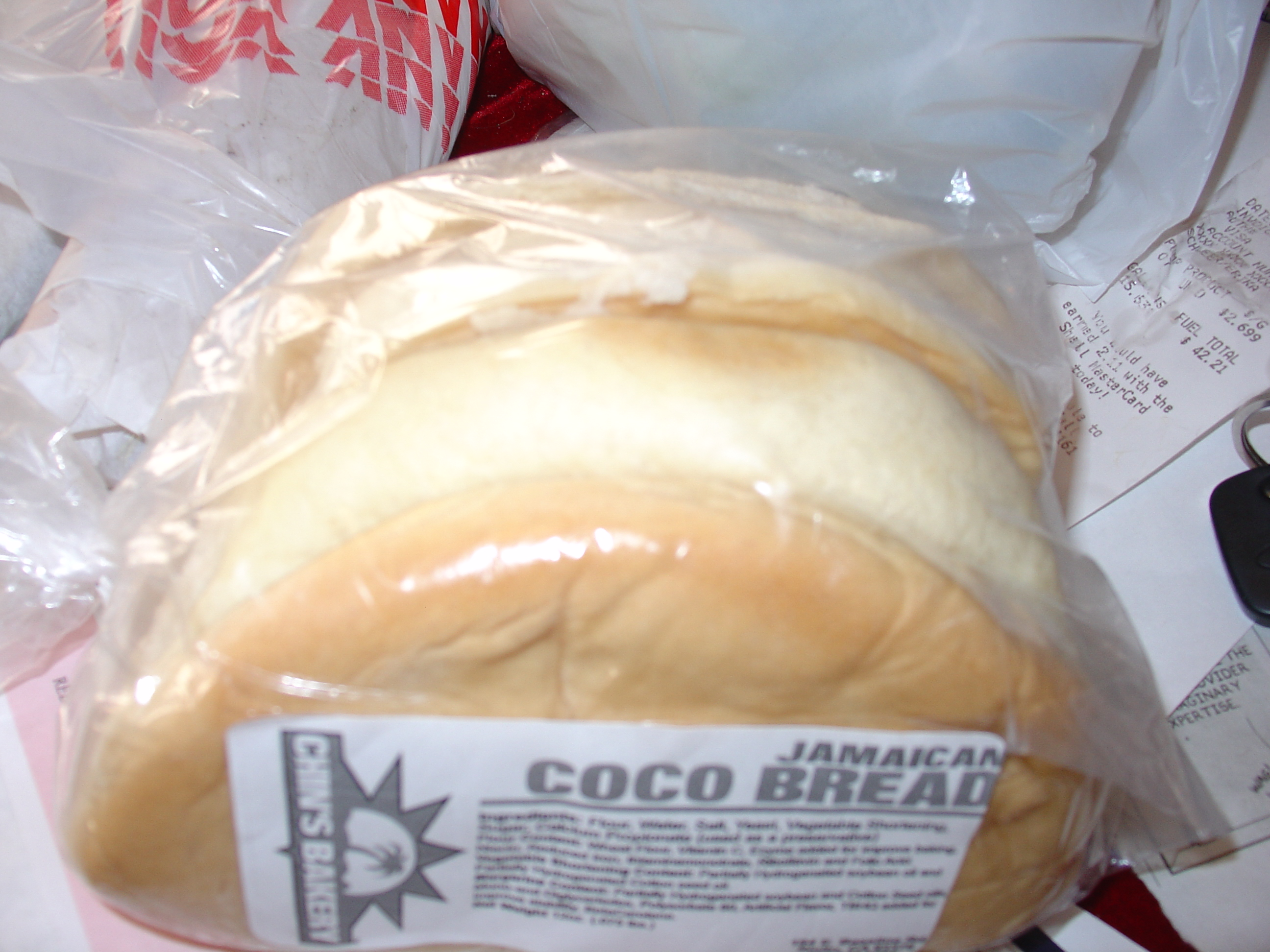
Commercially-produced coco bread

Ingredients include flour, butter or oil, yeast, sugar, and milk or coconut milk, which are combined to form a soft dough. After rising, the dough is separated into portions which are rolled out, coated with butter or oil, and folded into half-moon shaped buns (to make an easy-to-split cleft) before baking. Coco bread is dense, moist and soft in consistency, and slightly sweet in taste.

== Usage ==
The bread has been a standard offering in school cafeterias as an inexpensive and filling lunch item. In Jamaica, coco bread is usually paired with patties or other fillings to form sandwiches. It is commonly served to go in bakeries and pastry shops across the island, and is eaten by all social classes. It may be served for dipping or as part of a bread basket.

== Variations and similar breads ==
Jamaican coconut bread, which is small, round and soft, is a variation of coco bread. Hard dough and grotto breads from which coco bread is derived, and other dense, soft and slightly sweet breads like Jamaican cornbread and peg bread, are also similar. In coastal Central America, which experienced Antillean migration, especially from Jamaica, between the 17th and 20th centuries, variations of coco bread can be found, like Honduran pan de coco, also made in coastal Guatemala, Nicaragua and San Andrés (not to be confused with Filipino pan de coco), and Creole bread made in Belize. Also, Japanese milk bread, French brioche and Chinese mantou share similarities with coco bread.

== See also ==
- Bammy – traditional Jamaican cassava flatbread
- Bulla cake – spiced Jamaican cake or bread
- Dumpling § Jamaican
- Festival (food) – Jamaican deep-fried bread
- Twisted doughnuts
- Caribbean cuisine
- List of Jamaican dishes
