= Burén =

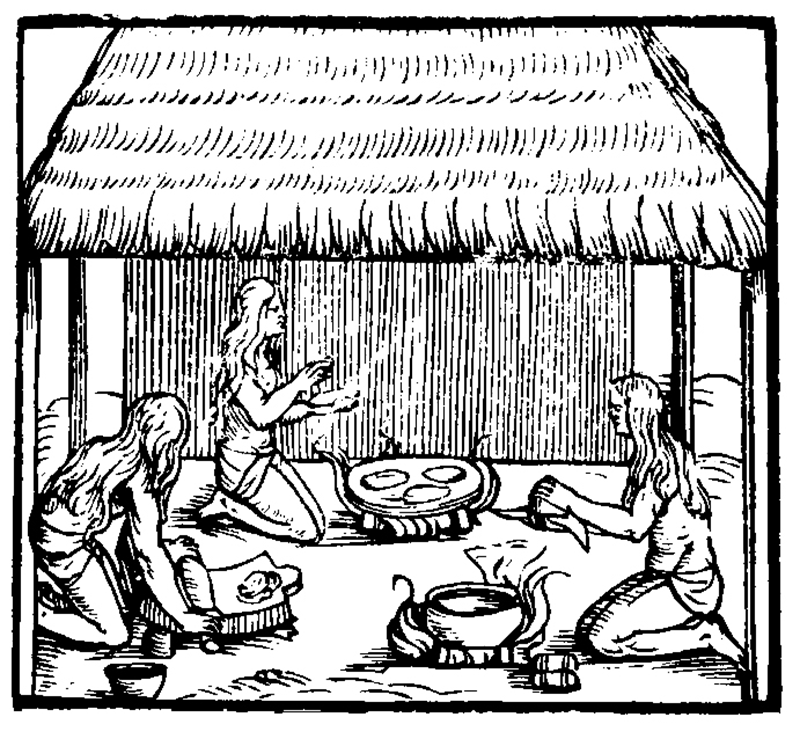
Taíno women preparing cassava bread on a burén

Burén, also known as a budare or a budali, is a cooking utensil in Puerto Rican cuisine, that originated in Taino cuisine throughout the Greater Antilles. It is a thick metal plate, and similar in structure to a griddle. During the Taino period, most buréns were ceramic. It was used by the Tainos to cook over a fire.

== Background ==
The Tainos used it to cook cassava and breadcakes called casabe. In Jamaica, a cassava flatbread of Taino origin is called bammy. They ground the cassava first, before cooking it on a burén. A woodcut was made of Taino women cooking using this method.

El Burén de Lula is a book about a chef using traditional cooking technique. A short film features her and the burén.

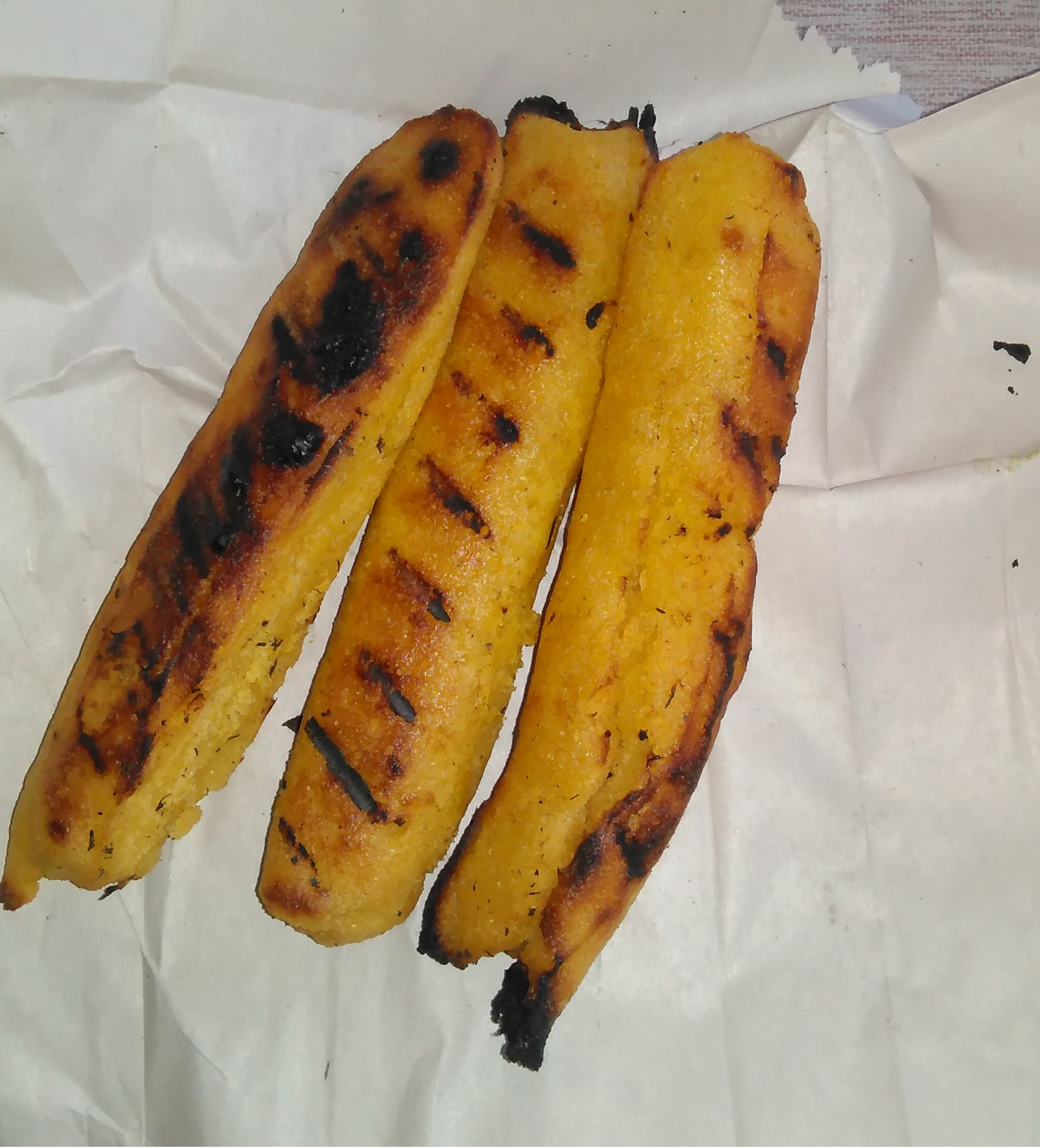
Hechas al burén

== See also ==
- Griddle
- Comal (cookware)
