= Festival (food) =

Jamaican dish

Jamaican festival
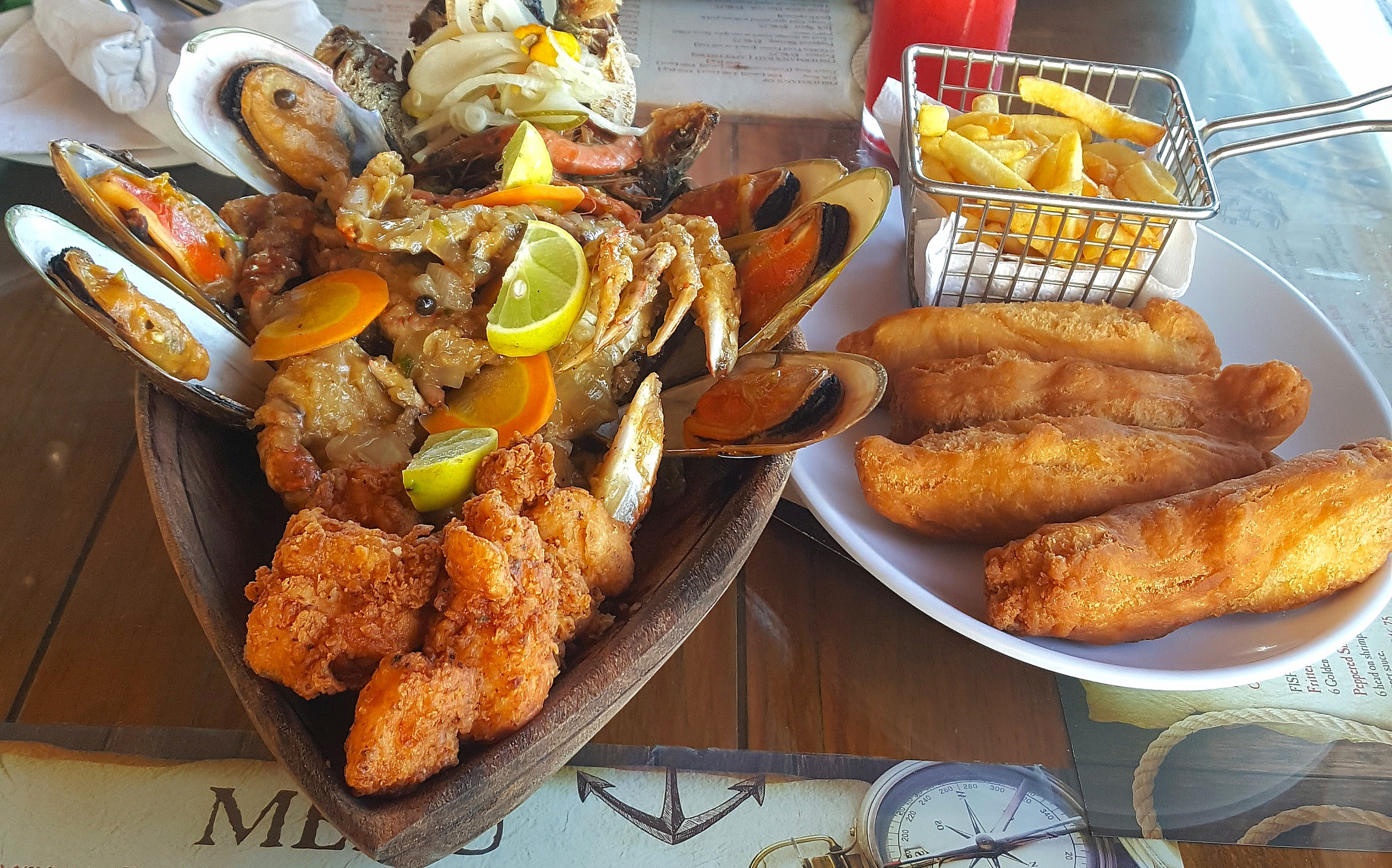
- Jamaican seafood and festival
- Course: Side dish
- Place of origin: Jamaica
- Main ingredients: Flour, cornmeal and sugar
- Variations: Sorullos (Puerto Rico), Bollitos de Maíz (Dominican Republic)

Festival or Jamaican festival is a type of deep-fried bread, typical of Jamaican cuisine, Despite its slightly sweet taste, it is served as a side dish with escovitch fish, seafood or jerk chicken, as well as a breakfast item and street food.

== Overview ==
Jamaican festival is a Creole dish which originated in Jamaica. While its exact roots are unclear, it is likely to have been created during the colonial era, from a combination of ingredients and techniques from the different ethnic groups which have inhabited the island.

The dish is similar to Chinese fried doughs which were introduced to the island by Chinese indentured labourers in the 1800s, along with Jamaican twist donuts. Festival is often described as a sweeter version of the distinguishable Jamaican fried (flour) dumpling, which is round and more savory. It also shares similarities with hushpuppy which has Native American and French influences, as well as, croquettes de maïs (corn croquettes) from France, Spanish/Latin corn fritters which also have Native American roots. Sorullos from Puerto Rico a sweet or savory version typically stuffed and fried resembling more of a mozzarella stick. In the Dominican Republic they are boiled and called bollitos de maíz (cornmeal balls) and are exactly the same as Jamaican festival. Festivals arrived in the Dominican Republic with the British island immigrants that came here to work in the sugar industry, and that we know as Cocolos.

Festival has been commonly consumed at Jamaican festivals and celebrations, particularly during Easter. It gained popularity in the 1970s, especially in the Hellshire Beach area, known for seafood.

== Preparation ==
The dough is made with wheat flour, cornmeal, baking powder, salt, milk powder/milk or evaporated milk, butter, sugar and water, which is then fried in vegetable cooking oil until golden brown, and served hot. Sometimes, coconut milk is used or vanilla essence and nutmeg may be added to the dough. The finished festival should be crispy on the outside, while soft and fluffy on the inside.

Traditionally, festival is served as a side dish with savory meals such as fried fish, escovitch fish, seafood dishes, jerk pork or jerk chicken. Its slightly sweet flavor complements the spicy and tangy profiles of these dishes, making it a staple in Jamaican cuisine. Festival is also eaten as a street food or snack, and it is a popular breakfast side dish often paired with ackee and saltfish.

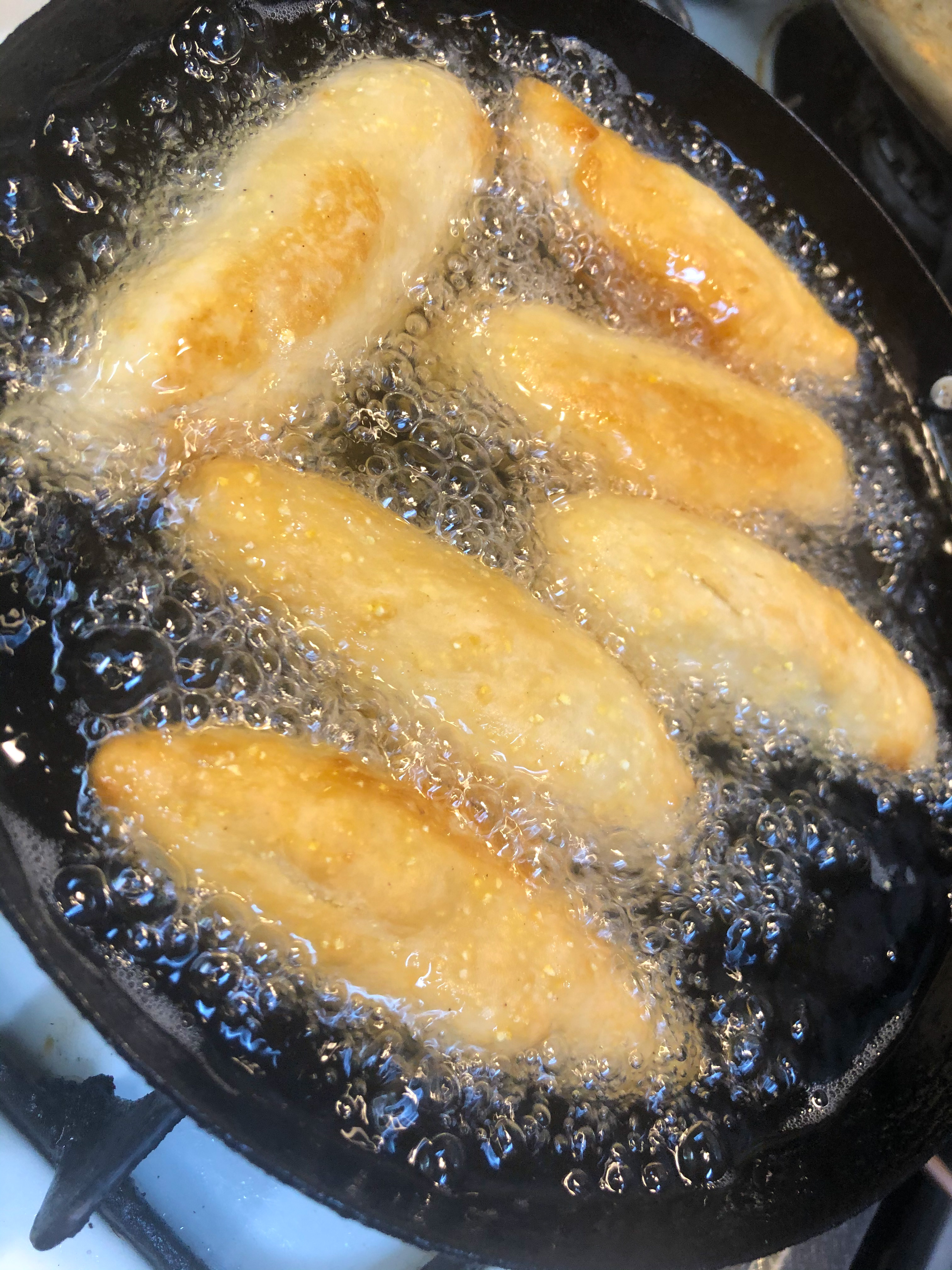
Festival frying

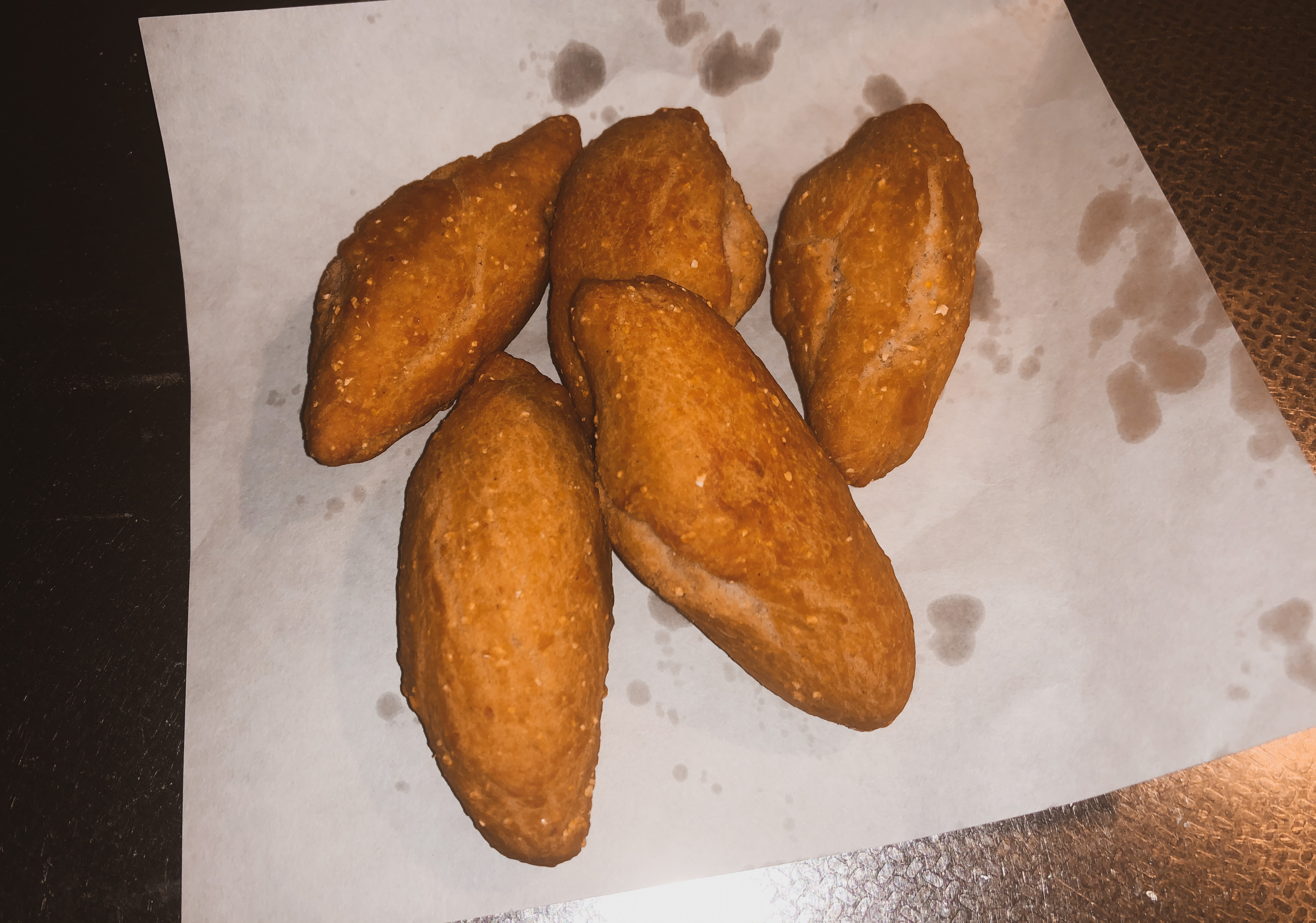
Festival

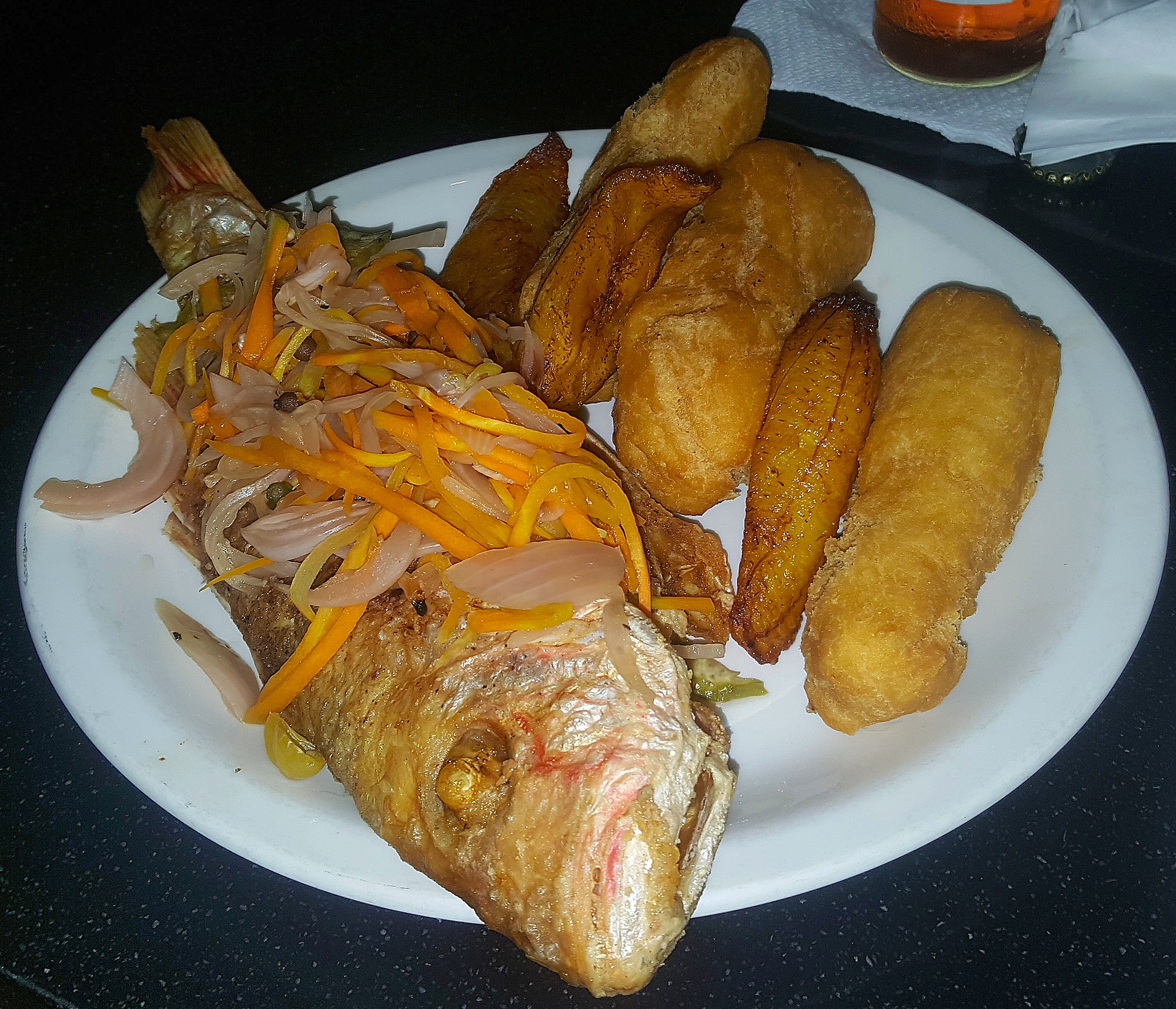
Jamaican escovitch fish, festivals and plantains

== See also ==
- Bammy
- Sorullos
- Stamp and Go
- Coco bread
- Hard dough bread
- Bulla cake
- Jamaican cuisine
- List of Jamaican dishes
