= Pan de coco (Honduran cuisine) =

Honduran sweet bread

- Place of origin: Honduras
- Main ingredients: Coconut milk

Pan de coco, literally "coconut bread" in Spanish, is a dense, cake-like bread from the Garifuna people of the Caribbean coast located in Honduras. It likely originated from the Caribbean, due to Antillean migration to the Bay Islands region of Honduras and along La Mosquitia between the 18th and 20th centuries.

Pan de coco is similar to Belizean Creole bread and Jamaican coconut bread which are small, soft, round and savory, as well as, another variation called coco bread which also originated from the island. It also resembles a similar sweet bread made in the Philippines.The Spanish Manila Galleon brought coconut from the Philippines to Mexico during the colonial period, and was then subsequently brought to Honduras.

Its dough features coconut milk as its main ingredient, and typically does not incorporate eggs or milk. Despite its coconut content, the bread is not sweet and is often served with savory foods, such as stews or soups. Many variations of pan de coco can be found in various other Latin American countries.

== See also ==
- Honduran cuisine
- Coco bread
- Latin American Cuisine
- Wingko
- Serabi
- Queijadinha
