= Jerk (cooking) =

Style of cooking native to Jamaica

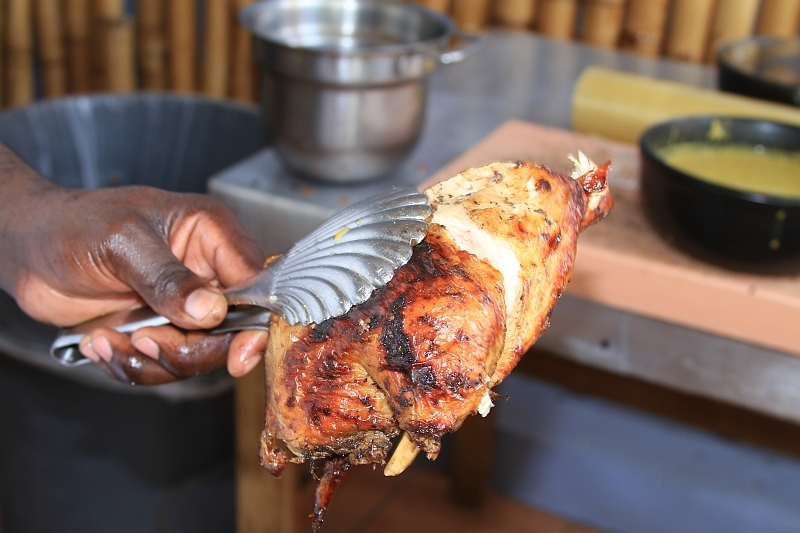
- Jamaican jerk chicken
- Course: Main dish
- Place of origin: Jamaica
- Created by: Indigenous Taínos
- Serving temperature: Hot
- Main ingredients: Meat, pimento and Scotch bonnet pepper.

Key ingredients in jerk cooking:

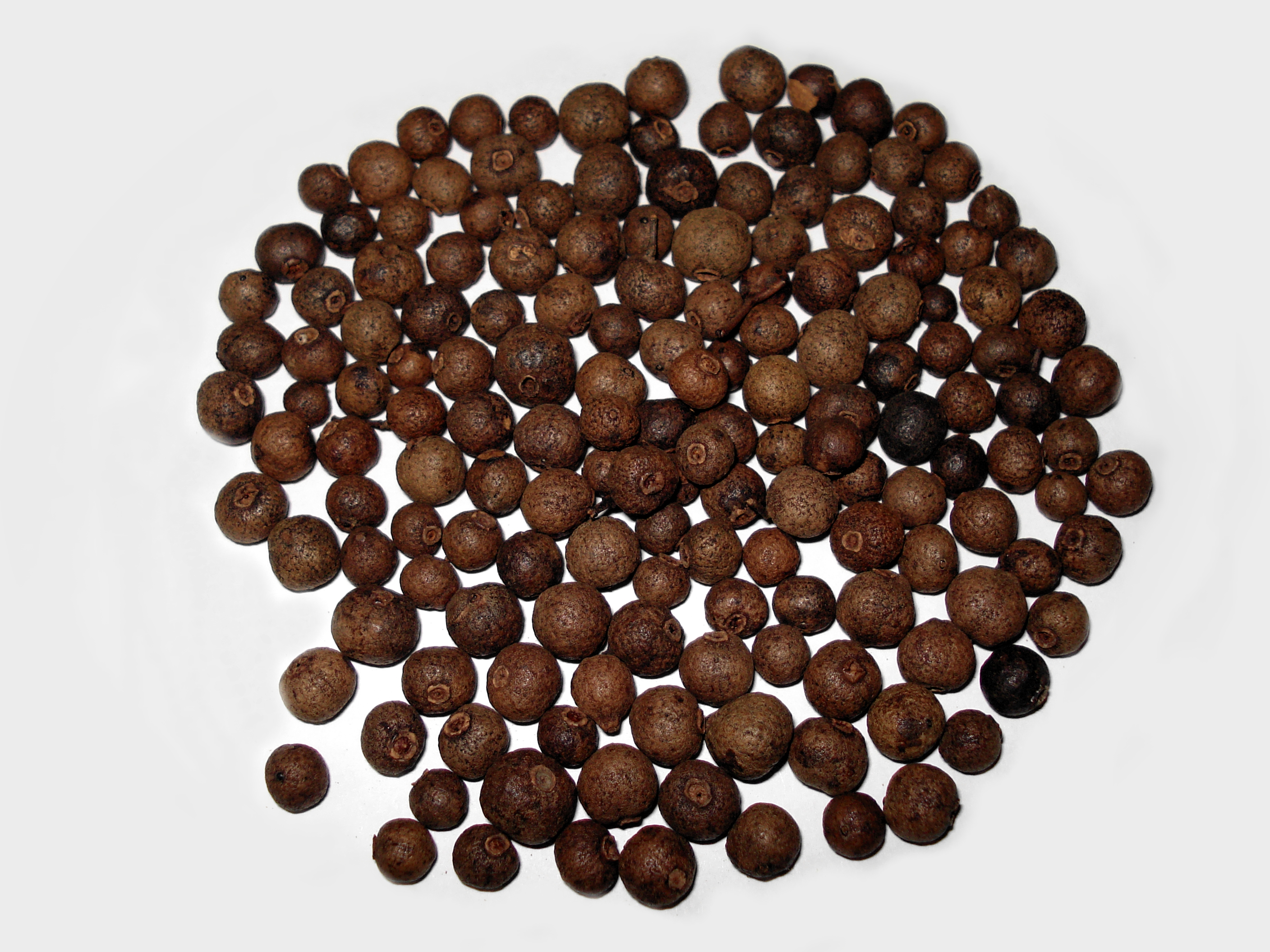
Allspice (dried unripe fruit of Pimenta dioica)

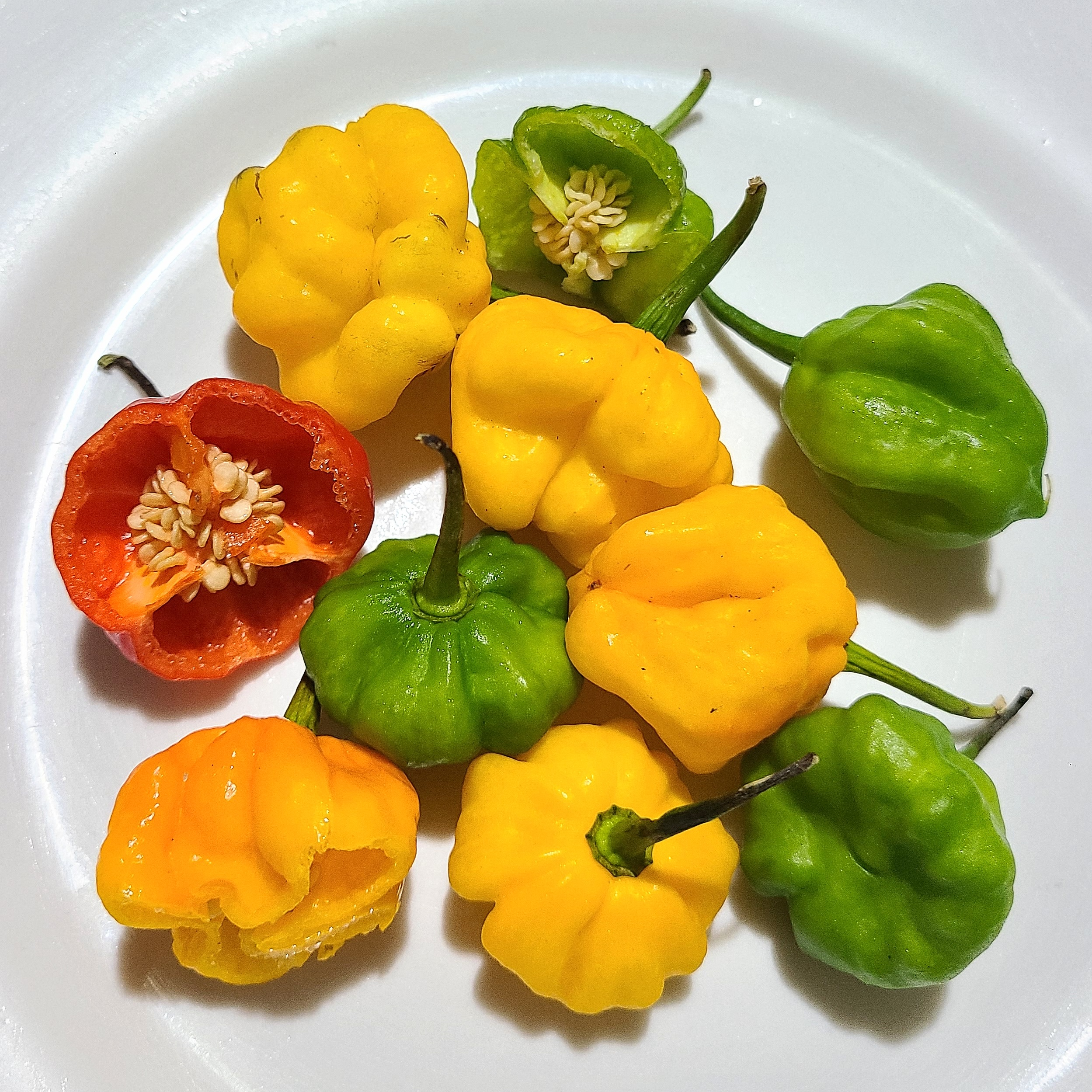
Scotch bonnet peppers native to Jamaica (cultivar of Capsicum chinense)

Jerk is a style of cooking native to Jamaica, in which meat is dry-rubbed or wet-marinated with a hot spice mixture called Jamaican jerk spice.

The technique of jerking (or cooking with jerk spice) originated from Jamaica's indigenous peoples, the Arawak and Taíno tribes, and was adopted by the descendants of 17th-century Jamaican Maroons who intermingled with them.

The smoky taste of jerked meat is achieved by using various cooking methods, including modern wood-burning ovens. Chicken or pork is usually jerked, and the main ingredients of the spicy jerk marinade/sauce are allspice (Note: A fragrant spice native to the Caribbean, the dried ground berry of a particular species of the flowering shrub Pimenta dioica. The Jamaican name for allspice is "pimento", due to conflation of the words pimenta and pimento. It is also called myrtle pepper.) and Scotch bonnet peppers, which are native to Jamaica and were cultivated by the Taínos.

== Etymology ==
The word "jerk" is said to come from charqui, a Spanish term of Quechua origin for jerked or dried meat, which eventually became the word "jerky" in English.

The term jerk spice (also known as Jamaican jerk spice) refers to the spice rub. The word "jerk" refers to the spice rub, a wet marinade and mop sauce made from it, as well as the particular cooking technique.

== History ==
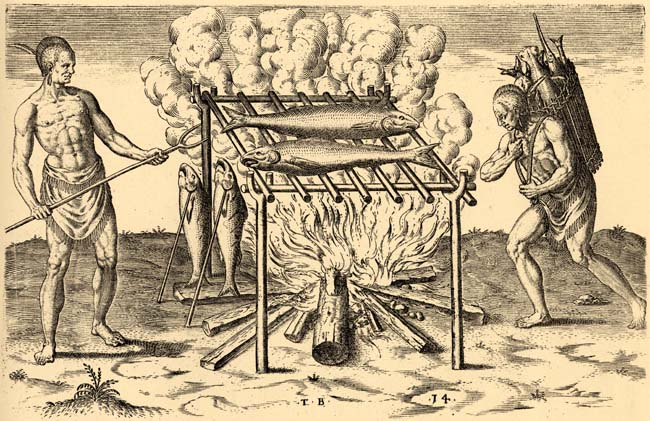
Taíno term barabicu or barbacoa means “framework of sticks”—a wide range of structures, including earth oven or cooking pit and a raised wooden grill for roasting and smoking foods.

=== Origin ===
According to historical evidence, jerked meat was first cooked by the indigenous Taínos. In 1516, Spanish historian Gonzalo Fernández de Oviedo y Valdés, documented how they prepared and preserved meats and fish on a barbacoa, using native hot peppers (Scotch bonnet and cayenne pepper) and pimento for seasoning. Sometimes, meats were wrapped in papaya leaves to tenderize them before jerking. Historically, local game (wild meats) were jerked, such as coney (hutia), iguana, wild hog (peccary), agouti, wild birds, waterfowl, turtle etc., while a variety of seafood included parrotfish, grouper, snapper, shark, lobster, conch and others.

In the early period of colonization, Spanish conquistadors also adopted Taíno culinary traditions in order to survive. They introduced livestock (pig, cattle and chicken) to the island in the 1500s, which were often cured by adopting the Taíno method of jerking meats over a barbacoa, using pimento wood and berries for flavour and preservation. During the invasion of Jamaica in 1655, the Spanish colonists freed the enslaved Africans who fled into the Jamaican countryside, becoming some of the first Jamaican Maroons. They intermingled with the remaining Taínos, learning and adapting aspects of their culture including the practice of jerking.

=== Barbacoa technique ===
The method of cooking in underground pits is speculated by some to have been used to avoid creating smoke which would have revealed their location. However, this technique is a form of barbacoa which has been used by indigenous peoples across the Americas for centuries, and is also found in other parts of the world—most notably in Hawaii, where it appears as kālua-style imu cooking, central to the luau.

Historians further concluded that the Taínos developed the cooking techniques and seasoning practices used throughout the region. The method of jerking meats on native pimento wood traces back to the Taíno term “barabicu” or barbacoa, meaning “framework of sticks”, applied to a range of wooden structures, including a raised wooden grill for roasting and smoking foods, and earth ovens. This Taíno technique spread throughout the Americas, and many food historians agree that all forms of barbecue evolved from this original cooking method.

=== The preservation of traditional jerk ===
In the 17th century, all racial groups hunted wild hogs in the Jamaican interior and used the practice of jerking to cook them. However, by the end of the 18th century, most groups had switched to imported pork products, while the Maroons largely continued the practice of hunting wild hogs and jerking pork. Jamaican jerk sauce believed to have been primarily developed by them, added flavour to wild hogs which were seasoned with herbs and allspice before slow-cooking over pimento wood. (Note: A flowering shrub native to the Caribbean, Pimenta dioica, also called myrtle pepper; conflated from "pimenta", another name also for the berry and spice known as allspice.)) The heat found in Caribbean jerk is largely attributed to the use of Scotch bonnet peppers. Over time the basic recipe has been modified as various cultures added their influence.

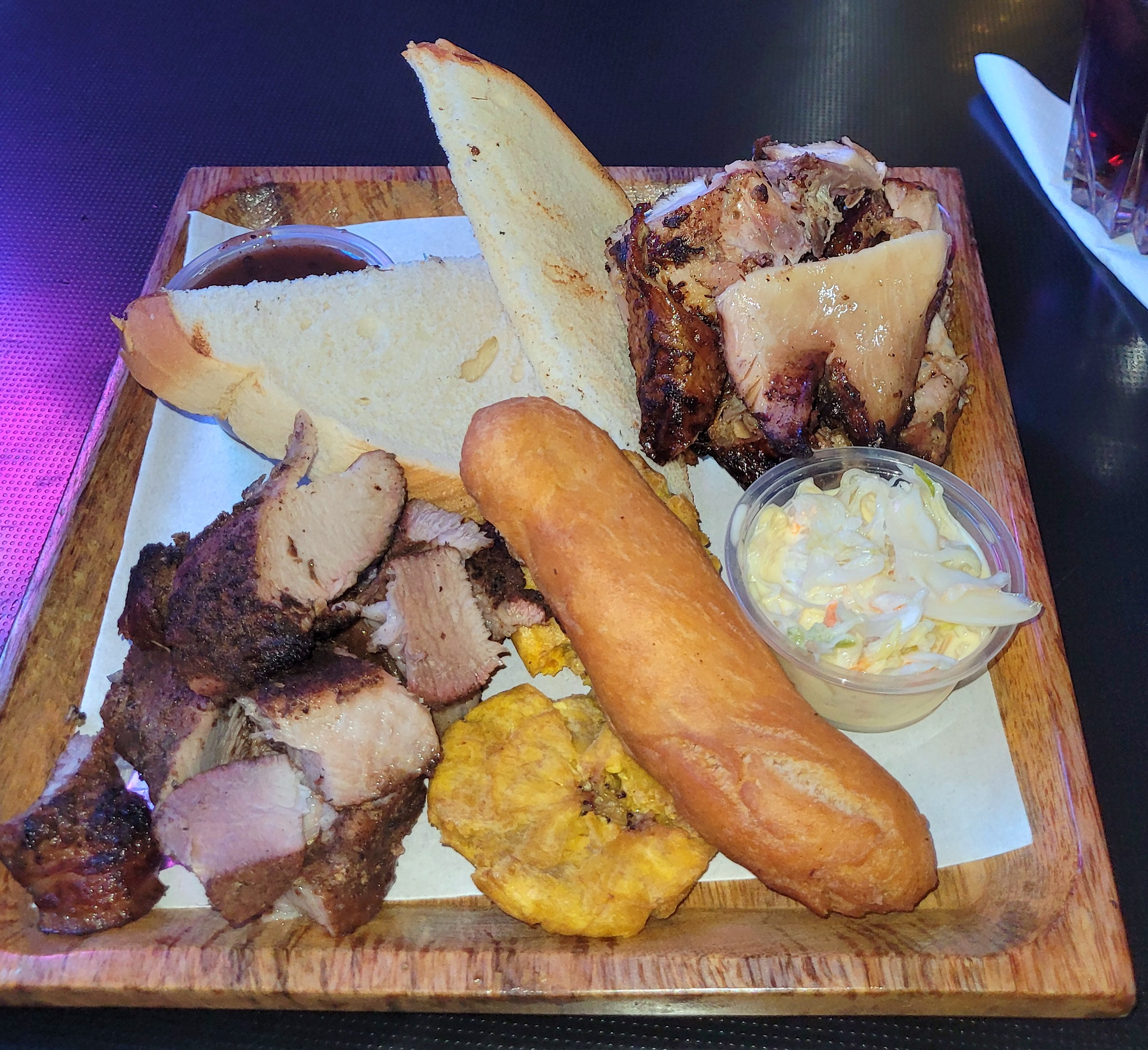
Jerk pork and chicken served with hard dough bread, jerk sauce, festival, fried pressed plantain and coleslaw, in Jamaica

== The globalization of jerk cuisine ==
Jerk cooking and seasoning have followed the Caribbean diaspora all over the world, and forms of jerk can now be found at restaurants almost anywhere a significant population of Caribbean descent exists, such as the United Kingdom, Canada, the United States, coastal Panama, Costa Rica, Honduras, Nicaragua and San Andrés. As such, Jamaican jerk has developed a global following, most notably in American, Canadian and Western European cosmopolitan urban centres. Poulet boucané (smoked chicken), a dish found in French Caribbean countries such as Martinique and Guadeloupe, is quite similar to traditional Jamaican jerk chicken.

== Techniques ==
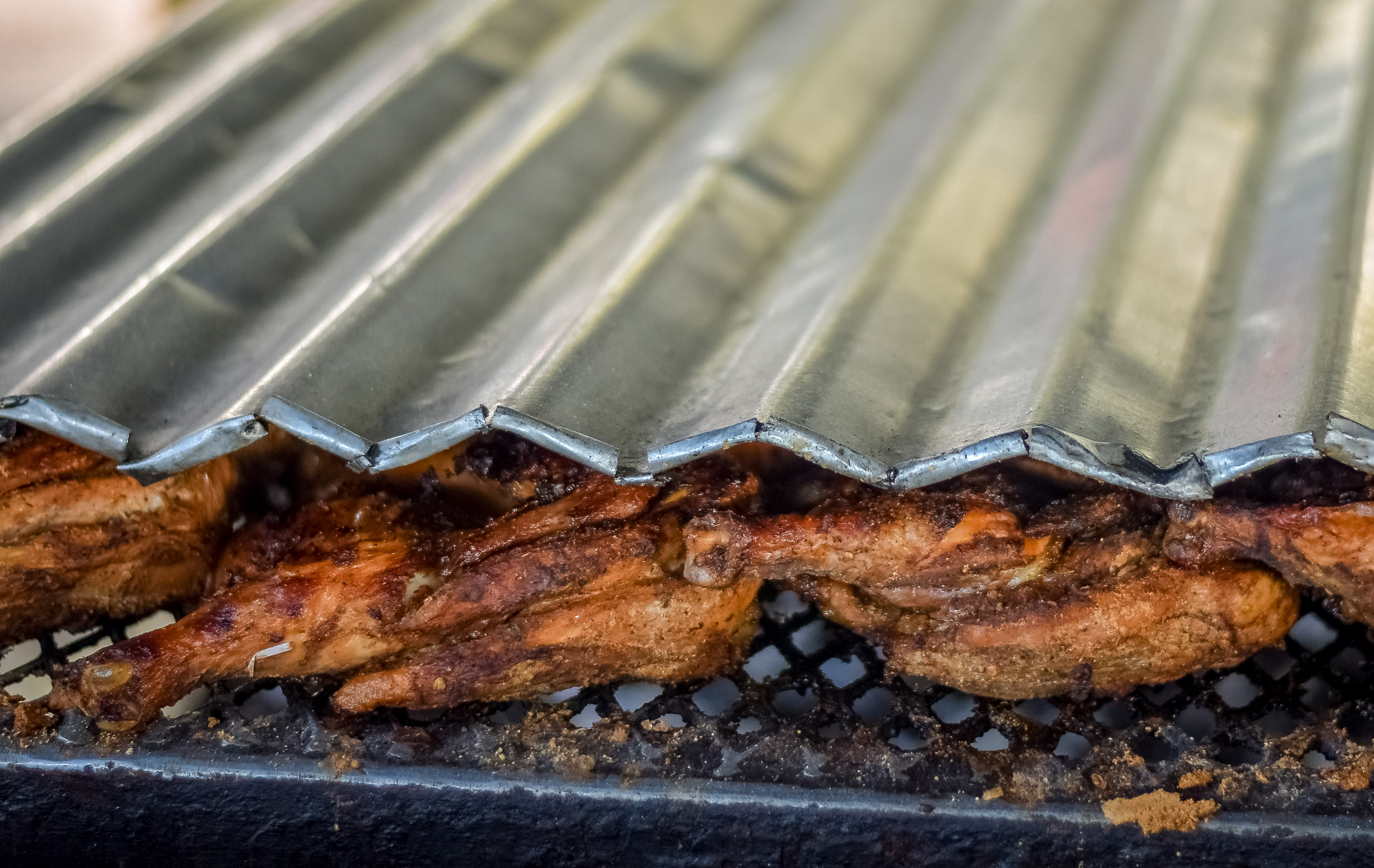
Jerk chicken cooking in Montego Bay

The cooking technique of jerking and the results it produces, have evolved over time, from using pit fires to grilling over coals in old metal barrel halves. Around the 1960s, Caribbean entrepreneurs seeking an easier, more portable method of jerking, began cutting oil barrels lengthwise, adding holes for ventilation and hinged lids to capture the smoke. These barrels are fired with charcoal, and have become widely used across the island. Other jerking methods include wood-burning ovens.

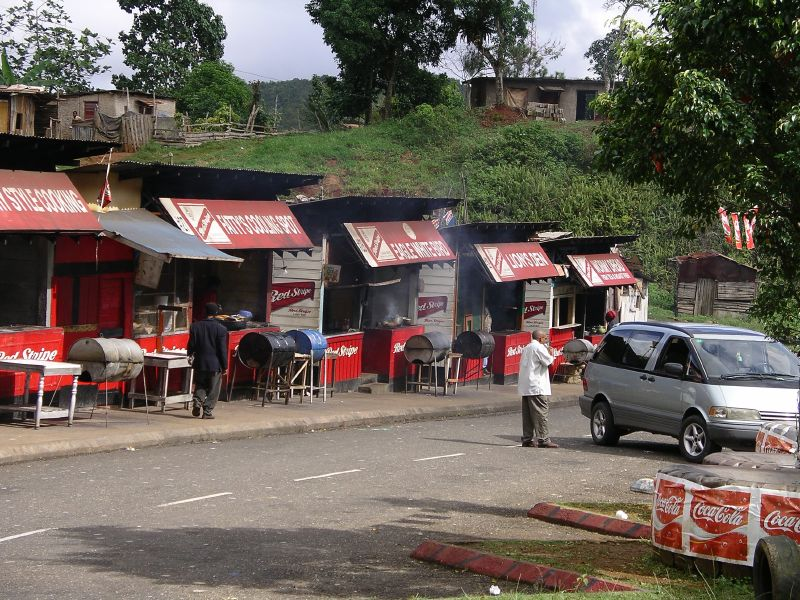
Jerk stands along Highway A1

Street-side "jerk stands" or "jerk centres" are commonly found in Jamaica and the nearby Cayman Islands, as well as, other places that experienced waves of Jamaican migration, like San Andrés. Jerked meat, usually chicken or pork, can be purchased along with hard dough bread, bammy (a native cassava flatbread), Jamaican fried dumplings (known as "Johnnycake" or journey cakes), and festival, a variation of sweet flavoured fried dumplings, served as a side dish.

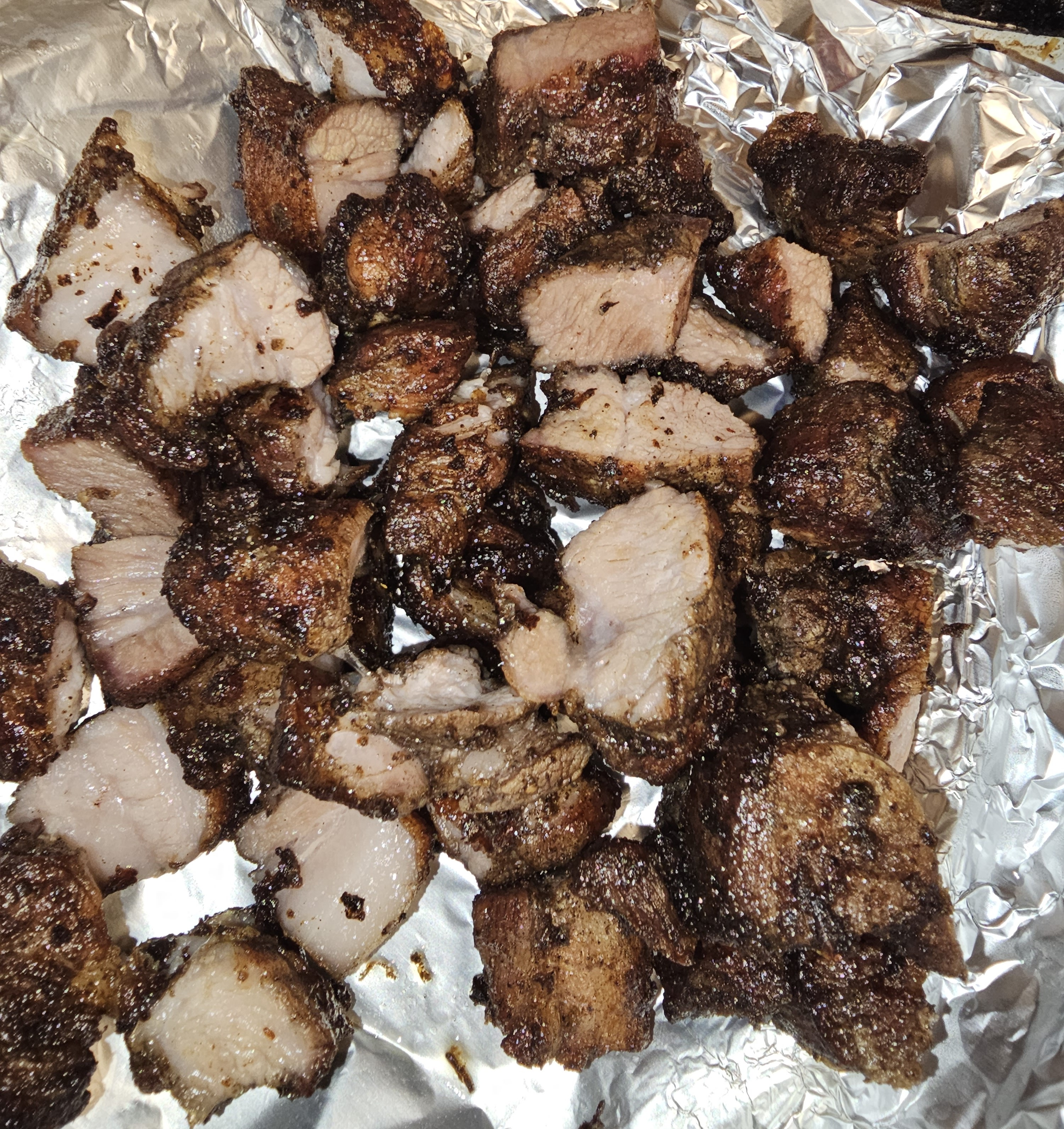
Jerk pork

== Ingredients and uses ==
Jerk seasoning principally consists of allspice and Scotch bonnet peppers. Other ingredients may include cloves, cinnamon, scallions, nutmeg, thyme, garlic, brown sugar, ginger, soy sauce, vinegar, and salt.

Jerk seasoning was originally used on chicken and pork, however has now been expanded to other ingredients including fish, shrimp, lobster, conch, shellfish, beef, sausage, lamb, goat, tofu, and vegetables. In Jamaica, jerk is also used in the preparation of pizzas, pastas, patties and burgers.

== Protection of "Jamaica Jerk" ==
Due to the growing international popularity of Jamaican jerk, a number of unauthentic jerk products are being sold outside of Jamaica. Consequently, the Jamaican government trademarked Jamaica Jerk, as a geographical indication (GI), in September 2015, making Jamaica the first country in the English-speaking Caribbean to register a GI. The move is aimed at guarding against those who seek to capitalise on the Jamaican brand, and to protect the quality, characteristics and reputation of Jamaican jerk internationally from misrepresentation and imitation.

== See also ==
- List of Jamaican dishes
- List of chicken dishes
- Jamaican cuisine
- Barbacoa
