= Bulla cake =

Jamaican bread

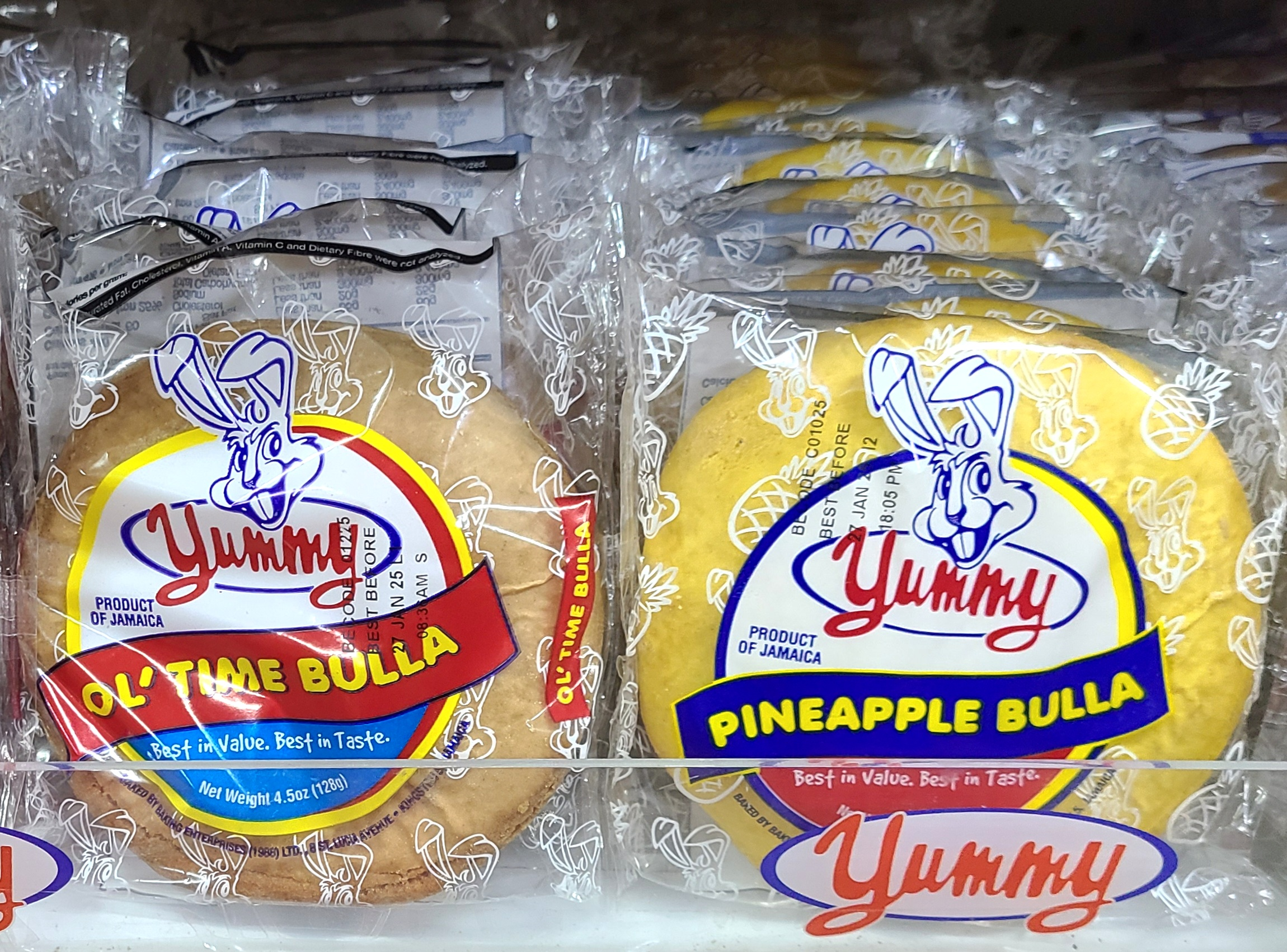
- Bulla cakes in Jamaica
- Alternative names: Bullah
- Type: Snack
- Place of origin: Jamaica
- Main ingredients: Molasses, flour and brown sugar
- Variations: Bonbon siwo (also bonbon sirop or bomosio) (Haiti); Gingerbread

Bulla cake, usually referred to as bulla, is a rich Jamaican cake made with molasses and brown sugar, and spiced with ginger and nutmeg.

== Overview ==
Jamaican bulla cakes are small loaves that are flat, round, and sometimes dark-colored or light-colored. They are inexpensive and easy to make using molasses, brown sugar, vanilla, flour and baking soda. In Jamaica, bulla comes in different flavours such as "spice" (with cinnamon and nutmeg), Jamaican ginger, coconut and pineapple. Also, smaller bulla cakes ("mini-bulla") are sold on the island.

The name "bulla" derived from the Spanish word bolla/bollo meaning "bun".

Traditionally, bulla is a popular treat for schoolchildren, often paired with milk or cherry malt. It is commonly paired with cheese or avocado.

As a traditional food of Jamaica, the bulla cake has been considered an emblem related to development on the island nation. Former solicitor general of Jamaica and Air Jamaica president Kenneth Rattray was a fan of bulla.

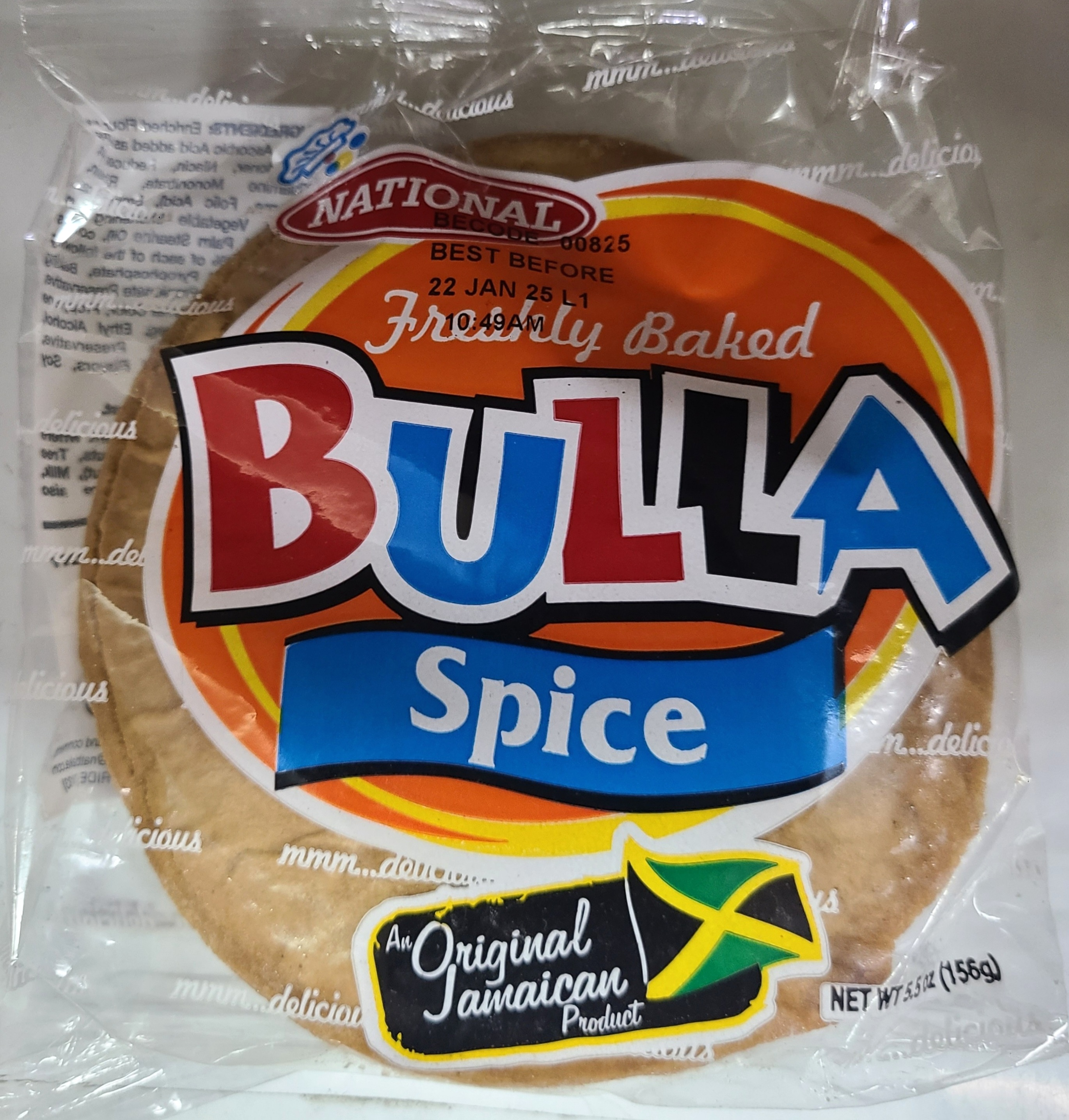
Jamaican spice bulla

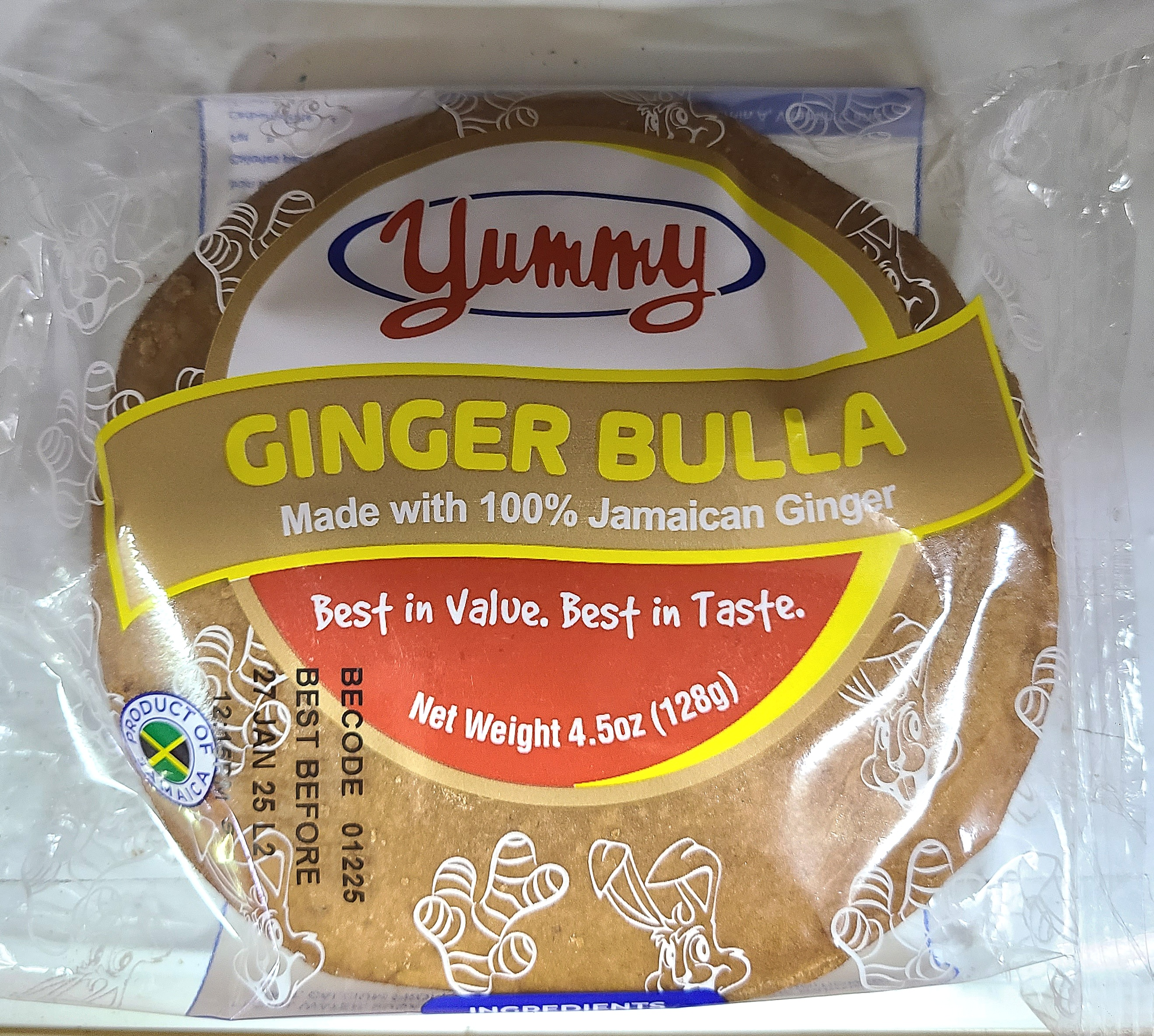
Jamaican ginger bulla

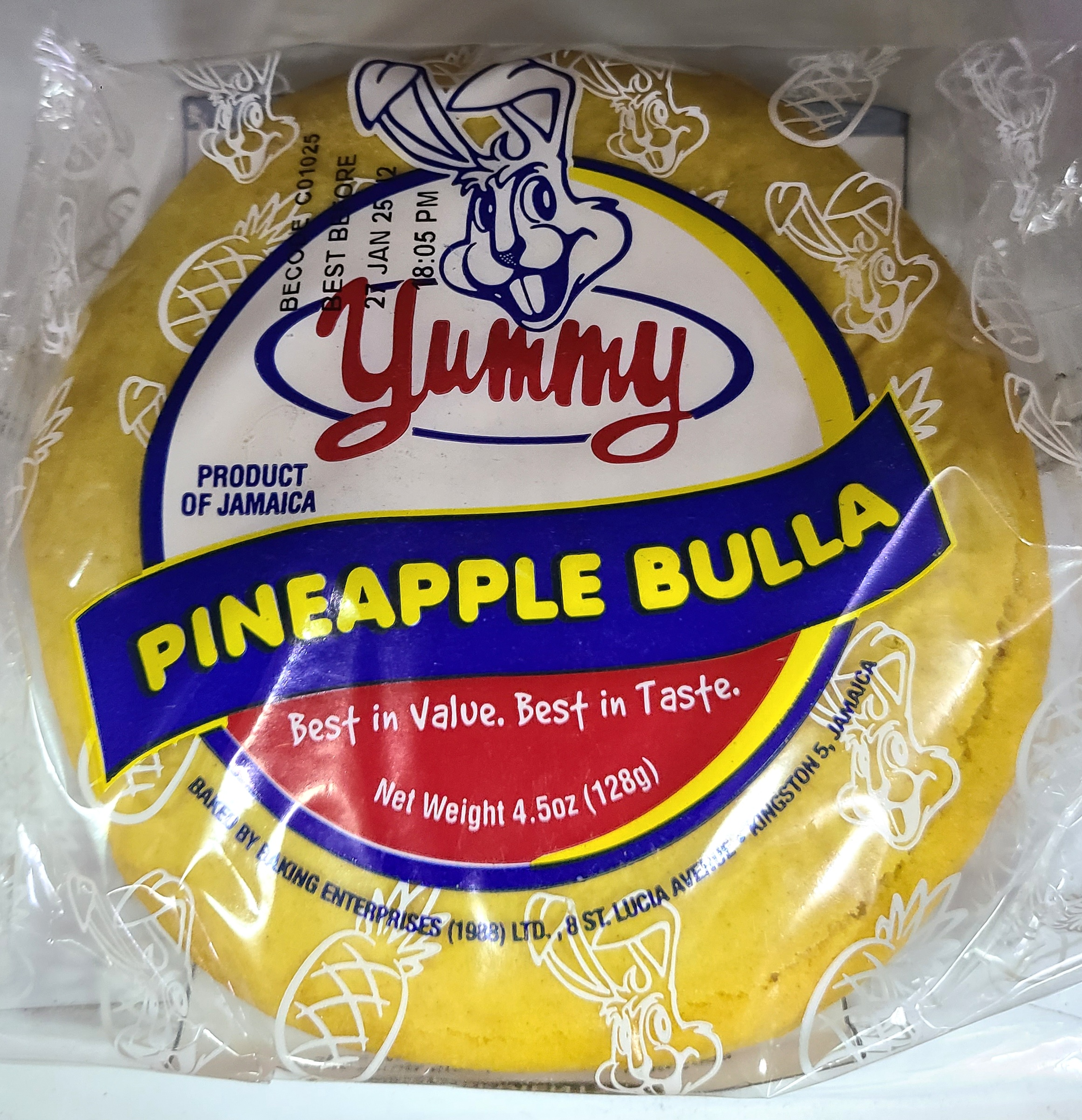
Jamaican pineapple bulla

== See also ==
- Jamaican cuisine
- Coco bread
- Hard dough bread
- Jamaican patty
- Jamaican festival
- Bammy
- List of Jamaican dishes
