= Bammy =

Jamaican flatbread

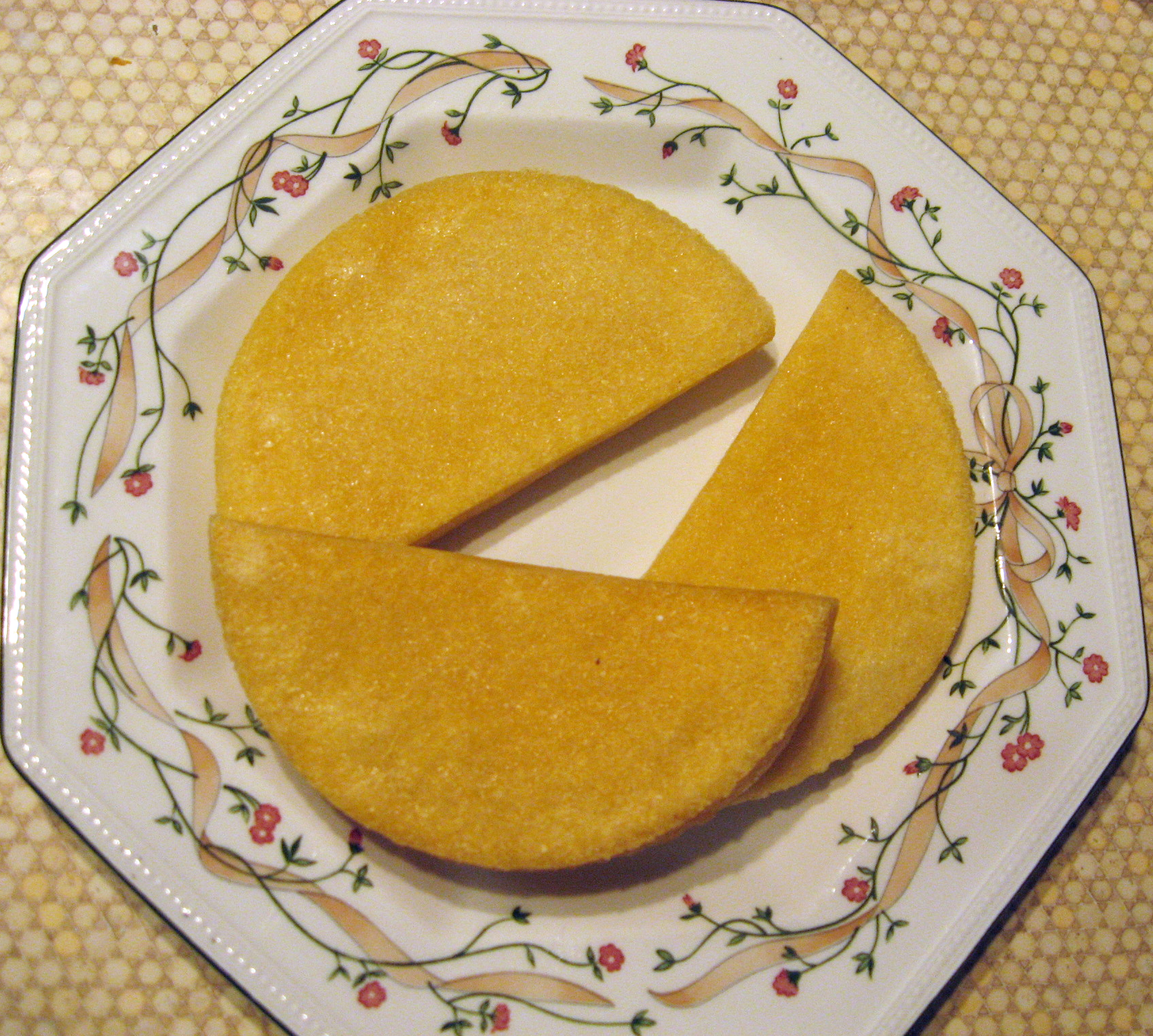
- Type: Flatbread
- Course: Side dish
- Place of origin: Jamaica
- Created by: Taínos
- Main ingredients: Cassava

Bammy is a traditional Jamaican cassava flatbread descended from the simple flatbread called casabe, eaten by the Taínos, Jamaica's Indigenous people. Variations of bammy exist throughout the Americas. It is produced in many rural communities and sold in stores and by street vendors in Jamaica and abroad.

== History ==
=== Origin ===
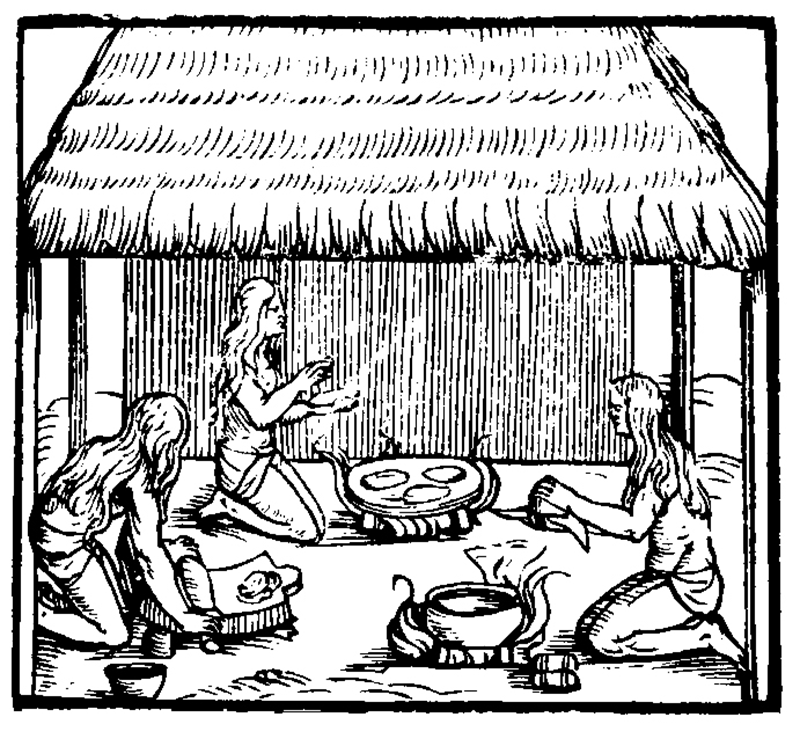
Taíno women preparing casabe (cassava bread) in 1565— grinding cassava/yuca roots into paste with a metate and mano, shaping the bread, and cooking it on a fire-heated burén.

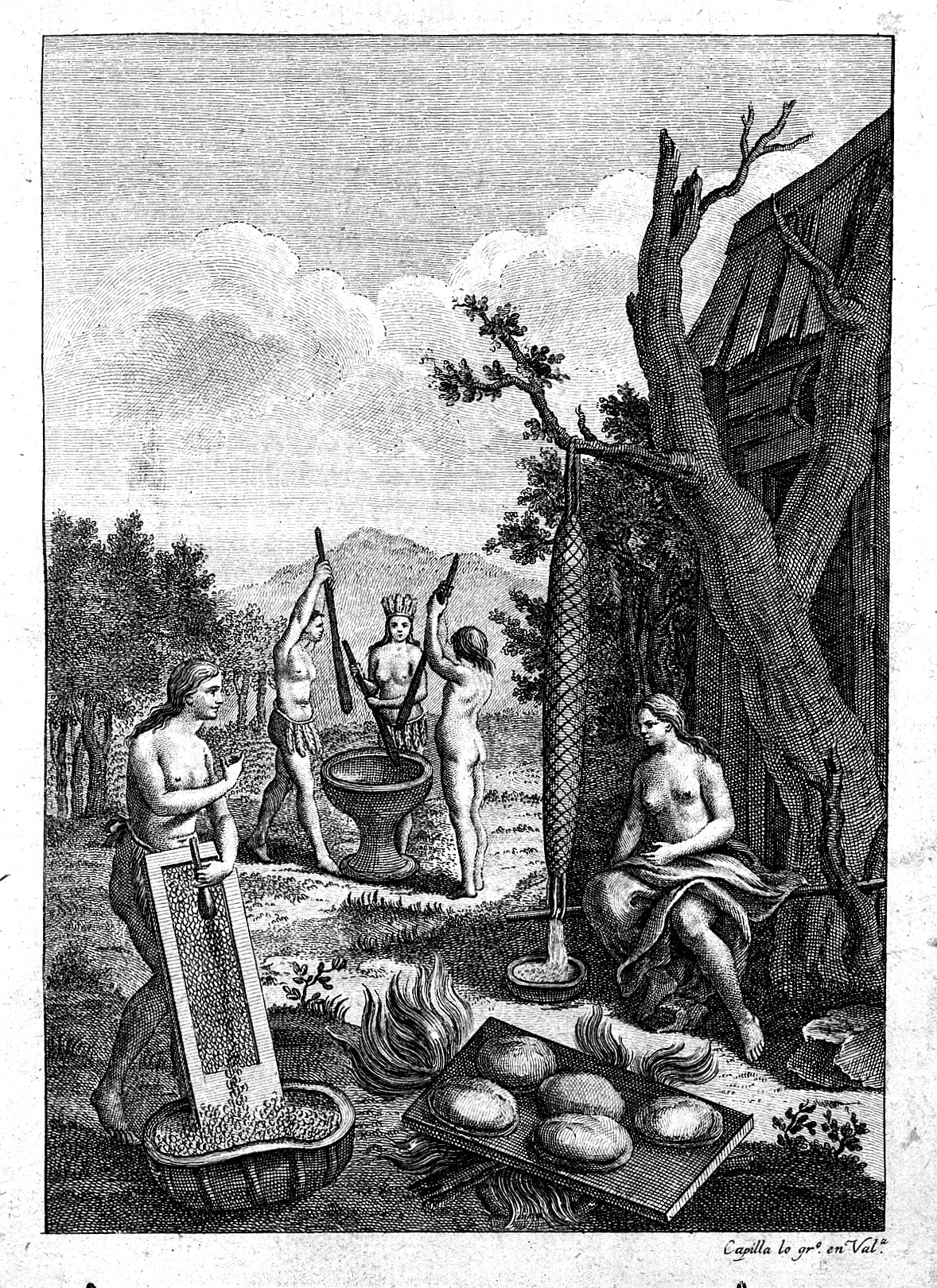
Casabe (cassava bread) preparation in 1791— with stone mortar and pestles, wooden frame guayo, matapi on a tree and burén.

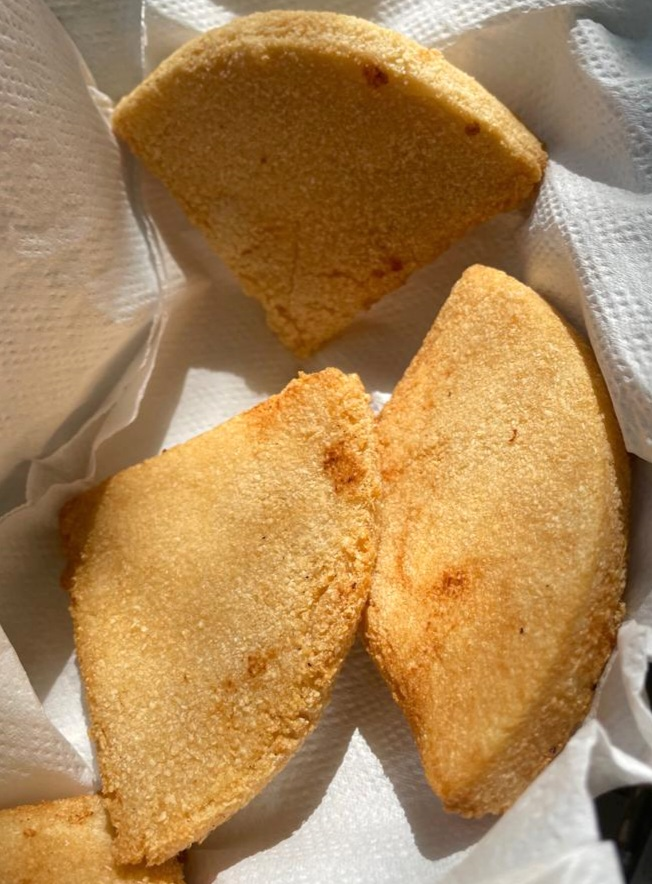
Fried bammy in Jamaica

Bammies have existed since pre-Columbian times, and they originated from the Taíno people. They are made with cassava (also called yuca or manioc) indigenous to South America, and was a staple crop of the Taínos, which they cultivated in conucos. Cassava was also integral to their existence, as it featured prominently in their worship. Yúcahu, a major Taíno god, whose name has been translated to ‘spirit of the cassava’, was the god of cassava and the sea. A minor Taíno god related to growing cassava, the process of life, creation and death, Baibrama, was worshipped for his assistance in growing cassava and curing people from its poisonous juice.

Bammies became a key part of the diet of the Spaniards, who adopted the dish, and later the British soldiers and settlers, because they could stay fresh for months and were easy to transport.

=== Taíno traditional method ===
According to the curator of the Jamaica National Heritage Trust, Ann-Marie Howard Brown, the Taínos used a small, sharp, flat stone (celt) to peel and cut the cassava, which they would then grate on a guaio/guayo, a wooden frame embedded with small stones and pieces of coral or a stone grater, until it was reduced to a pulp. They would then place the pulp in a large funnel-shaped basket called a matapi, which was hung from a tree for extraction of the juice. Once the desired consistency was achieved, the mixture was placed on a stone structure called a metate, and a smaller ground stone called a mano, was used like a modern rolling pin to grind to the consistency of cassava flour. This would then be moulded to circles in the desired size, and baked on earthenware griddles called buréns.

The Taínos passed on this tradition to the Spanish, British, enslaved and free Africans and Creoles, and most aspects of the original method of preparing bammy are still practised in parts of St Elizabeth and South East Manchester today.

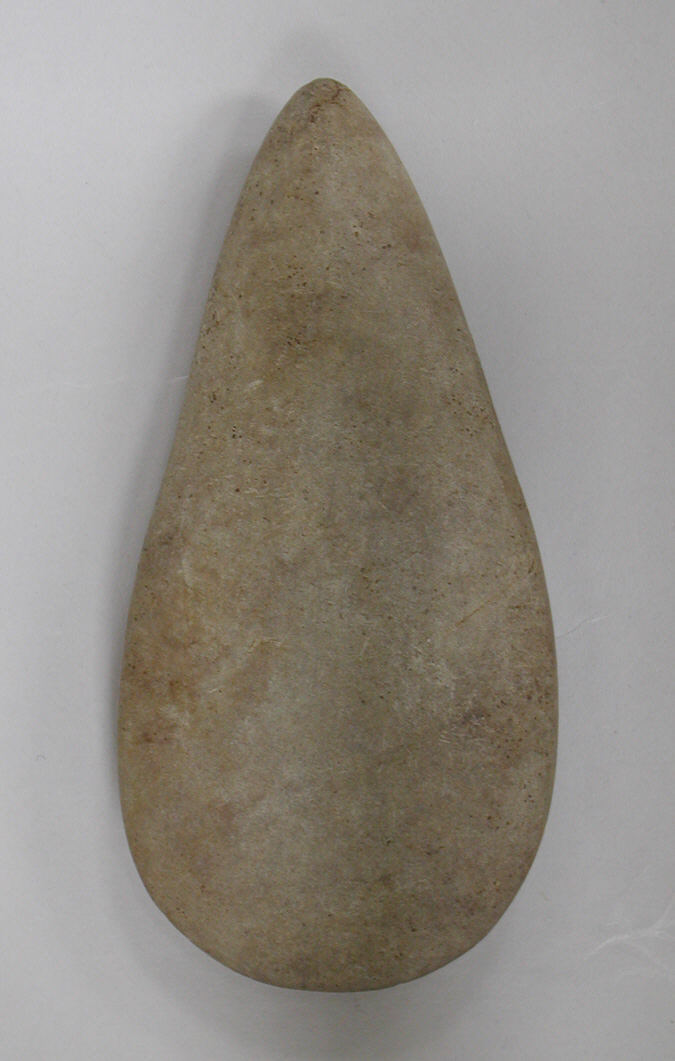
Stone celt (knife), used to peel and cut the cassava

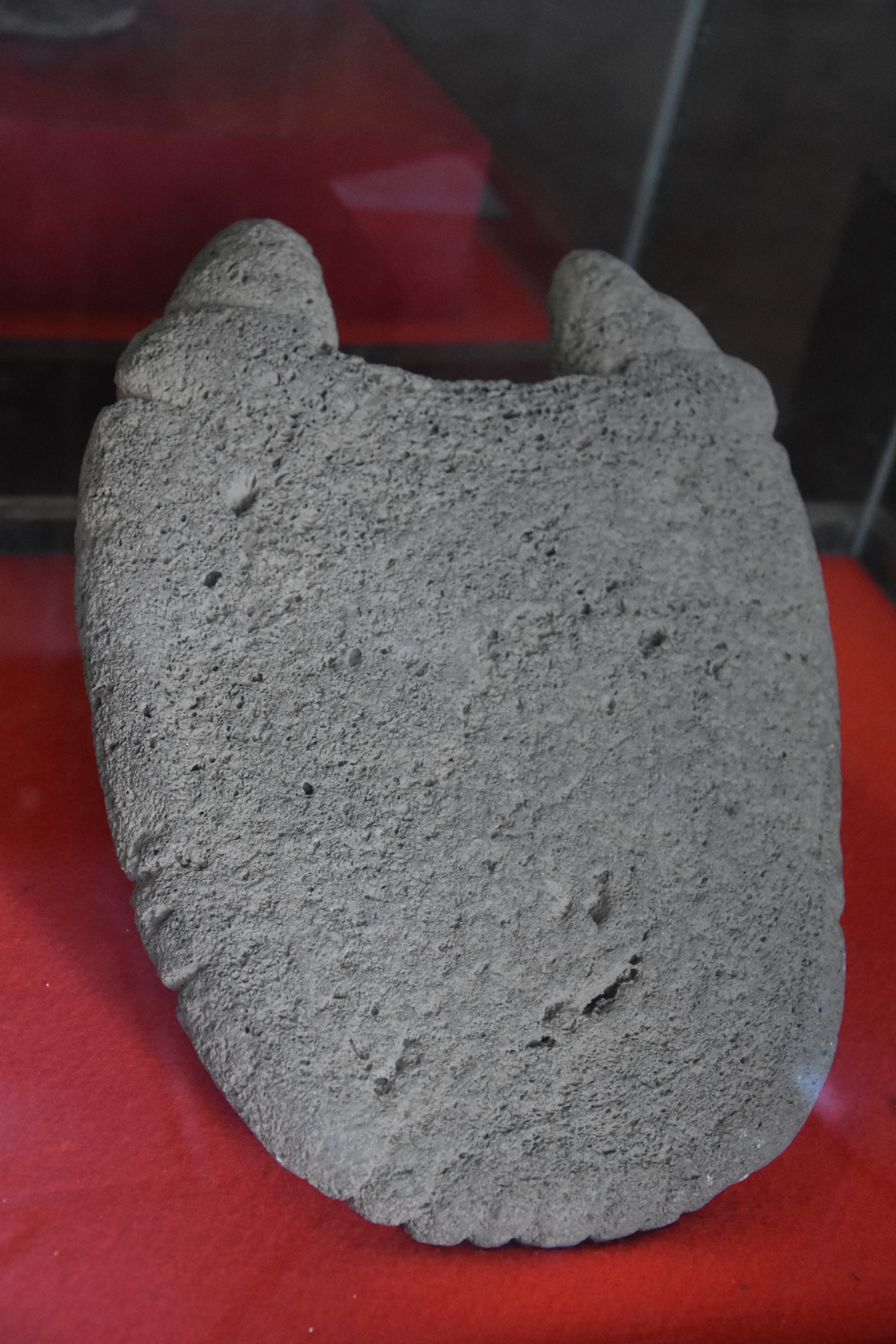
Stone guayo, used to grate cassava

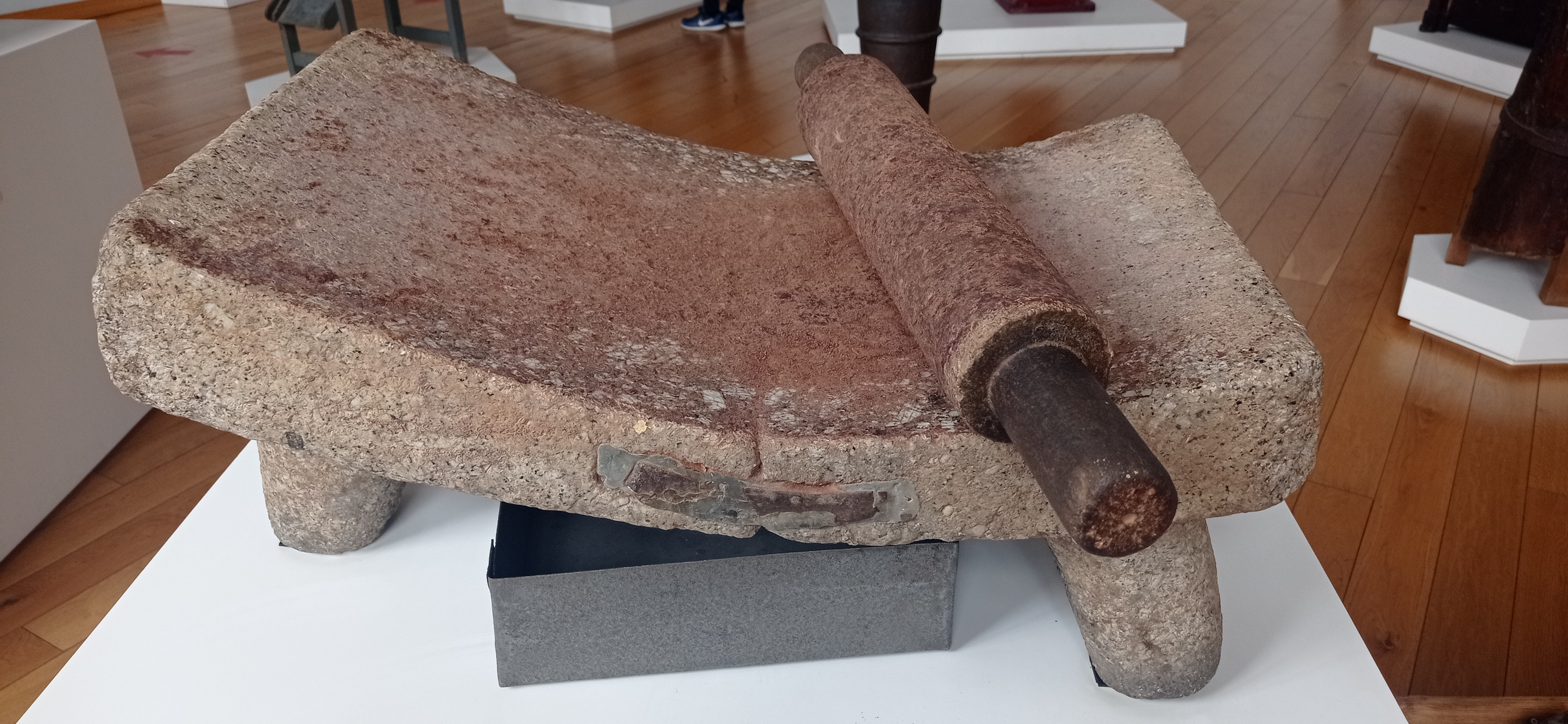
Metate and mano, used to grind the cassava

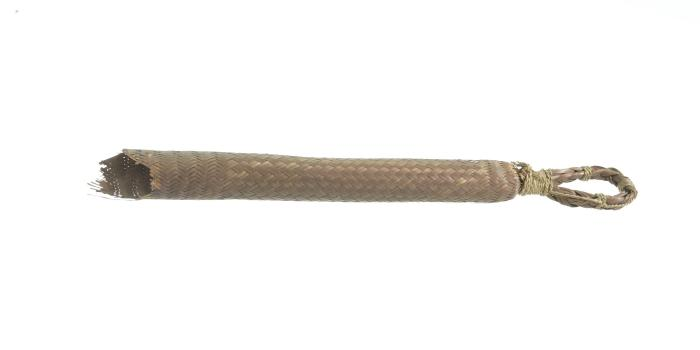
Matapi, used to extract the cassava juice

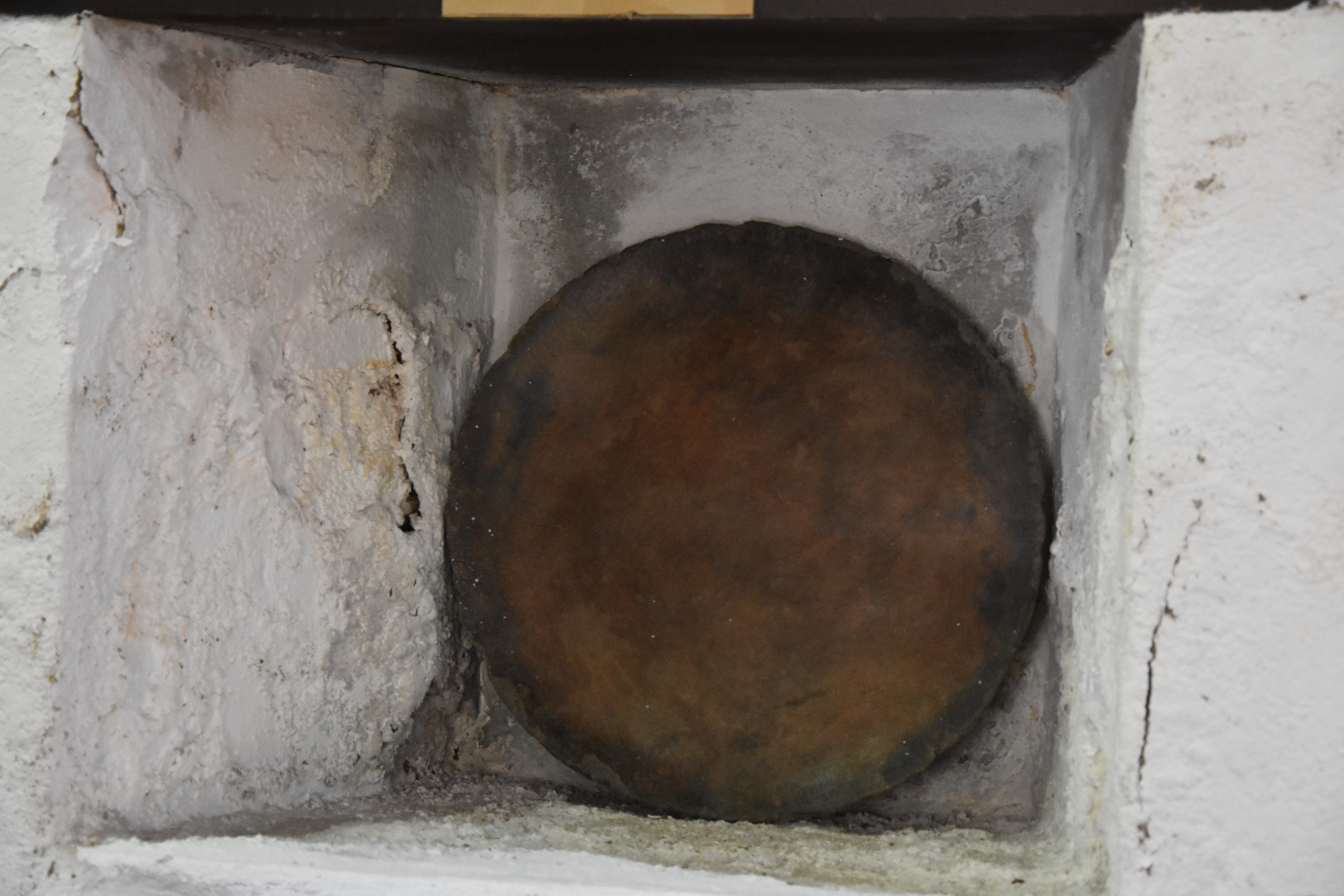
Burén, used to cook bammies and flatbreads

=== Preservation and production of Bammy ===
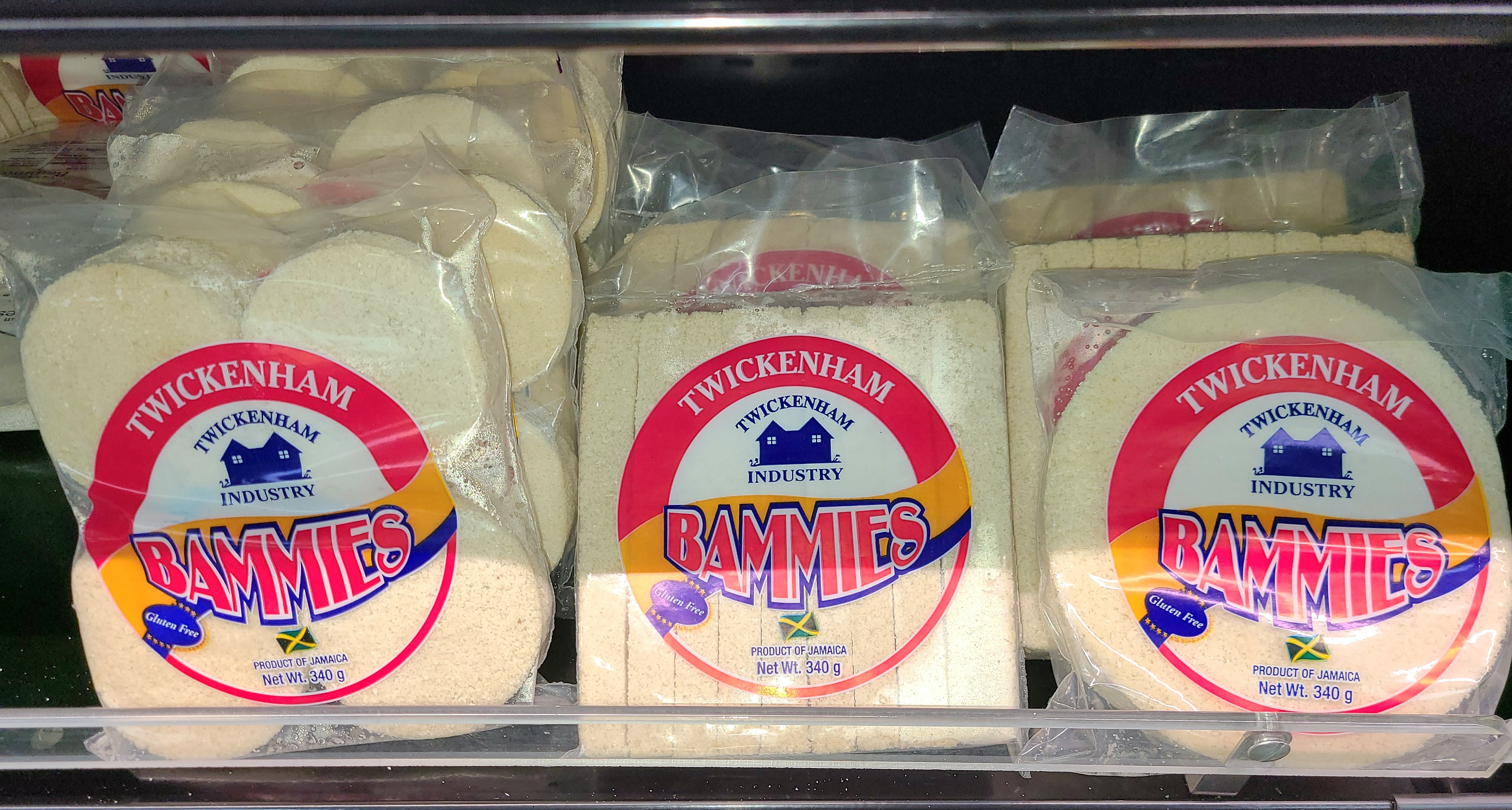
Typical bammies of different sizes produced and sold in Jamaica.

For centuries, it was the bread staple for rural Jamaicans until the cheaper, imported wheat flour breads became popular in the post-World War II era.

In the 1990s, the United Nations and the Jamaican government established a program to revive bammy production and to market it as a modern, convenient food product.

Bammies are currently produced and sold in supermarkets across Jamaica. Also, they are still sold in local markets, and prepared and served in many restaurants, especially seafood or beachside restaurants in Jamaica. Bammies are a traditional Lenten or Easter staple for Jamaicans.

== Preparation ==
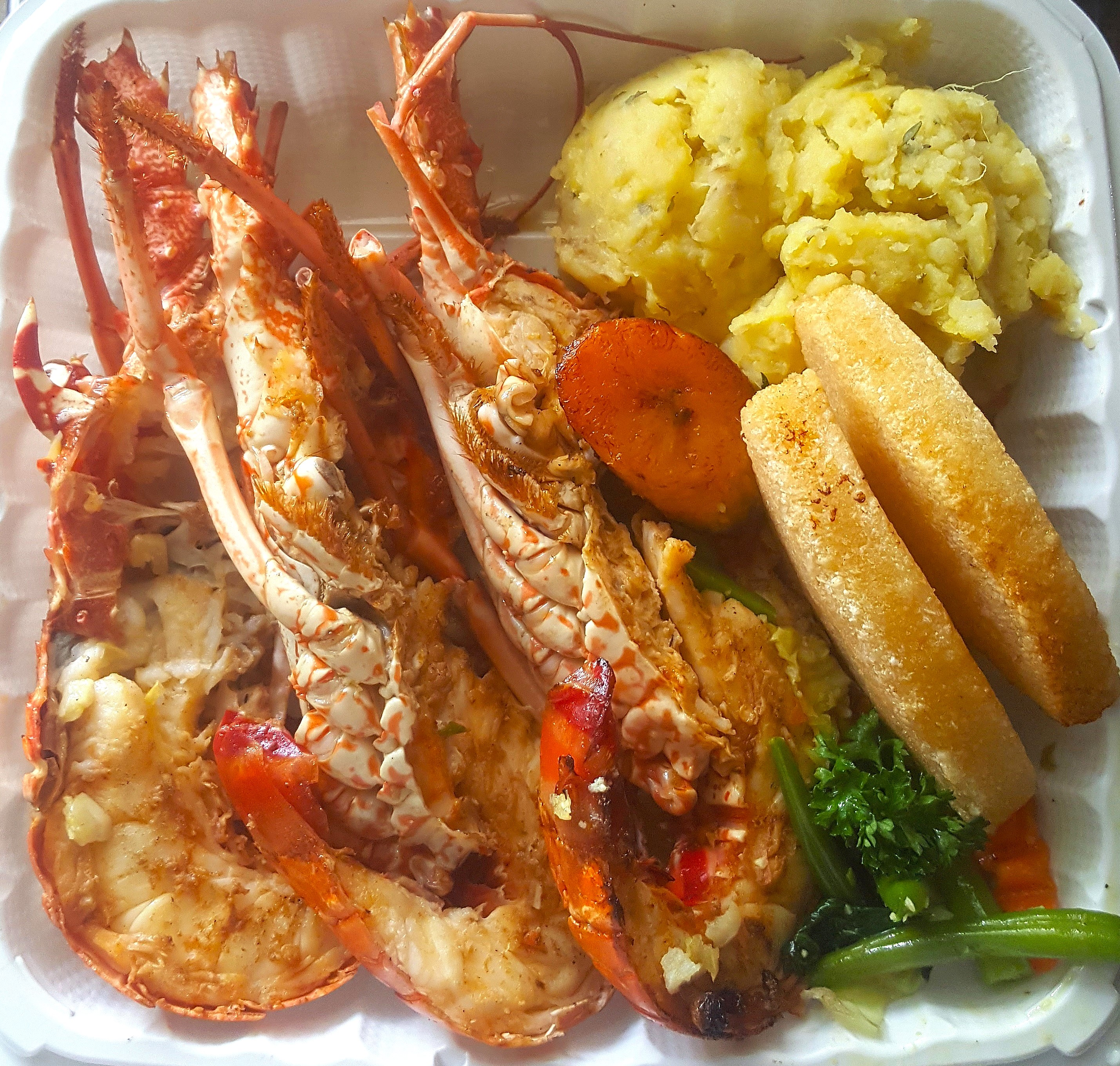
Seafood meal in Jamaica— garlic lobster with mashed sweet potato, stir-fry vegetables, fried bammy and fried ripe plantain. Bammy is typically served as a side dish with seafood.

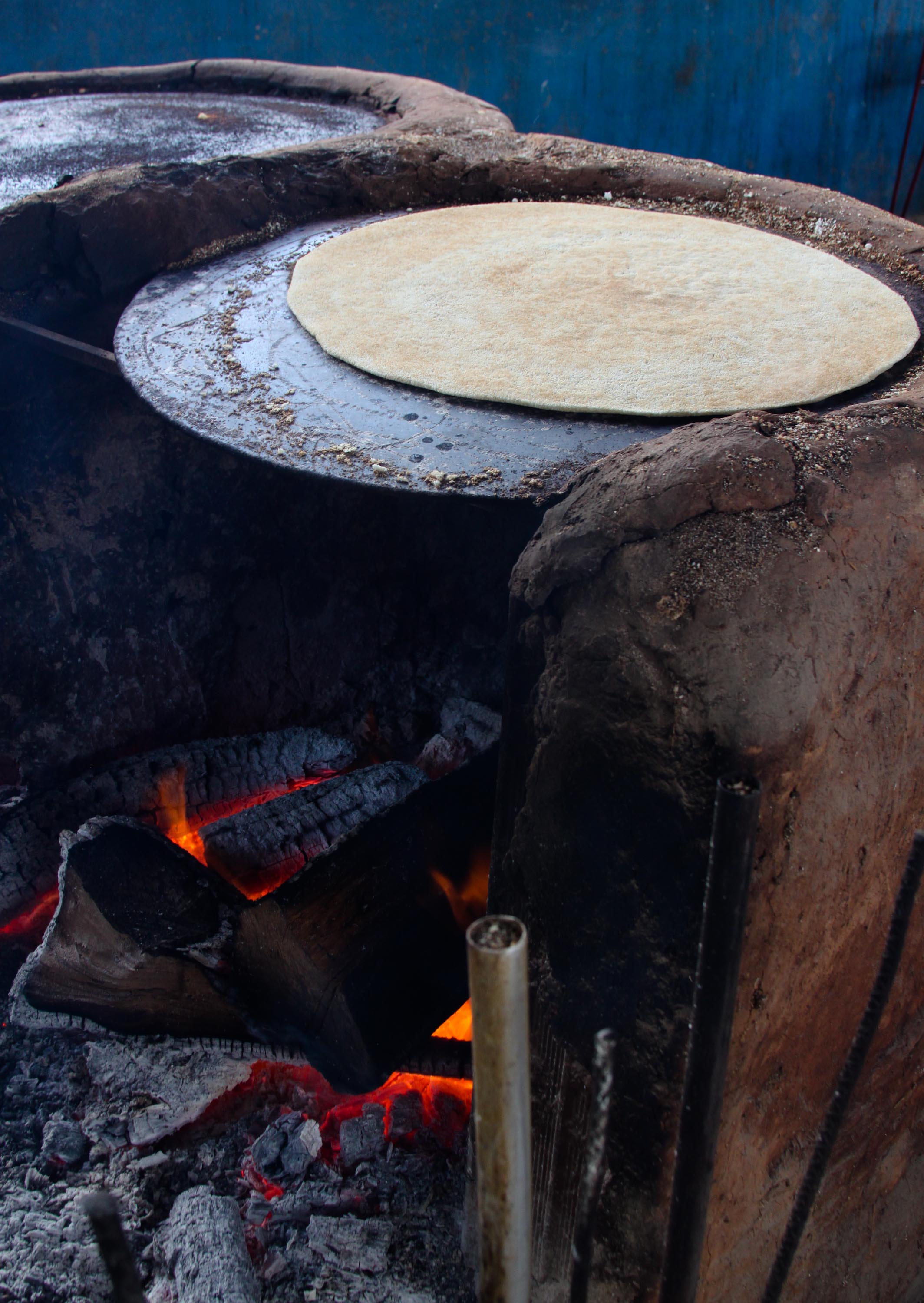
Casabe in Venezuela

Bammy is made from bitter cassava. Traditionally, the cassava is grated and placed in a press bag (woven with thatch leaves) and placed in an outdoor press where heavy stones are loaded on. Once completely drained, but still a bit moist, the cassava is beaten in a mortar then sieved to a fine flour texture. Salt is then added to taste.

The actual baking of bammies varies across Jamaican communities. Traditionally, it is made by spreading a handful of the flour evenly in a baking ring, on a flat iron griddle on the open fire, or in a Dutch pot. While baking, the top of the bammy is patted with a flat board and then turned over. The baking process takes about 3 minutes, and the final product is a thin, foldable bread about 10" in diameter. This is the Indigenous way of preparing casabe (bammy), which is similar to traditional tortillas of Mesoamerican cultures. It can then be eaten with whatever fillings are desired.

The more modern (and popular) approach is to bake thicker bammies about 6" in diameter. These are often mass-produced in factories. When home-baked, the flour may be store-bought or made by hand-pressing. The bammy can be baked on griddles or in baking pans on a stove top. Some choose to bake it inside an oven, and to add butter and other spices before baking. Baking takes longer due to the thickness, and the final product is then cut into halves or wedges for freezing. When ready to eat, the wedges are soaked in coconut milk and then fried until golden brown or steamed, and served with meat, fish, seafood, avocado, or other side dishes. Bammy, like festival, wheat bread and tortillas, are served anytime or consumed as a snack.

== Variations ==
Several variations of cassava bread and fried cassava are eaten in other islands like Cuba, the Dominican Republic and Haiti, where UNESCO has recognised cassava bread as an Intangible Heritage of Humanity. Fried cassava and cassava breads are common snacks in Brazil, where they are called tapioca, and casabe in Venezuela, Colombia, Ecuador, and several Central American countries including Panama, Belize, and Honduras. In St Vincent, cassava bread is called bambam or areba (the Garifuna word for "cassava-eaters"), and in Dominica, several types of cassava breads were made by the Kalinagos (another Arawakan-speaking subgroup).

== See also ==
- Pre-Columbian Jamaica
- Tapioca
- Coco bread
- Hard dough bread
- Bulla cake
- Jamaican cuisine
- Jamaican pepperpot soup
- Indigenous cuisine of the Americas
