= Hard dough bread =

Jamaican bread similar to the Pullman loaf or pain de mie

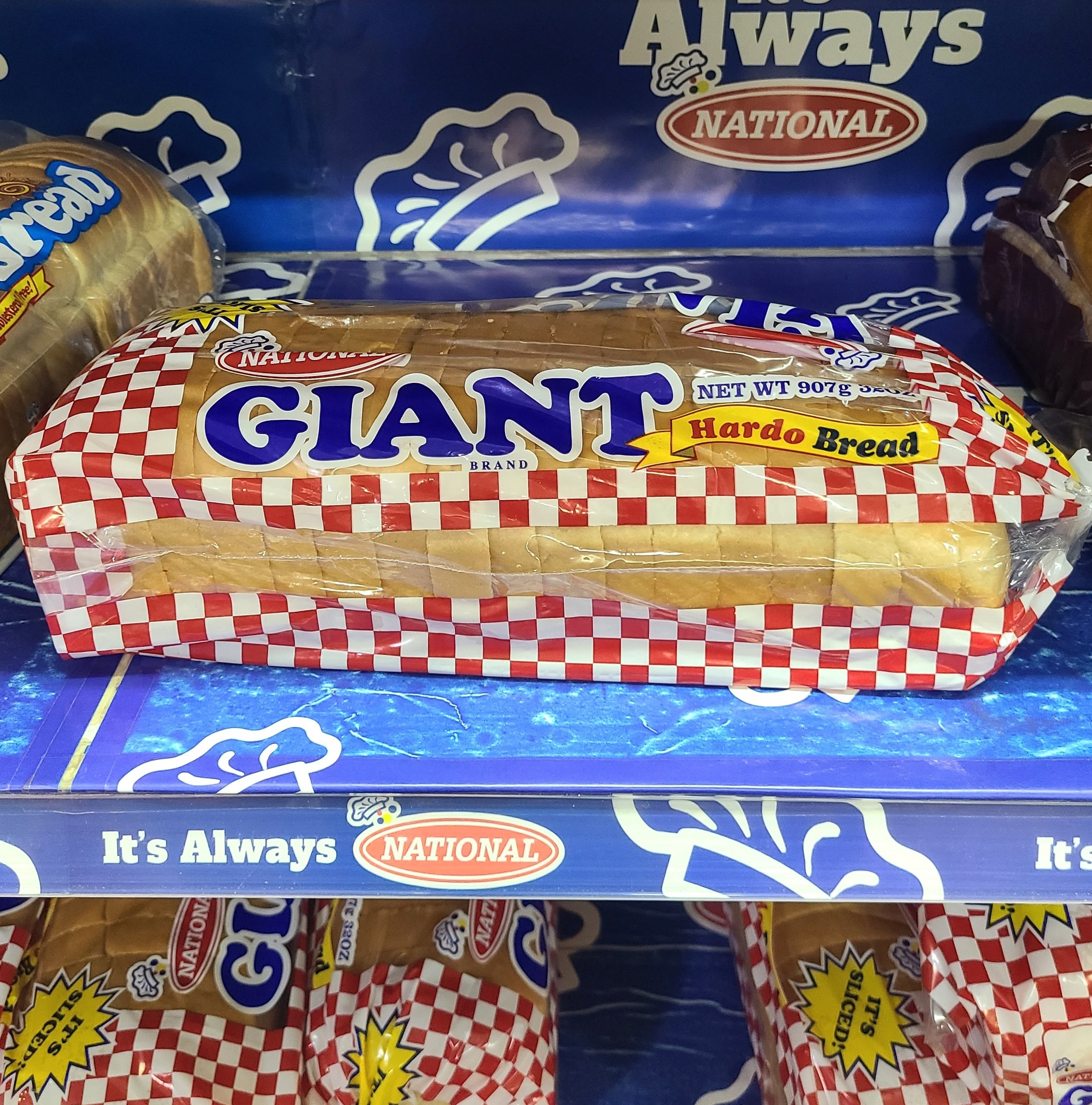
- Jamaican sliced hard dough bread
- Type: Bread
- Place of origin: Jamaica
- Main ingredients: Flour, water, yeast, salt, sugar

Hard dough bread, also called hardo bread, is a Jamaican bread similar to the Pullman loaf or pain de mie, although hard dough bread tends to be sweeter. The dough consists of flour, water, yeast, salt and sugar. Additional ingredients such as treacle, molasses, and vegetable shortening can be used. It typically has a dense consistency and is usually brushed with sugared water before baking. It is a staple food in Jamaican households.

Hard dough bread loaves are usually rectangular and can be bought sliced or unsliced. Despite being dense the bread is quite soft, and its exterior is glossy.

== History ==
The bread originated from Chinese indentured labourers who arrived in Jamaica by the mid-1800s (or subsequent immigrants), who brought the recipe to Jamaica. It is said to bear similarities to Chinese mantou, and other sweet breads which they introduced to the island. Their descendants, Chinese Jamaicans, have been predominantly operating grocery stores and bakeries across the island, which have been baking and selling hard dough bread commercially.

The earliest known use of the word "hard-dough" was in 1911, in the Daily Gleaner in Kingston, Jamaica. According to Jamaican writer and cultural historian, Olive Senior, traditionally the baking process involves a piece of mixing equipment called a dough break machine, which is only found in Jamaica, Cuba and Haiti.

== Usage ==
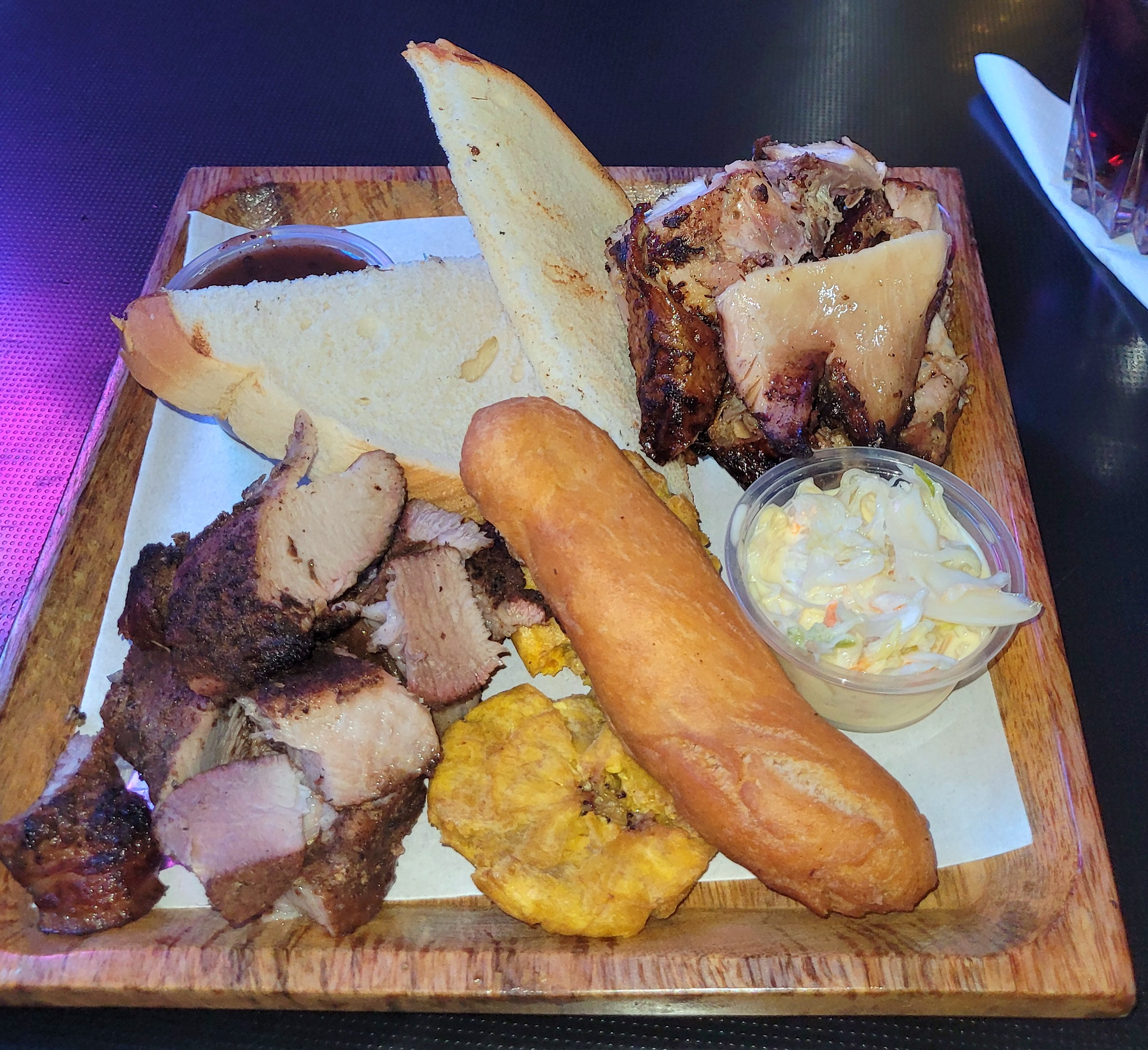
Jerk pork and chicken served with hard dough bread and other accompaniments, in Jamaica.

Hard dough bread is used like pain de mie or Pullman loaf— as a vehicle for spreads such as butter, cheese or jams, for dipping into liquids such as hot chocolate, or to make sandwiches. It is also commonly paired with various kinds of Jamaican porridges (like cornmeal, green banana, plantain, peanut etc.), and is eaten by breaking a slice into small chunks and adding them to the cooked porridge after serving. Hard dough bread's soft and slightly spongy consistency makes it more resistant than Pullman bread to becoming soggy and breaking apart in sandwiches with fried, greasy fillings such as plantain and egg. The bread may be eaten on its own or as a side dish with jerked meats.

== Variations ==
A common variation is softo or soft dough bread where milk is added to flour, similar to Japanese milk bread. Jamaican coco bread is a variation with similar consistency, made with coconut milk. Similarly, Jamaican grotto bread is dense, but slightly sweet and milky in taste. Jamaican duck bread and mongoose bread are traditional variations of hard dough bread.

== See also ==
- Bulla cake
- Bammy
- Coco bread
- Twisted doughnuts
- Festivals
- Jamaican cuisine
- List of breads
- List of Jamaican dishes
