= List of vegetables =

This is a list of plants that have a culinary role as vegetables. "Vegetable" can be used in several senses, including culinary, botanical and legal. This list includes fruit vegetables such as cucumbers, eggplants, okra, peppers, pumpkins, squash and tomatoes. It does not include herbs, spices, cereals, culinary fruits, culinary nuts, edible fungi.

Legal vegetables are defined for regulatory, tax and other purposes. An example would include the tomato, which is botanically a berry (fruit), but culinarily a vegetable according to the United States.

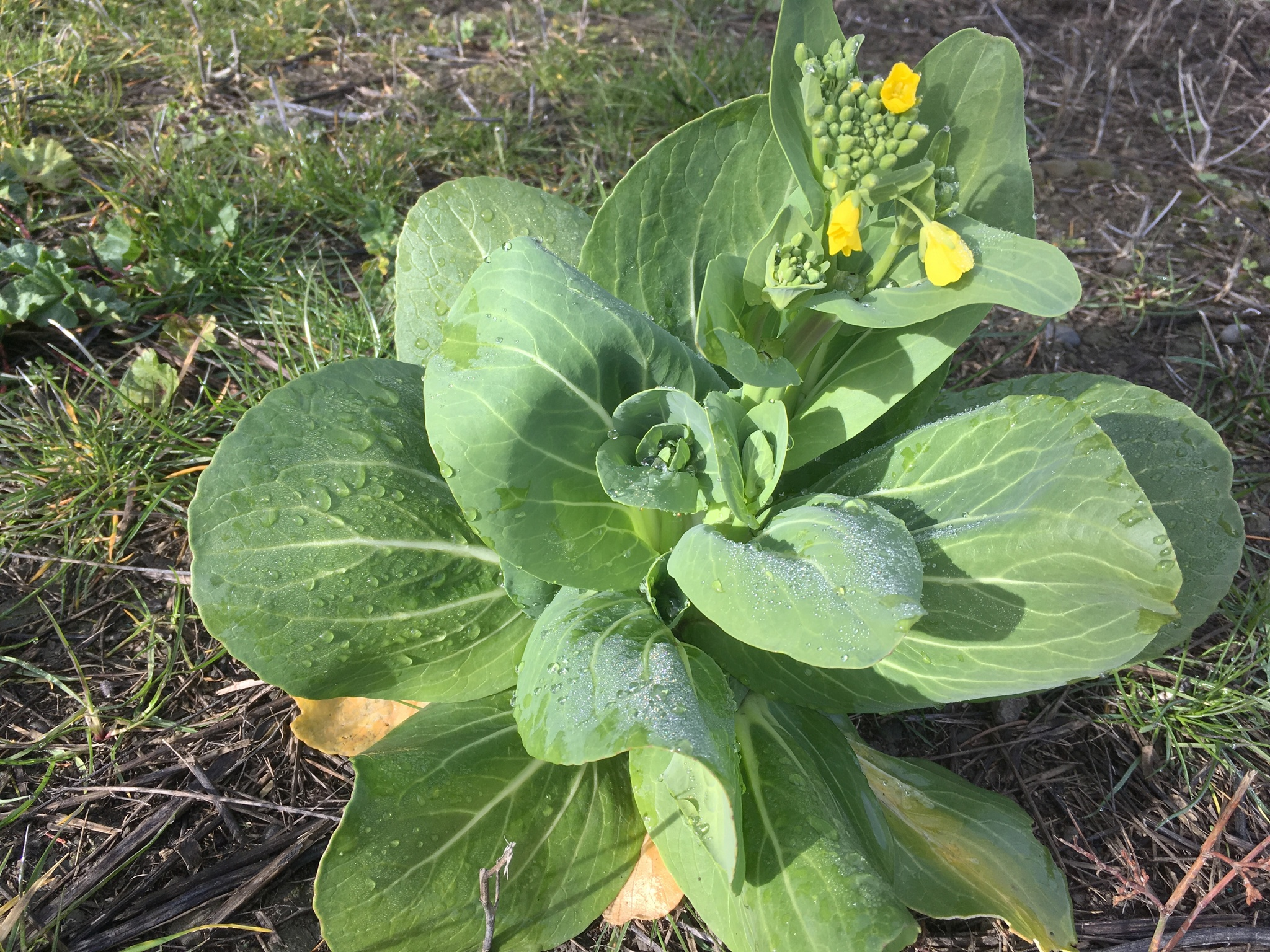
Bok choy or Chinese cabbage in flower

== Leafy and salad vegetables ==
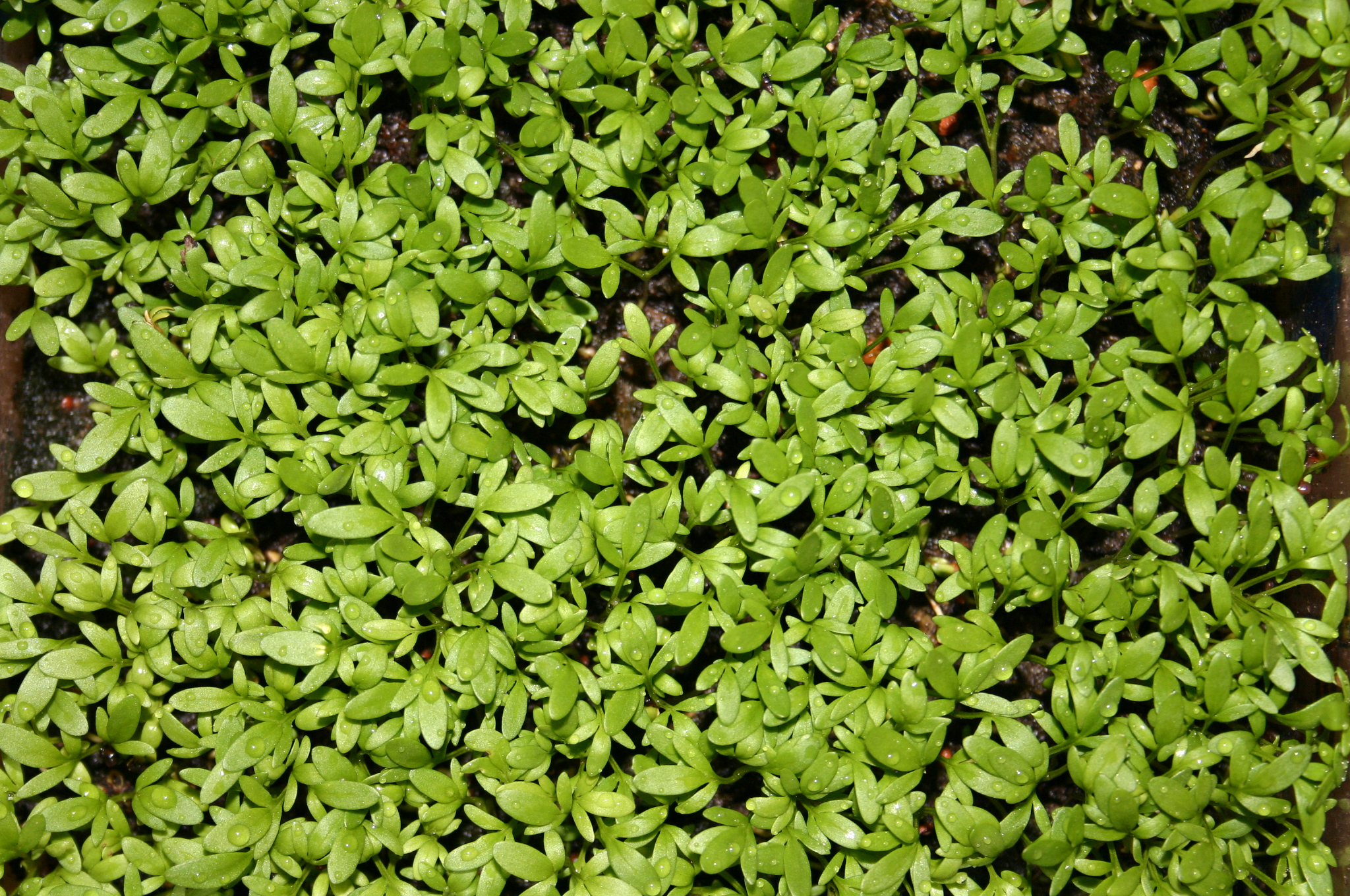
Garden Cress

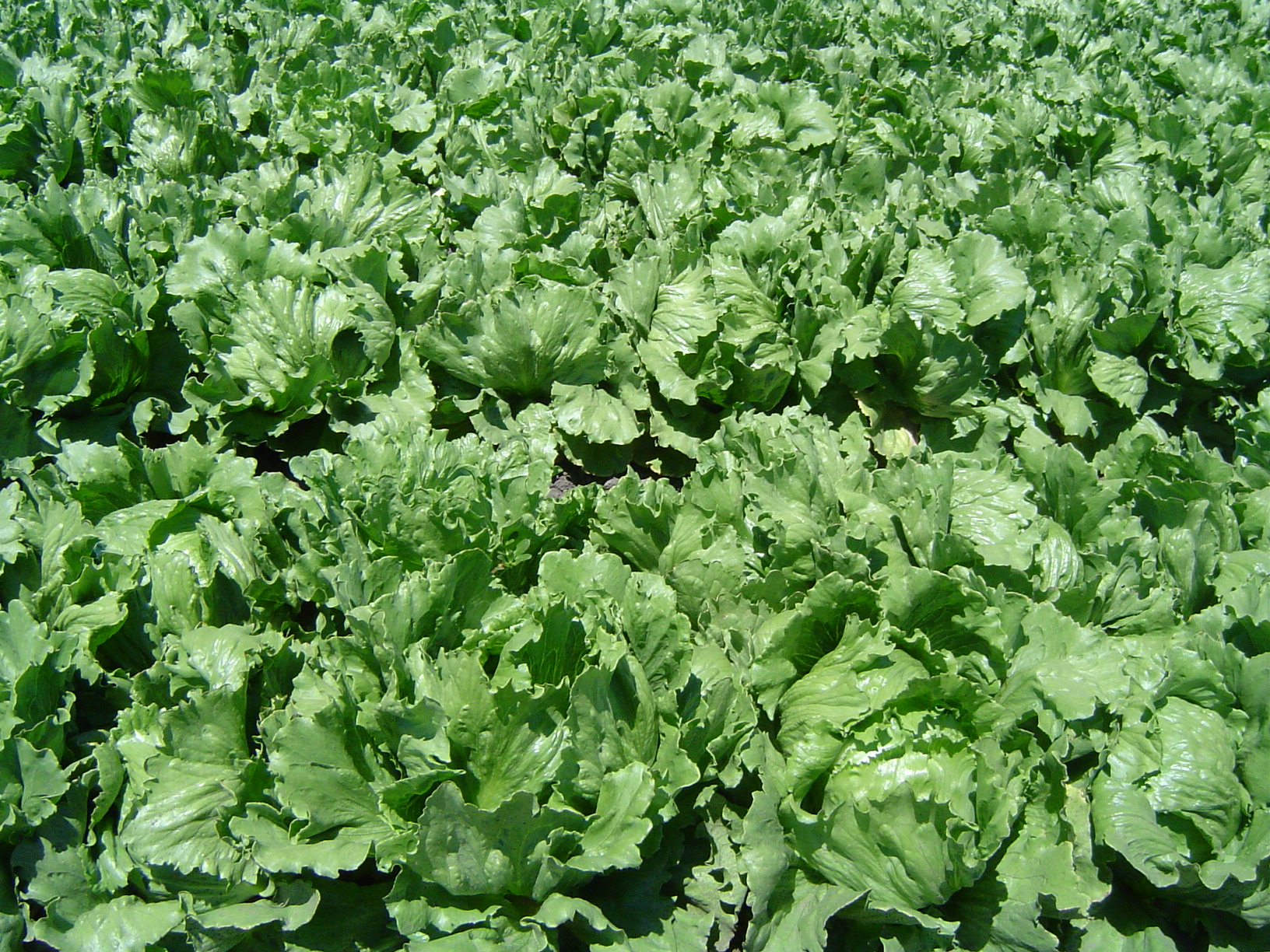
Iceberg lettuce field in northern Santa Barbara County.

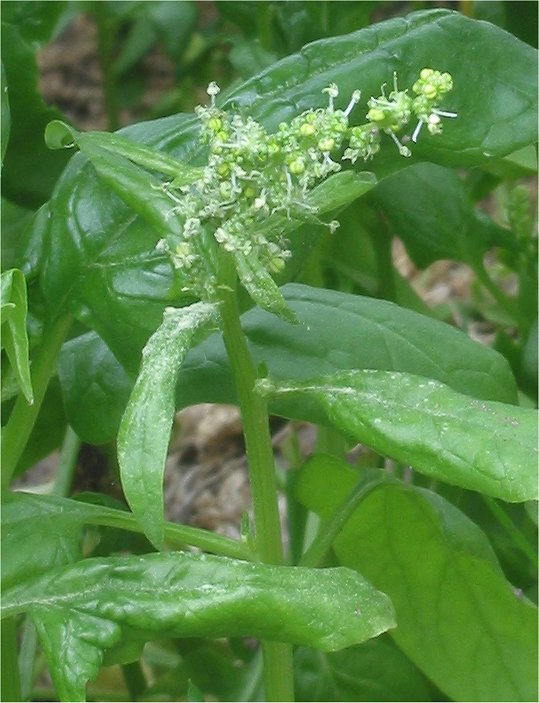
Spinach in flower

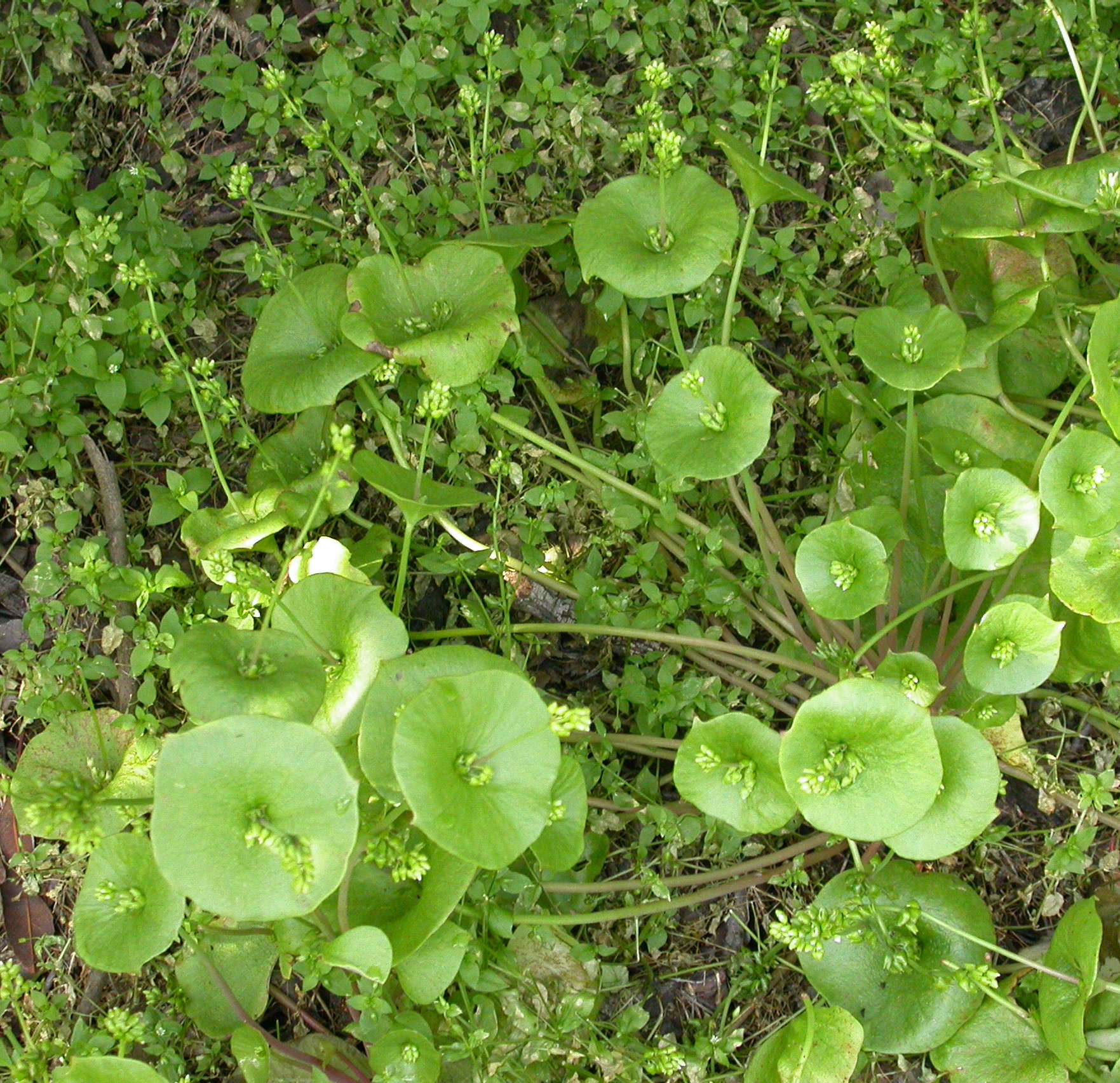
Miner's lettuce

Vernacular name	Species name
Arrowhead elephant ear	Xanthosoma sagittifolium
Asiatic pennywort	Centella asiatica
Arugula	Eruca sativa, Diplotaxis tenuifolia
Atibulnak	Rubus pectinellus
Beet greens	Beta vulgaris vulgaris
Binung	Christella dentata
Carrot greens	Daucus carota
Bok choy (白菜)	Brassica rapa (chinensis)
Borage greens	Borago officinalis
Broccoli (leaves/stalks)	Brassica oleracea
Brooklime	Veronica beccabunga
Brussels sprouts	Brassica oleracea (gemmifera)
Cabbage	Brassica oleracea (capitata)
Caraway leaves	Carum carvi
Catsear	Hypochaeris radicata
Celery	Apium graveolens
Celtuce	Lactuca sativa (asparagina)
Ceylon hydrolea	Hydrolea zeylanica
Chaya	Cnidoscolus aconitifolius aconitifolius
Chili pepper leaves	Capsicum spp.
Chickweed	Stellaria
Chicory	Cichorium intybus
Chinese mallow	Malva verticillata
Collard greens	Brassica oleracea
Common purslane	Portulaca oleracea
Corn salad	Valerianella locusta
Cress	Lepidium sativum
Cucumis prophetarum	Cucumis prophetarum
Garland Chrysanthemum	Chrysanthemum coronarium
Ground elder	Aegopodium podagraria
Dandelion	Taraxacum officinale
Dill	Anethum graveolens
Endive	Cichorium endivia
Fat hen	Chenopodium album
Fiddlehead	Pteridium aquilinum, Athyrium esculentum
Fluted pumpkin	Telfairia occidentalis
Gnetum / Melinjo	Gnetum gnemon
Golden samphire	Inula crithmoides
Good King Henry	Chenopodium bonus-henricus
Gooseweed	Sphenoclea zeylanica
Grape (leaves)	Vitis
Hana-ikada	Helwingia japonica
Greater plantain	Plantago major
Jute mallow (Melokhia)	Corchorus olitorius, Corchorus capsularis
Kai-lan (芥蘭 Gai lan)	Brassica rapa (alboglabra)
Kale	Brassica oleracea (acephala)
Kalette	Brassica oleracea
Kerguelen cabbage	Pringlea antiscorbutica
Komatsuna	Brassica rapa var. perviridis
Kuka	Adansonia
Kulekhara	Hygrophila auriculata
Lagos bologi	Talinum fruticosum
Lamb's lettuce	Valerianella locusta
Lamb's quarters	Chenopodium album
Land cress	Barbarea verna
Leaf celery	Apium graveolens var. secalinum
Lettuce	Lactuca sativa
Lizard's tail	Houttuynia cordata
Malabar spinach	Basella alba
Mallow	Malva sylvestris
Moringa leaves	Moringa oleifera
Miner's lettuce (Winter purslane)	Claytonia perfoliata
Mizuna greens	Brassica rapa (nipposinica)
Mustard	Sinapis alba
Napa cabbage	Brassica rapa (pekinensis)
Netted adder's-tongue	Ophioglossum reticulatum
New Zealand spinach	Tetragonia tetragonioides
Orache	Atriplex hortensis
Papaya leaves	Carica papaya
Paracress	Acmella oleracea
Pea (sprouts/leaves)	Lathyrus oleraceus
Pitogo	Cycas riuminiana
Poke	Phytolacca americana
Purple bauhinia/Butterfly tree	Bauhinia purpurea
Radicchio	Cichorium intybus
Rapini (broccoli rabe)	Brassica rapa rapa
Red spinach	Amaranthus dubius
Royal fern	Osmunda regalis
Sabah snake grass	Clinacanthus nutans
Samphire	Crithmum maritimum
Sculpit/Stridolo	Silene inflata
Sea beet	Beta vulgaris maritima
Sea kale	Crambe maritima
Shepherd's purse	Capsella bursa-pastoris
Sierra Leone bologi	Crassocephalum biafrae
Soko	Celosia argentea
Sorrel	Rumex acetosa
Sour cabbage	Brassica oleracea
Spinach	Spinacia oleracea
Spiny amaranth	Amaranthus spinosus
Summer purslane	Portulaca oleracea
Sunset muskmallow	Abelmoschus manihot
Sweet potato leaves	Ipomoea batatas
Swiss chard	Beta vulgaris cicla (flavescens)
Tahitian spinach	Xanthosoma brasiliense
Taro leaves	Colocasia esculenta
Tatsoi	Brassica rapa (rosularis)
Turnip greens	Brassica rapa (rapifera)
Vegetable fern	Diplazium esculentum
Vegetable hummingbird	Sesbania grandiflora
Viagra palm	Calamus erectus
Watercress	Nasturtium officinale
Water spinach	Ipomoea aquatica
Wheatgrass	Triticum aestivum
Yarrow	Achillea millefolium
Yao choy (油菜 Yu choy)	Brassica napus

== Fruit vegetables ==
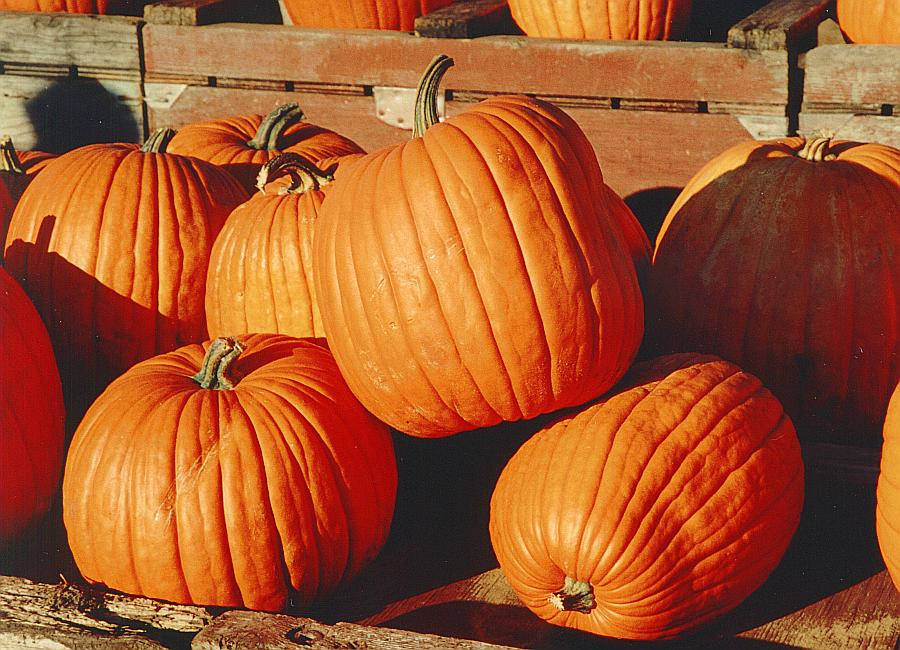
Pumpkins

	Species name
Armenian cucumber	Cucumis melo var. flexuosus
Butternut squash	Cucurbita moschata
Bitter melon / Bitter gourd	Momordica charantia
Caigua / Achocha	Cyclanthera pedata
Calabash / Bottle gourd	Lagenaria siceraria
Calabaza / West Indian pumpkin	Cucurbita moschata
Chayote	Sicyos edulis
Corn/Maize	Zea mays
Gac	Momordica cochinchinensis
Galo	Anacolosa frutescens
Cucamelon / Mouse melon	Melothria scabra
Cucumber	Cucumis sativus
Cucumis prophetarum	Cucumis prophetarum
Eggplant / Aubergine / Brinjal	Solanum melongena
Ivy gourd	Coccinia grandis
Kabocha	Cucurbita maxima
Kiwano / Horned melon	Cucumis metuliferus
Kapas-kapas	Telosma procumbens
Luffa	Luffa cylindrica
Pumpkin	Cucurbita
Pointed gourd	Trichosanthes dioica
Ridged gourd	Luffa acutangula
Snake gourd	Trichosanthes cucumerina
Spine gourd / Kantola	Momordica dioica
Spaghetti Squash
Squash	Cucurbita
Tinda	Praecitrullus fistulosus
Tipuho	Artocarpus treculianus
Tomatillo	Physalis philadelphica
Tomato	Solanum lycopersicum
West Indian gherkin	Cucumis anguria
Water melon	Citrullus lanatus
Winter melon	Benincasa hispida
Zucchini / Courgette / Marrow	Cucurbita pepo

=== Chili peppers ===
	Species name
Bell pepper	Capsicum annuum 'Bell'
Big Jim pepper	Capsicum annuum New Mexico Group
Cayenne pepper	Capsicum annuum 'Cayenne'
Friggitello	Capsicum annuum 'Friggitello'
Habanero	Capsicum chinense 'Habanero'
Hungarian wax pepper	Capsicum annuum 'Hungarian'
Jalapeño	Capsicum annuum 'Jalapeño'
New Mexico chile	Capsicum annuum New Mexico Group
Peperoncino	Capsicum annuum and Capsicum frutescens
Pimiento	Capsicum annuum 'Pimiento'
Sandia pepper	Capsicum annuum New Mexico Group
Siling haba	Capsicum annuum 'Siling haba'

== Edible flowers ==
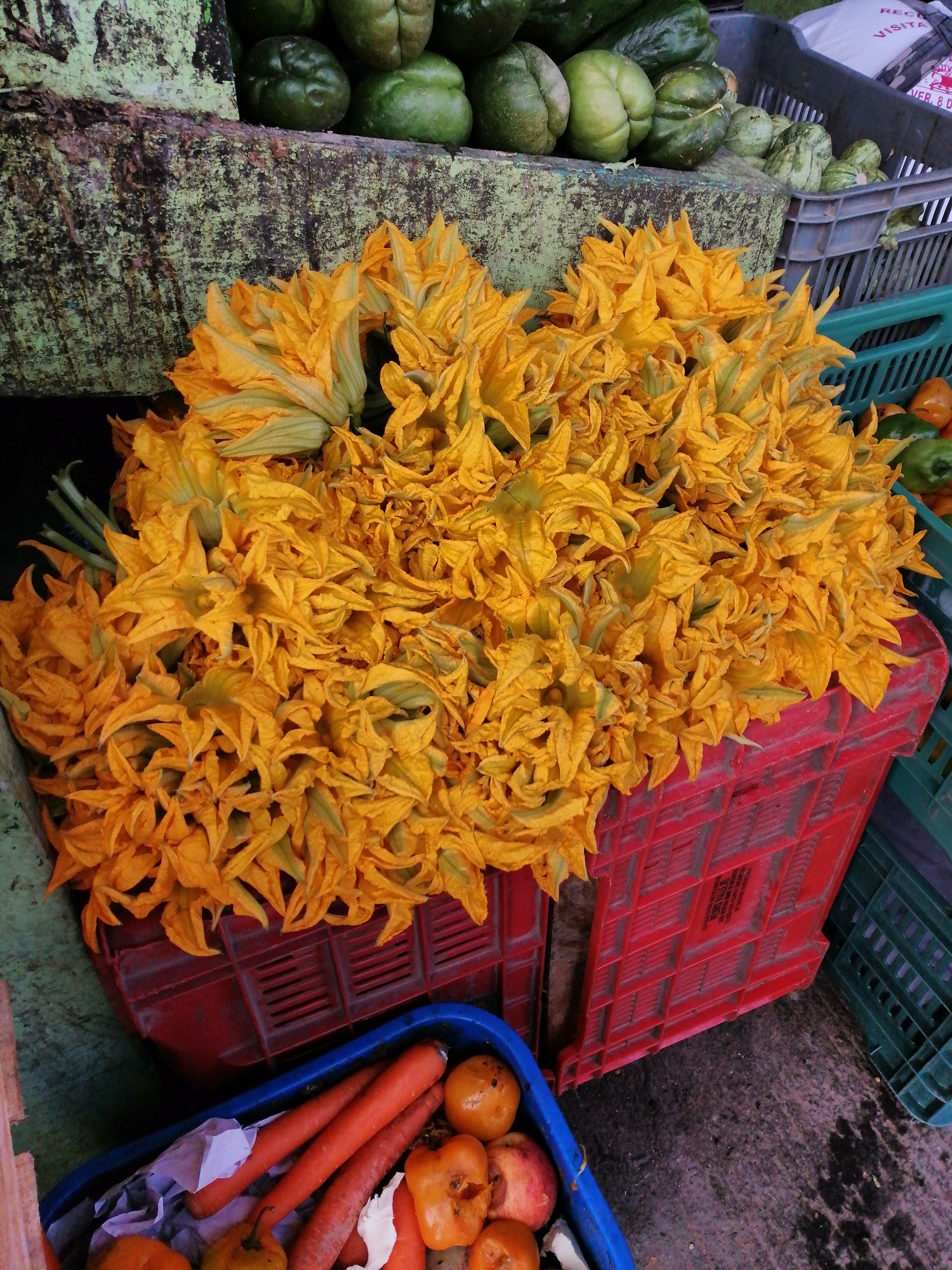
Calabaza flowers

	Species name
Artichoke	Cynara cardunculus / scolymus
Banana flower	Musa × paradisiaca, Musa acuminata, usa balibisiana, other bananas
Blue pea / Asian pigeonwings	Clitoria ternatea
Broccoli	Brassica oleracea
Broccolini flowers	Brassica oleracea
Calabaza flower	Cucurbita moschata
Caper	Capparis spinosa
Cauliflower	Brassica oleracea
Kapas-kapas	Telosma procumbens
Himbabao	Broussonetia luzonica
Pumpkin flower	Cucurbita
Purple bauhinia / Butterfly tree	Bauhinia purpurea
Daylily	Hemerocallis fulva
Jade vine / Tayabak	Srtongylodon macrobotrys
Loroco	Echites panduratus
Moringa	Moringa oleifera
Vegetable hummingbird	Sesbania grandiflora
Waterblommetjie	Aponogeton distachyos
Courgette flowers	Cucurbita
Squash blossoms	Cucurbita

== Podded vegetables ==
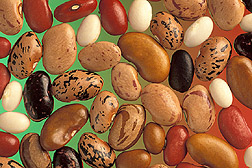
"Common bean", "kidney bean", "haricot bean", "pinto bean", "navy bean", and "green bean" are all varieties of the species Phaseolus vulgaris.

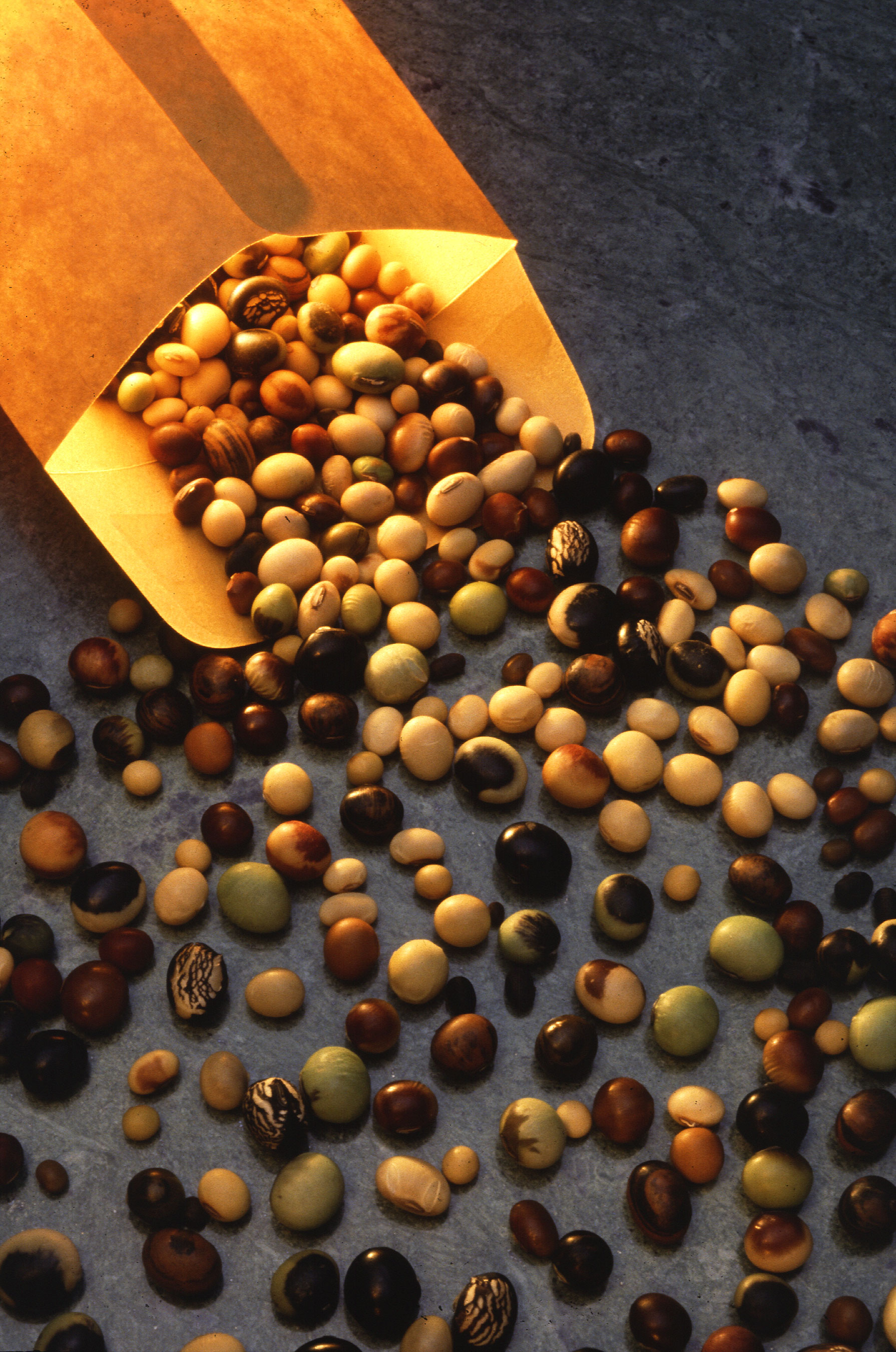
Varieties of soybeans are used for many purposes.

	Species name
American groundnut	Apios americana
Asparagus bean	Vigna unguiculata (sesquipedalis)
Azuki bean	Vigna angularis
Black-eyed pea	Vigna unguiculata unguiculata
Blue pea / Asian pigeonwings	Clitoria ternatea
Chickpea / Garbanzo	Cicer arietinum
Common bean	Phaseolus vulgaris
Devil's Claw	Proboscidea louisianica
Drumstick	Moringa oleifera
Dolichos bean	Lablab purpureus
Fava bean	Vicia faba
Green bean (French bean)	Phaseolus vulgaris
Guar	Cyamopsis tetragonoloba
Horse gram	Macrotyloma uniflorum
Hyacinth bean	Lablab purpureus
Indian pea	Lathyrus sativus
Lentil	Lens culinaris
Lima bean	Phaseolus lunatus
Moth bean	Vigna acontifolia
Mung bean	Vigna radiata
Okra	Abelmoschus esculentus
Pea	Pisum sativum
Peanut	Arachis hypogaea
Pigeon pea	Cajanus cajan
Ricebean	Vigna umbellata
Runner bean	Phaseolus coccineus
Snap pea (sugarsnap, mangetout)	Pisum sativum (macrocarpon)
Snow pea (mangetout)	Pisum sativum (saccharatum)
Soybean	Glycine max
Tarwi (Tarhui / Chocho)	Lupinus mutabilis
Tepary bean	Phaseolus acutifolius
Urad bean	Vigna mungo
Velvet bean	Mucuna pruriens
Winged bean	Psophocarpus tetragonolobus

== Bulb and stem vegetables ==
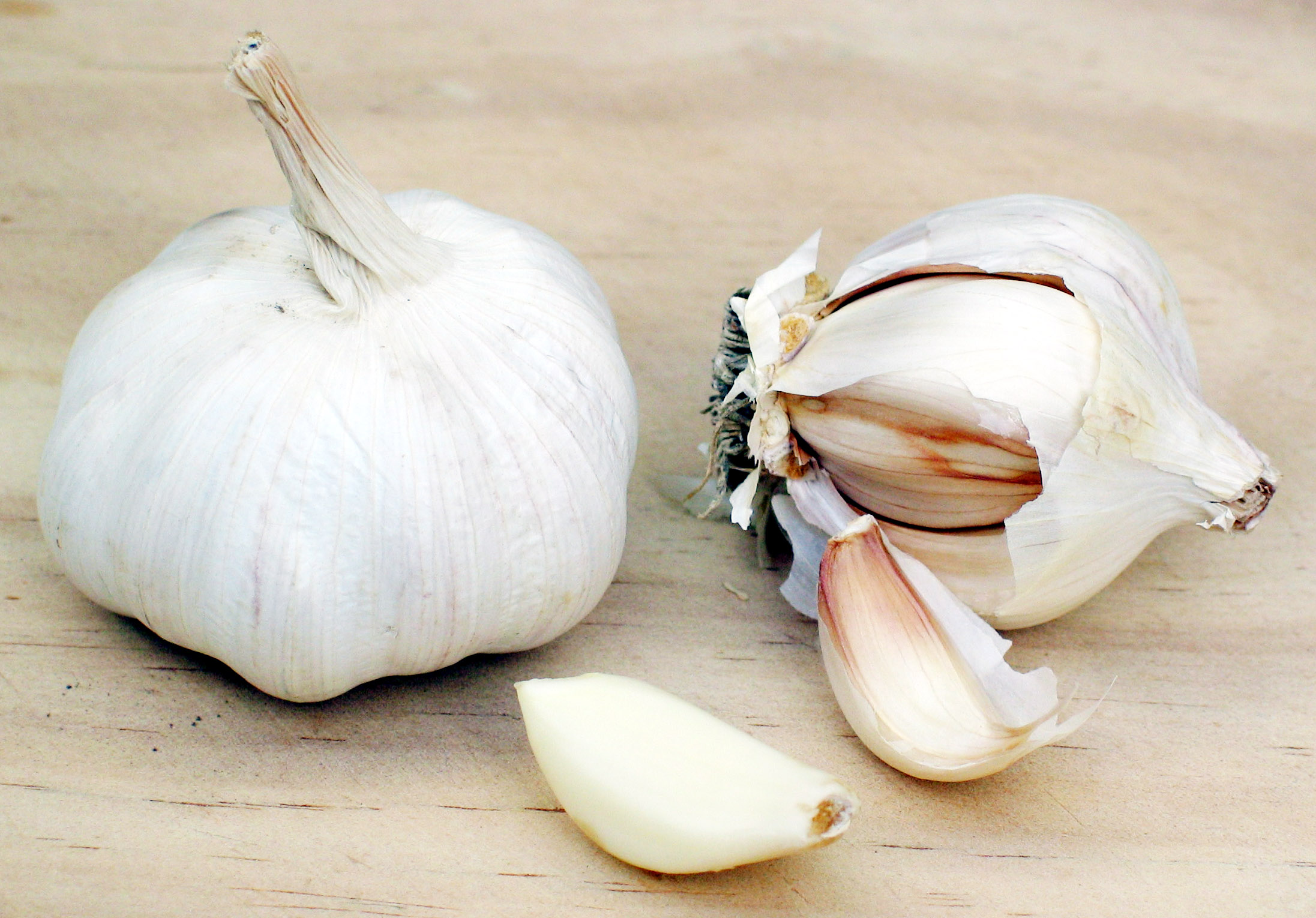
Garlic bulbs and individual cloves, one peeled.

	Species name
Asparagus	Asparagus officinalis
Banana pith	Musa × paradisiaca, Musa acuminata, Musa balibisian, other bananas
Broomrape shoot	Orobanche crenata
Cardoon	Cynara cardunculus
Celeriac	Apium graveolens (rapaceum)
Celery	Apium graveolens
Chives	Allium schoenoprasum
Common Horsetail	Equisetum arvense
Elephant garlic	Allium ampeloprasum (ampeloprasum)
Florence fennel	Foeniculum vulgare (dulce)
Garlic	Allium sativum
Garlic chives	Allium tuberosum
Heart of palm	Cocos nucifera, Euterpe spp., Sabal spp., Bactris gasipaes, Deckenia nobilis, other palms
Kohlrabi	Brassica oleracea (gongylodes)
Kurrat	Allium ampeloprasum (kurrat)
Landang	Corypha spp.
Lemongrass	Cymbopogon citratus
Leek	Allium porrum
Lotus root	Nelumbo nucifera
Nopal	Opuntia ficus-indica
Onion	Allium cepa
Pearl onion	Allium ampeloprasum (sectivum)
Potato onion	Allium cepa (aggregatum)
Prussian asparagus	Ornithogalum pyrenaicum
Rampion	Campanula rapunculus
Sago	Metroxylon sagu, Cycas revoluta
Spring onion / Scallion	Allium wakegi
Sea beans / samphire greens	Salicornia spp.
Shallot	Allium cepa (aggregatum)
Tree onion	Allium × proliferum
Welsh onion	Allium fistulosum
Wild leek	Allium tricoccum
Manchurian wild rice	Zizania latifolia

== Root and tuberous vegetables ==
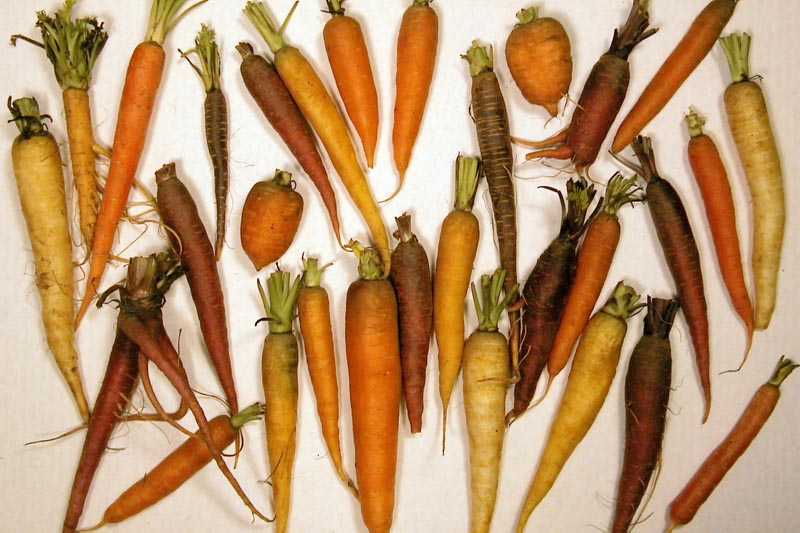
Carrots come in a variety of shapes, sizes and colors.

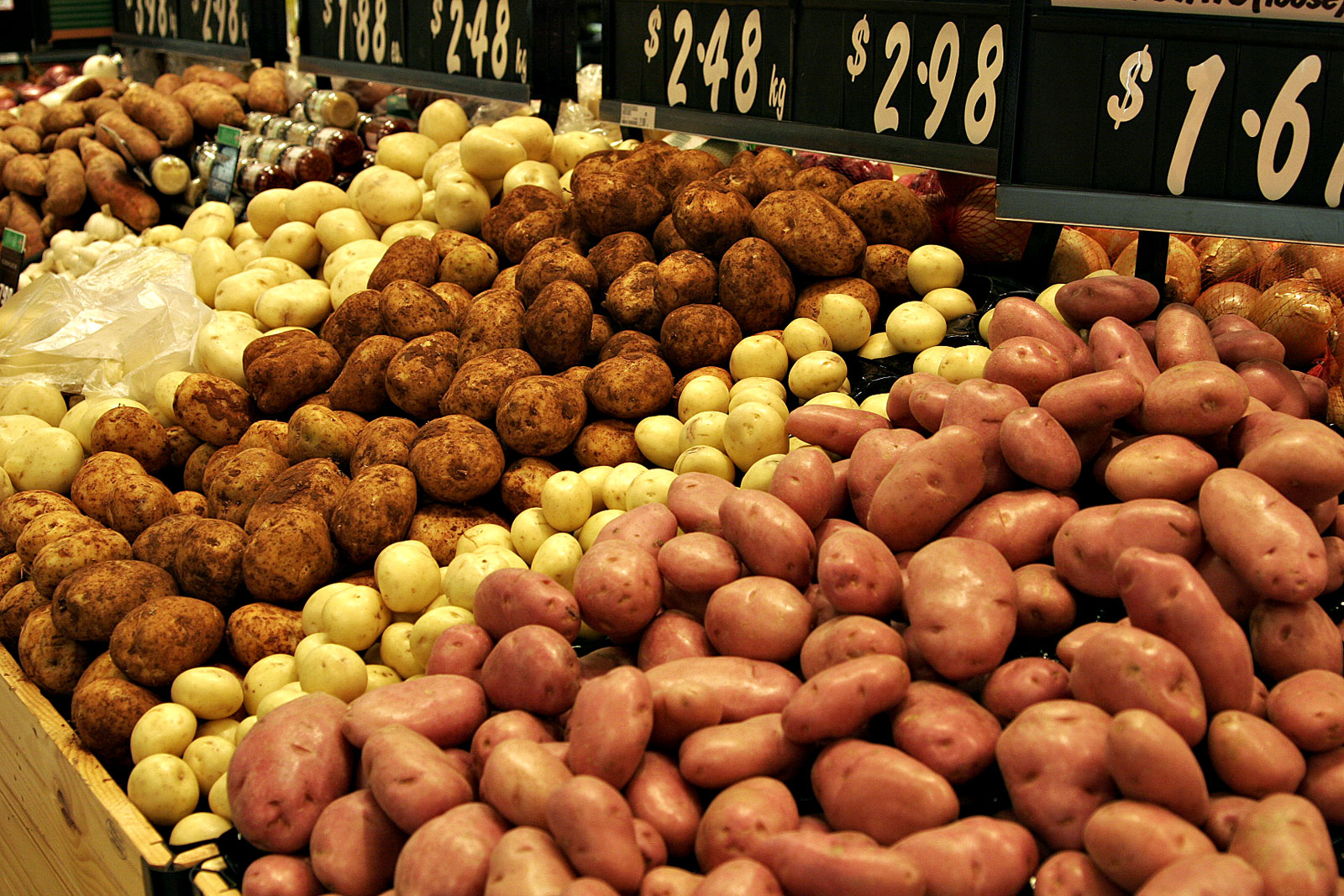
The potato is one of the world's staple foods.

	Species name
Ahipa	Pachyrhizus ahipa
Arracacha	Arracacia xanthorrhiza
Arrowroot	Maranta arundinacea
Arrowleaf elephant ear	Xanthosoma sagittifolium
Bamboo shoot	Bambusa vulgaris, Phyllostachys edulis
Beetroot	Beta vulgaris vulgaris
Burdock	Arctium lappa
Broadleaf arrowhead	Sagittaria latifolia
Camas	Camassia
Canna	Canna
Carrot	Daucus carota
Cassumunar ginger	Zingiber cassumunar
Cassava	Manihot esculenta
Chinese artichoke	Stachys affinis
Chinese ginger	Boesenbergia rotunda
Daikon	Raphanus sativus (longipinnatus)
Deodeok	Codonopsis lanceolata
Doraji	Platycodon grandiflorus
Earthnut pea	Lathyrus tuberosus
Elephant foot yam	Amorphophallus paeoniifolius
Ensete	Ensete ventricosum
Giant swamp taro	Cyrtosperma merkusii
Giant taro	Alocasia macrorrhizos
Ginger	Zingiber officinale
Hamburg parsley	Petroselinum crispum tuberosum
Horseradish	Armoracia rusticana
Jandae	Adenophora triphylla
Jerusalem artichoke	Helianthus tuberosus
Jícama	Pachyrhizus erosus
Kencur	Kaempferia galanga
Lengkuas (Greater galangal)	Alpinia galanga
Lesser galangal	Alpinia officinarum
Mashua	Tropaeolum tuberosum
Oca	Oxalis tuberosa
Palmyra sprout	Borassus flabellifer
Parsnip	Pastinaca sativa
Pignut	Conopodium majus
Polynesian arrowroot / East Indian arrowroot	Tacca leontopetaloides
Potato	Solanum tuberosum
Prairie turnip	Pediomelum esculentum
Radish	Raphanus sativus
Rutabaga (Swede)	Brassica napus (napobrassica)
Salsify	Tragopogon porrifolius
Scorzonera	Scorzonera hispanica
Skirret	Sium sisarum
Sweet potato (Kumara)	Ipomoea batatas
Taro	Colocasia esculenta
Ti	Cordyline fruticosa
Tigernut	Cyperus esculentus
Turmeric	Curcuma longa
Turnip	Brassica rapa (rapifera)
Ube (Purple yam)	Dioscorea alata
Ulluco	Ullucus tuberosus
Wasabi	Wasabia japonica
Water caltrop	Trapa natans, Trapa bicornis
Water chestnut	Eleocharis dulcis
Yacón	Smallanthus sonchifolius
Yam	Dioscorea
Yautia horqueta	Xanthosoma caracu

== Sea vegetables ==
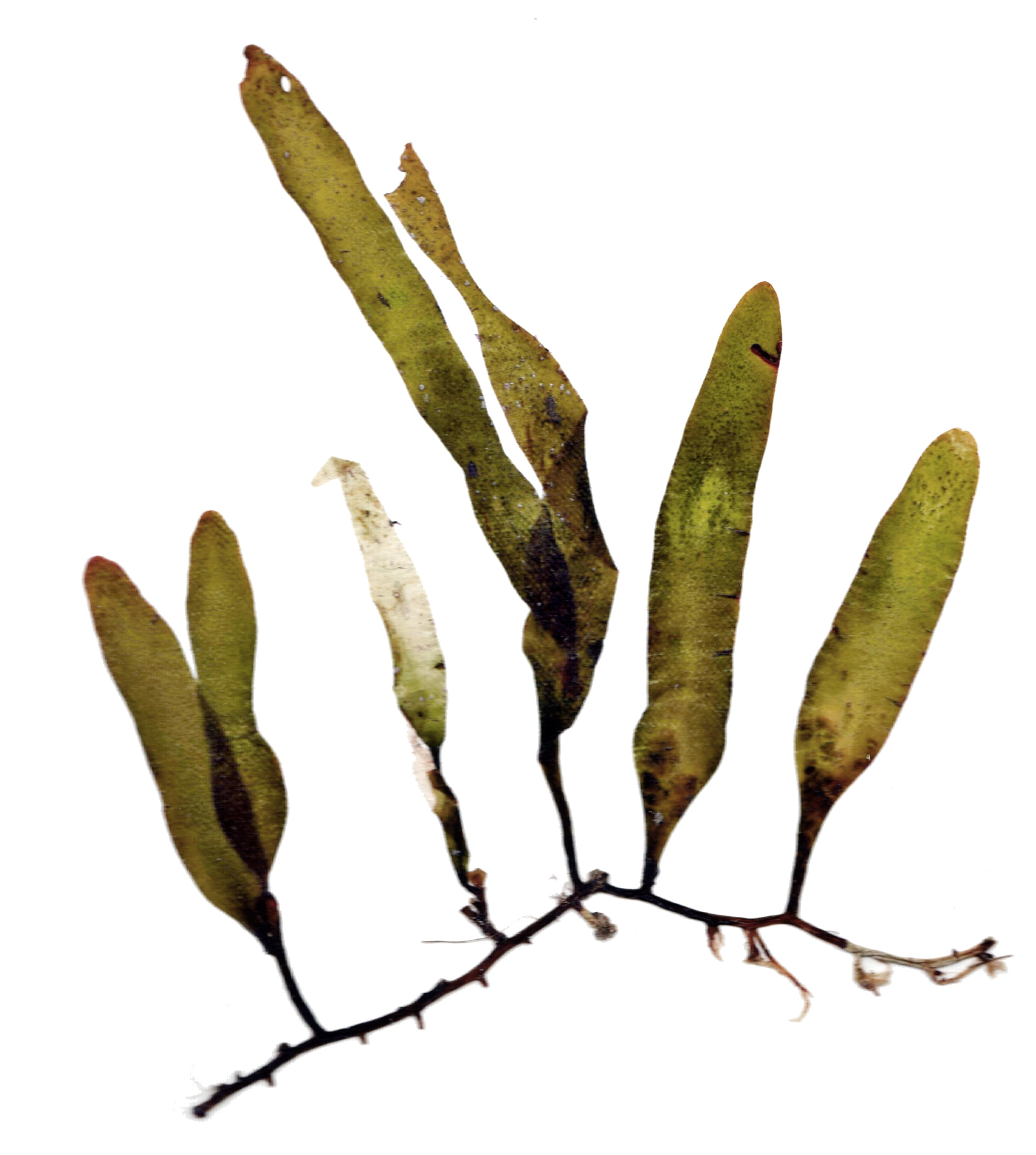
Caulerpa is a genus of edible seaweed.

	Species name
Aonori	Monostroma, Enteromorpha
Arame	Eisenia bicyclis
Carola	Callophyllis variegata
Dabberlocks (Badderlocks)	Alaria esculenta
Dulse (Dillisk)	Palmaria palmata
Eelgrass	Zostera
Green laver / Gim	Monostroma, Porphyra, Ulva
Gusô	Eucheuma spp.
Hijiki	Hizikia fusiformis
Kombu	Laminaria japonica
(Red) laver	Porphyra
Mozuku	Cladosiphon okamuranus
Nori	Porphyra, Pyropia
Ogonori	Gracilaria
Sea grape	Caulerpa lentillifera, Caulerpa racemosa
Sea lettuce	Ulva lactuca
Wakame	Undaria pinnatifida

== See also ==
- Herbs
- Vegetable juice
- List of culinary fruits
- List of leaf vegetables
- List of vegetable dishes
- List of foods
- Seed
