= Maxixe =

Maxixe can refer to

- Maroon cucumber, Portuguese name Maxixe
- Maxixe (dance), a Brazilian dance
- Maxixe, Mozambique, a city in Mozambique
- Maxixe (gemstone), a deep-blue variety of beryl
