= Wild gourd =

Wild gourd is a common name for several noncultivated plants in the family Cucurbitaceae and may refer to:

- Wild growing forms of plants called gourds, particularly
  - Citrullus colocynthis, thought to be the wild gourd mentioned in the Bible
  - Cucurbita foetidissima, native to the southwestern United States and Mexico
  - Cucumis prophetarum, found in the Middle East and north Africa
