= Xanthosoma eggersii =

Conservation status
- Endangered (IUCN 3.1)

Scientific classification
- Kingdom: Plantae
- Clade: Tracheophytes
- Clade: Angiosperms
- Clade: Monocots
- Order: Alismatales
- Family: Araceae
- Genus: Xanthosoma
- Species: X. eggersii

Binomial name
- Xanthosoma eggersii Engl.

Synonyms
- Caladium eggersii Engl.; Caladium riopalenquense Madison; Xanthosoma riopalenquense (Madison) Madison

Species of flowering plant

Xanthosoma eggersii is a species of plant in the family Araceae. It is endemic to Ecuador. Its natural habitat is subtropical or tropical moist lowland forests. It is threatened by habitat loss.
