= Xanthosoma paradoxum =

Scientific classification
- Kingdom: Plantae
- Clade: Tracheophytes
- Clade: Angiosperms
- Clade: Monocots
- Order: Alismatales
- Family: Araceae
- Genus: Xanthosoma
- Species: X. paradoxum

Binomial name
- Xanthosoma paradoxum Bogner (2005)

Species of flowering plant

Xanthosoma paradoxum is a species of flowering plant in the family Araceae indigenous to Colombia. Initially described as Caladium paradoxum, it was later transferred to the Xanthosoma genus due to its strong affinity with other Xanthosoma species.

This species is characterized by its disc-like, coherent styles with stigmas as broad as the ovary, pollen in monads, and entire leaf blades.

== Distribution and habitat ==
Xanthosoma paradoxum is endemic to Colombia and can be found in various regions, including Orinoquia and the Pacific. It grows primarily in the wet tropical biome and is found at elevations ranging from 100 to 1700 meters above sea level.

== Morphology and flowering ==
Xanthosoma paradoxum is a tuberous geophyte, which means it has an underground storage organ that helps it survive unfavourable conditions. The plant is an herb with entire leaf blades. Most Xanthosoma species flower contemporaneously with the leaves, but X. paradoxum flowers before the leaves appear, which is more common in the Caladium genus.

== Taxonomy and classification ==
Xanthosoma paradoxum was first described in Willdenowia in 2005 by German botanist, Josef Bogner.
