= Xanthosoma hylaeae =

Conservation status
- Least Concern (IUCN 3.1)

Scientific classification
- Kingdom: Plantae
- Clade: Embryophytes
- Clade: Tracheophytes
- Clade: Spermatophytes
- Clade: Angiosperms
- Clade: Monocots
- Order: Alismatales
- Family: Araceae
- Genus: Xanthosoma
- Species: X. hylaeae

Binomial name
- Xanthosoma hylaeae Engl. & K.Krause

Synonyms
- Xanthosoma purpuratum K.Krause

Species of flowering plant

Xanthosoma hylaeae is a species of flowering plant in the family Araceae, native to western South America and northern Brazil. A night-bloomer, it uses a variety of scents to attract its pollinators, scarab beetles in the tribe Cyclocephalini.
