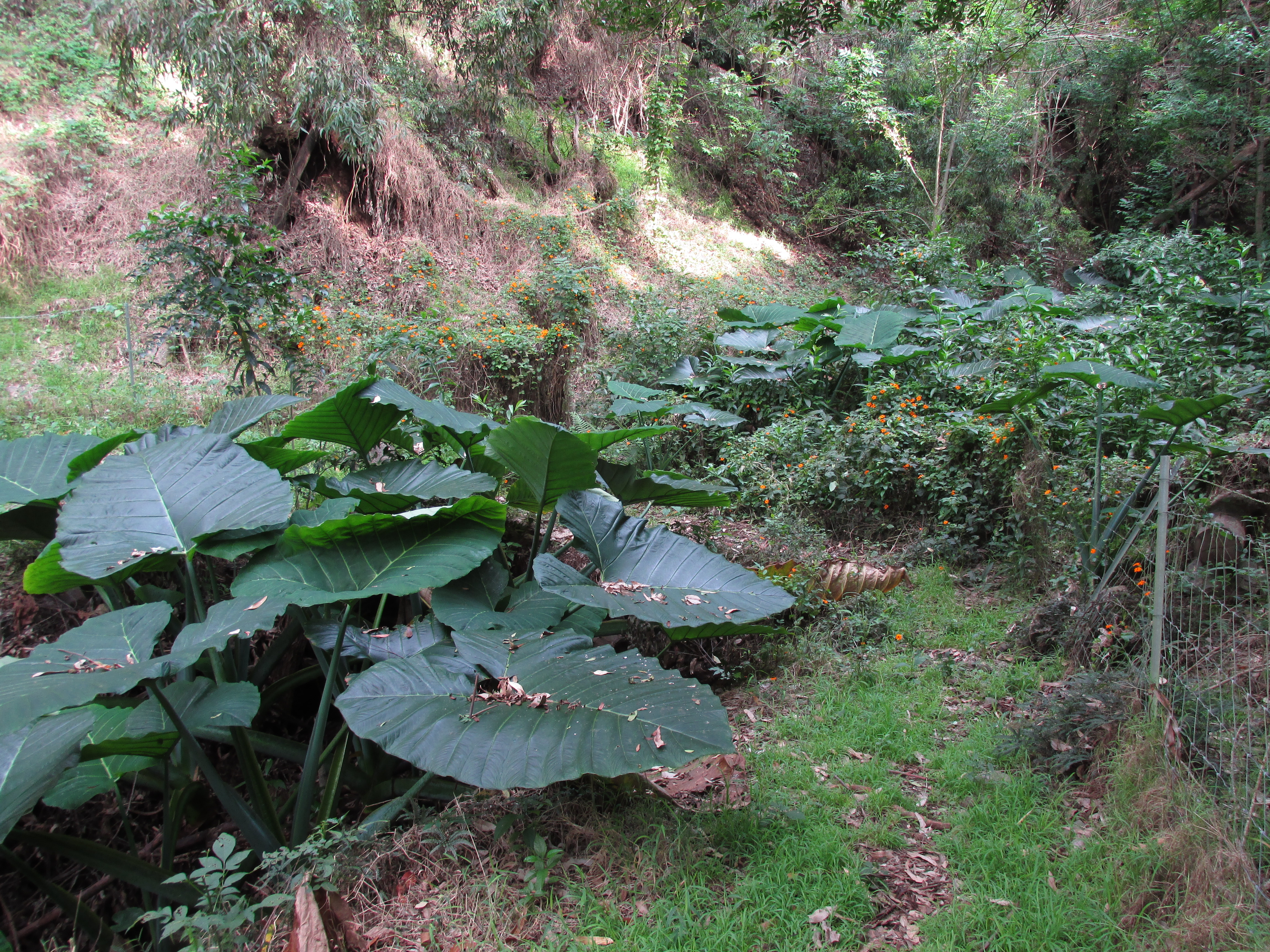

Scientific classification
- Kingdom: Plantae
- Clade: Tracheophytes
- Clade: Angiosperms
- Clade: Monocots
- Order: Alismatales
- Family: Araceae
- Genus: Xanthosoma
- Species: X. robustum

Binomial name
- Xanthosoma robustum Schott

= Xanthosoma robustum =

Species of plant

Xanthosoma robustum, also known as Elephant Ear, is a robust herbaceous plant native to Central Mexico and Central America that can grow up to 4 meters tall. It's an important plant with uses in medicine, environmental applications, and as a food source. This species has large, waxy, green leaves that can grow over a meter long. The plant also produces distinct inflorescences with a white to yellowish-green spathe and a pale yellow to ochre spadix.
