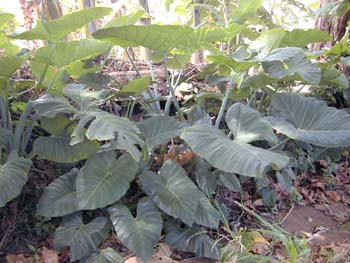
- Xanthosoma roseum 'Elephant Ear'

Scientific classification
- Kingdom: Plantae
- Clade: Tracheophytes
- Clade: Angiosperms
- Clade: Monocots
- Order: Alismatales
- Family: Araceae
- Subfamily: Aroideae
- Tribe: Caladieae
- Genus: Xanthosoma; Schott
- Range of the genus Xanthosoma

Synonyms
- Acontias Schott; Cyrtospadix K.Koch

= Xanthosoma =

Genus of plants

Xanthosoma is a genus of flowering plants in the arum family, Araceae. The genus is native to tropical America but widely cultivated and naturalized in other tropical regions. Several are grown for their starchy corms, an important food staple of tropical regions, known variously as malanga, otoy, otoe, cocoyam (or new cocoyam), tannia, tannier, yautía, macabo, ocumo, macal, taioba, dasheen, quequisque, ʻape and (in Papua New Guinea) as Singapore taro (taro kongkong). Many other species, including especially Xanthosoma roseum, are used as ornamental plants; in popular horticultural literature these species may be known as ‘ape due to resemblance to the true Polynesian ʻape, Alocasia macrorrhizos, or as elephant ear from visual resemblance of the leaf to an elephant's ear. Sometimes the latter name is also applied to members in the closely related genera Caladium, Colocasia (taro), and Alocasia.

The leaves of most Xanthosoma species are 40–200 centimetres (16–79 inches) long, sagittate (arrowhead-shaped) or subdivided into three or as many as 18 segments. Unlike the leaves of Colocasia, those of Xanthosoma are usually not peltate- the upper v-notch extends into the point of attachment of the leaf petiole to the blade.

== Reproduction ==
The inflorescence in Xanthosoma is composed of a spadix with pistillate flowers at the base, a belt of sterile flowers offered as a reward for pollinators in the middle and staminate flowers on the upper part. Prior to opening, the inflorescence is enclosed within a leaf-like spathe. When the inflorescence is ready to open, the upper part of the spathe opens and exposes the staminate area of the spadix; the basal area of the spathe remains closed, forming a spacious chamber (i.e., the spathe tube) that encloses the pistillate and sterile flowers (Garcia-Robledo et al. (2004, 2005a, 2005b)).

The inflorescences last for two nights and are protogynous in some, but not all species. They change from the pistillate phase that attracts pollinators on the night it opens, to a staminate phase on the second night, when pollen is shed. When the inflorescence opens, it produces heat and releases a sweet scent attracting its pollinators, dynastine beetles (Cyclocephala spp.). Dynastines arrive covered with pollen from another inflorescence and remain in the spathe tube for 24 hours, pollinating the pistillate flowers as they feed on the sterile area of the spadix. On the second night, they come out of the tube and walk over the staminate flowers, getting covered with pollen, and then flying to a recently opened inflorescence nearby. (Garcia-Robledo et al. (2004, 2005a, 2005b)). Fruit maturation takes several months. Fruits start to develop within the shelter of the spathe tube. When the infructescence is mature, in some species, it arches back and downwards. In other species, it stays erect. Then, the tissue of the spathe tube rolls outwards, exhibiting the bright orange fruits and the velvety pink inner spathe surface.

== Taxonomy ==
=== Species ===
The following species are accepted:

- Xanthosoma acutum E.G.Gonç. - French Guiana, Amapá State of Brazil
- Xanthosoma akkermansii (G.S.Bunting) Croat - Amazonas + Barinas States of Venezuela
- Xanthosoma aristeguietae (G.S.Bunting) Madison - Venezuela, northwestern Brazil
- Xanthosoma auriculatum Regel - northwestern Brazil
- Xanthosoma baguense Croat - northern Peru
- Xanthosoma bayo G.S.Bunting - Venezuela
- Xanthosoma belophyllum (Willd.) Kunth - Colombia, Venezuela, the Guianas; naturalized in Dominican Republic
- Xanthosoma bilineatum Rusby - Colombia
- Xanthosoma bolivaranum G.S.Bunting - Venezuela
- Xanthosoma brasiliense (Desf.) Engl. – Tahitian spinach - Lesser Antilles, Puerto Rico, Hispaniola, Trinidad & Tobago; naturalized in southern Brazil
- Xanthosoma brevispathaceum Engl. - Peru
- Xanthosoma caladioides Grayum - Panama
- Xanthosoma caracu K.Koch & C.D.Bouché – yautia horqueta - Puerto Rico, Dominican Republic
- Xanthosoma caulotuberculatum G.S.Bunting - Venezuela
- Xanthosoma conspurcatum Schott - Venezuela, Suriname, French Guiana
- Xanthosoma contractum G.S.Bunting - Bolívar State of Venezuela
- Xanthosoma cordatum N.E.Br. - Guyana, French Guiana
- Xanthosoma cordifolium N.E.Br. - Guyana
- Xanthosoma cubense (Schott) Schott - Cuba
- Xanthosoma daguense Engl. - Colombia, Ecuador
- Xanthosoma dealbatum Grayum - Costa Rica
- Xanthosoma eggersii Engl. - Ecuador
- Xanthosoma exiguum G.S.Bunting - Amazonas State of Venezuela
- Xanthosoma flavomaculatum Engl. - Colombia
- Xanthosoma fractum Madison - Peru
- Xanthosoma granvillei Croat & Thomps. - French Guiana
- Xanthosoma guttatum Croat & D.C.Bay - Valle del Cauca in Colombia
- Xanthosoma hebetatum Croat & D.C.Bay - Valle del Cauca in Colombia
- Xanthosoma helleborifolium (Jacq.) Schott – belembe silvestre - from Costa Rica south to central Brazil; naturalized in West Indies
- Xanthosoma herrerae Croat & P.Huang - Colombia
- Xanthosoma hylaeae Engl. & K.Krause - Colombia, Ecuador, Peru, Bolivia, northwestern Brazil
- Xanthosoma latestigmatum Bogner & E.G.Gonç. - Venezuela
- Xanthosoma longilobum G.S.Bunting - Venezuela
- Xanthosoma lucens E.G.Gonç - Rondônia
- Xanthosoma mafaffoides G.S.Bunting - Amazonas State of Venezuela
- Xanthosoma mariae Bogner & E.G.Gonç. - Peru
- Xanthosoma maroae G.S.Bunting - Amazonas State of Venezuela
- Xanthosoma maximiliani Schott - eastern Brazil
- Xanthosoma mendozae Matuda - México State in central México
- Xanthosoma mexicanum Liebm. - Chiapas, Oaxaca, Central America, Colombia, Venezuela
- Xanthosoma narinoense Bogner & L.P.Hannon - Colombia
- Xanthosoma nitidum G.S.Bunting - Venezuela
1. †Xanthosoma obtusilobum Engl. - Mexico, probably extinct
- Xanthosoma orinocense G.S.Bunting - Amazonas State of Venezuela
- Xanthosoma paradoxum (Bogner & Mayo) Bogner - Colombia
- Xanthosoma pariense G.S.Bunting - Venezuela
- Xanthosoma peltatum G.S.Bunting - Venezuela
- Xanthosoma pentaphyllum (Schott) Engl. - Brazil
- Xanthosoma platylobum (Schott) Engl. - Brazil
- Xanthosoma plowmanii Bogner - Brazil
- Xanthosoma poeppigii Schott - Peru, Bolivia, northwestern Argentina
- Xanthosoma pottii E.G.Gonç. - Mato Grosso do Sul
- Xanthosoma puberulum Croat - Bolivia
- Xanthosoma pubescens Poepp. - Ecuador, Peru, Bolivia, northwestern Brazil
- Xanthosoma pulchrum E.G.Gonç. - Mato Grosso
- Xanthosoma riedelianum (Schott) Schott - southeastern Brazil
- Xanthosoma riparium E.G.Gonç. - Goiás
- Xanthosoma robustum Schott – capote - Mexico, Central America; naturalized in Hawaii
- Xanthosoma sagittifolium (L.) Schott (Syn. Xanthosoma atrovirens K.Koch & C.D.Bouché, Xanthosoma violaceum Schott)- arrowleaf elephant ear, tiquizque, macal, nampi, malanga or American taro - Costa Rica, Panama, Venezuela, Colombia, Ecuador, Peru, Bolivia, Brazil; naturalized in West Indies, Africa, Bangladesh, Borneo, Malaysia, Christmas Island, Norfolk Island, some Pacific Islands, Alabama, Florida, Texas, Georgia, Oaxaca
- Xanthosoma saguasense G.S.Bunting - Venezuela
- Xanthosoma seideliae Croat - Bolivia
- Xanthosoma stenospathum Madison - Peru
- Xanthosoma striatipes (K.Koch & C.D.Bouché) Madison - Brazil, the Guianas, Venezuela, Colombia, Bolivia, Paraguay
- Xanthosoma striolatum Mart. ex Schott - French Guiana, northern Brazil
- Xanthosoma syngoniifolium Rusby - Bolivia, Argentina, Brazil
- Xanthosoma taioba E.G.Gonç. - Paraíba
- Xanthosoma tarapotense Engl. - Peru
- Xanthosoma trichophyllum K.Krause - Peru, Ecuador
- Xanthosoma trilobum G.S.Bunting - Amazonas State of Venezuela
- Xanthosoma ulei Engl. - northwestern Brazil
- Xanthosoma undipes (K.Koch) K.Koch – tall elephant's ear - widespread from Bolivia north to southern Mexico and West Indies
1. Xanthosoma viviparum Madison - Peru, Ecuador
- Xanthosoma weeksii Madison - Ecuador
- Xanthosoma wendlandii (Schott) Schott (syn. Xanthosoma hoffmannii Schott, Xanthosoma pedatum Hemsl.) Oaxaca, Central America, Venezuela
- Xanthosoma yucatanense Engl. - Yucatán, Quintana Roo

==== Deprecated ====
- Phyllotaenium lindenii André (as X. lindenii (André) Engl.)

=== Etymology ===
The name is derived from the Greek words ξανθός (xanthos), meaning 'yellow', and σῶμα (soma), meaning 'body'. It refers to the stigma or yellow inner tissues.

== Uses ==
Top Yautía (Cocoyam) Producers (in metric tons)
Rank	Country	2012	2013	2014
1	Cuba	153782	185922	269590
2	Venezuela	75132	84516	85607
3	El Salvador	43000	43000	41110
4	Peru	29200	30000	30960
5	Costa Rica	11692	23742	30000
6	Dominican Republic	32595	29104	28180
—	World	378952	423415	508079

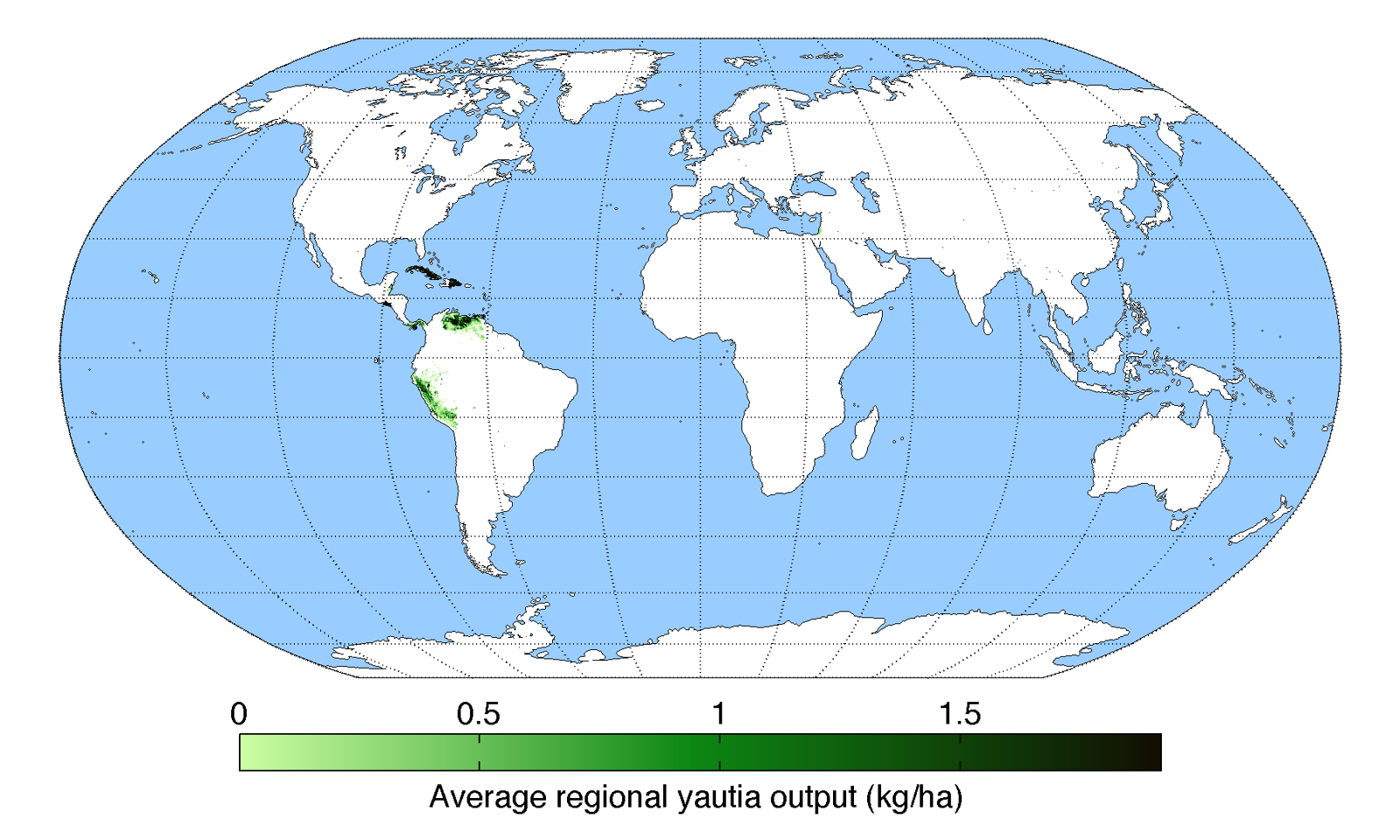
Worldwide yautía yield

Domestication of Xanthosoma species (especially X. sagittifolium but also X. atrovirens, X. violaceum, X. maffaffa and others) is thought to have originated in northern lowland South America, then spread to the Antilles and Mesoamerica. Today, Xanthosoma is still grown in all those regions, but is especially popular in Cuba, the Dominican Republic and Puerto Rico, where it is used in alcapurrias or boiled. It is grown in Trinidad and Tobago, Guyana and Jamaica to make the popular callaloo dish, and in St. Kitts and Nevis to make tannia fritters.

It is also grown in West Africa, now a major producer, where it can be used as a replacement for yams in a popular regional dish called fufu.

Xanthosoma is also grown as a crop in the Philippines.

Traditionally, Xanthosoma has been a subsistence crop with excess sold at local markets, but in the United States, large numbers of Latin American immigrants have created a market for commercial production. In general, production has yet to meet demand in some areas. In Polynesia, Alocasia macrorrhizos (‘ape) was considered a famine food, used only in the event of failure of the much preferred taro (kalo) crop. After having been introduced to Hawaii in the 1920s from South America, Xanthosoma has naturalized and has become more common than A. macrorrhizos, and has been given the same name, ʻape.

The typical Xanthosoma plant has a growing cycle of 9 to 11 months, during which time it produces a large stem called a corm, this surrounded by smaller edible cormels about the size of potatoes. These cormels (like the corm) are rich in starch. Their taste has been described as earthy and nutty, and they are a common ingredient in soups and stews. They may also be eaten grilled, fried, or puréed. The young, unfurled leaves of some varieties can be eaten as boiled leafy vegetables or used in soups and stews, such as the Caribbean callaloo.

Flour made from Xanthosoma species is hypoallergenic.

== Gallery ==
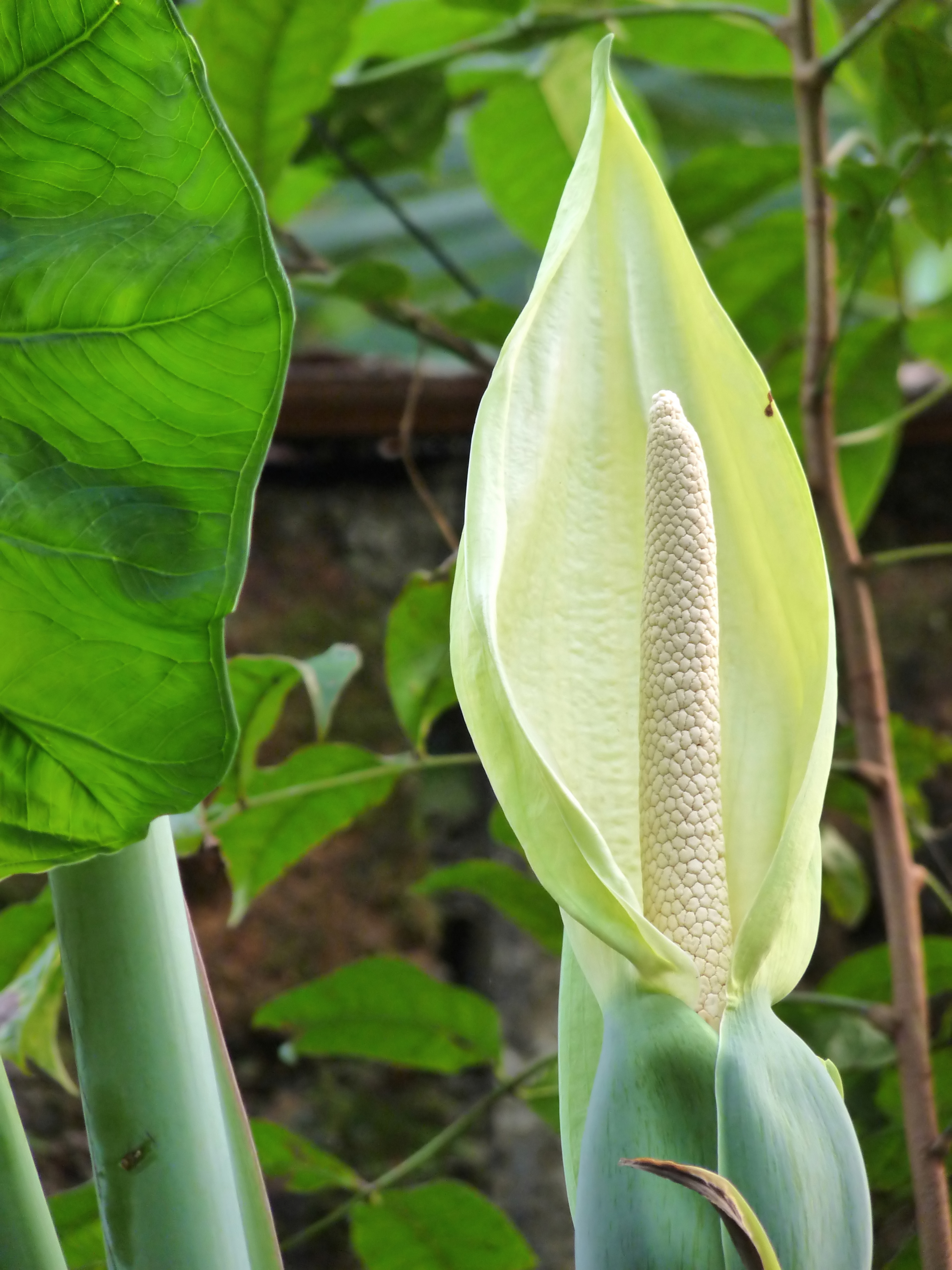
Inflorescence of Xanthosoma sagittifolium

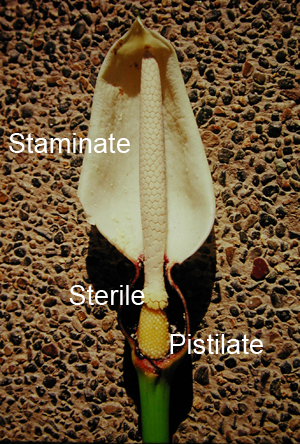
Inflorescence of X. daguense

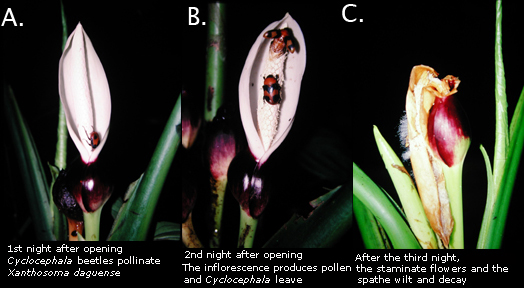
Beetle pollination in X. daguense

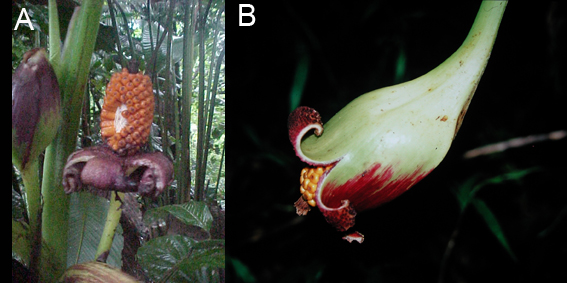
Infructescence of X. poeppigii (Peruvian Amazonas); X. daguense (Western Cordillera of Los Andes, Colombia)
