= Stocksia (plant) =

Scientific classification
- Kingdom: Plantae
- Clade: Tracheophytes
- Clade: Angiosperms
- Clade: Eudicots
- Clade: Rosids
- Order: Sapindales
- Family: Sapindaceae
- Genus: Stocksia; Benth.

Species of flowering plant

Stocksia is a monotypic genus of flowering plants belonging to the family Sapindaceae. It only contains one known species, Stocksia brahuica Benth.

It is native to Iran, Afghanistan and Pakistan.

The genus name of Stocksia is in honour of John Ellerton Stocks (1822–1854), an Englishman who became a botanist in India. The Latin specific epithet of brahuica refers to the Brahui people, an ethnic group native to the Balochistan region of Pakistan, where the plant was found. Both the genus and the species were first described and published in Hooker's J. Bot. Kew Gard. Misc. Vol.5 on pages 304-305 in 1853.
