= Xanthosoma caracu =

Scientific classification
- Kingdom: Plantae
- Clade: Tracheophytes
- Clade: Angiosperms
- Clade: Monocots
- Order: Alismatales
- Family: Araceae
- Genus: Xanthosoma
- Species: X. caracu

Binomial name
- Xanthosoma caracu K.Koch & C.D.Bouché

Species of flowering plant

Xanthosoma caracu (yautia horqueta) is a species of edible plant in the family Araceae. It was first formally described by Karl Koch and Carl David Bouché. It is native to South America and cultivated in Puerto Rico.

== Description ==
Xanthosoma caracu grows to between 1.5 metres (5 feet) to 1.8 m (6 ft) in height. The leaves are bluish-green and glossy on top and pale underneath, growing up to 0.61 m (2 ft) long and 38 centimetres (15 inches) wide.

== Toxicity ==
The entire plant contains a toxin which requires it to be cooked before it can be safely eaten.

== Uses ==
The corms and leaves are edible and are cultivated for food in Mexico, the Caribbean (including Puerto Rico) and northern South America. The corms are high in starch.
