= John Ellerton Stocks =

English botanist

John Ellerton Stocks M.D., F.L.S (1822–1854) was a native of Cottingham, East Riding of Yorkshire, England, who distinguished himself as a botanist in India. The standard author abbreviation Stocks is used to indicate this person as the author when citing a botanical name.

== India ==
He joined the Bombay Medical Staff in the 1840s. For most part of his service, he was posted in Sind.

=== Sind ===
While in Sindh he served as a vaccinator and inspector of drugs.

In 1853, botanist George Bentham published Stocksia, which is a genus of flowering plants from Iran, Afghanistan and Pakistan belonging to the family Sapindaceae and named after John Ellerton Stocks.
