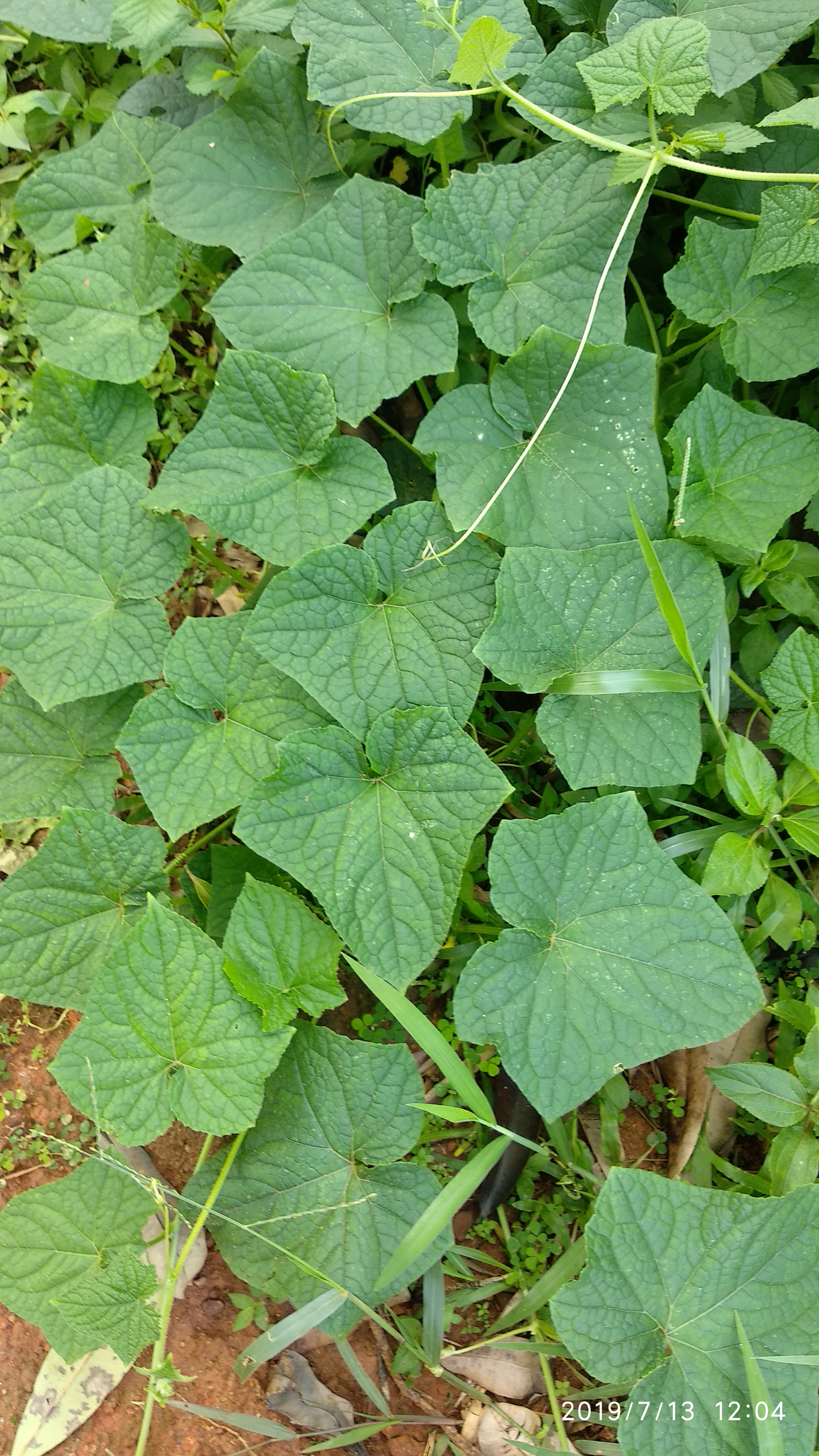
- Leaves of Cucumis prophetarum

Scientific classification
- Kingdom: Plantae
- Clade: Tracheophytes
- Clade: Angiosperms
- Clade: Eudicots
- Clade: Rosids
- Order: Cucurbitales
- Family: Cucurbitaceae
- Genus: Cucumis
- Species: C. prophetarum

Binomial name
- Cucumis prophetarum L. (1759)

Subspecies
- Cucumis prophetarum subsp. dissectus (Naud.) Jeffrey; Cucumis prophetarum subsp. prophetarum

Synonyms
- Cucumis amarus Stocks ex Naudin; Cucumis anguinus Anderson; Cucumis arabicus Delile; (Cucumis prophetarum subsp. dissectus): Cucumis chrysocomus var. echinophorus (Naud.) Hiern; Cucumis ficifolius var. dissectus (Naudin) Cogn.; Cucumis figarei var. dissectus Naudin; Cucumis figarei var. echinophorus Naud.; Cucumis fissifolius var. dissectus (Naud.) Cogn.; Cucumis halabarda Chiov.; Cucumis lyratus Zimmermann; Cucumis nigristriatus Zimmermann; Cucumis pustulatus var. echinophorus A.Terr.; (Cucumis prophetarum subsp. prophetarum): Cucumis amarus Stocks; Cucumis amarus Stocks ex T.Anders.; Cucumis anguria Forssk.; Cucumis arabicus Del. ex Naud.; Cucumis foetidus Salisb.; Cucumis mascatensis Gand.; Cucumis pustulatus subsp. echinophorus A.Terracc.

= Cucumis prophetarum =

Species of vine

Cucumis prophetarum is a dioecious and prostrate or climbing perennial vine in the family Cucurbitaceae. The specific epithet (prophetarum) comes from Latin propheta, meaning "prophet".

== Distribution ==
Cucumis prophetarum is native to Africa and the Middle East, from Mauritania east to the Horn of Africa and southwest to Angola then southeast to South Africa, as well as Israel south to Yemen and Oman and east to northwestern India. It has been introduced to Qatar. It grows wild in semi-desert bushland and grassland up to 6,594 feet (2,010 meters) in elevation, often with acacia trees.

== Description ==
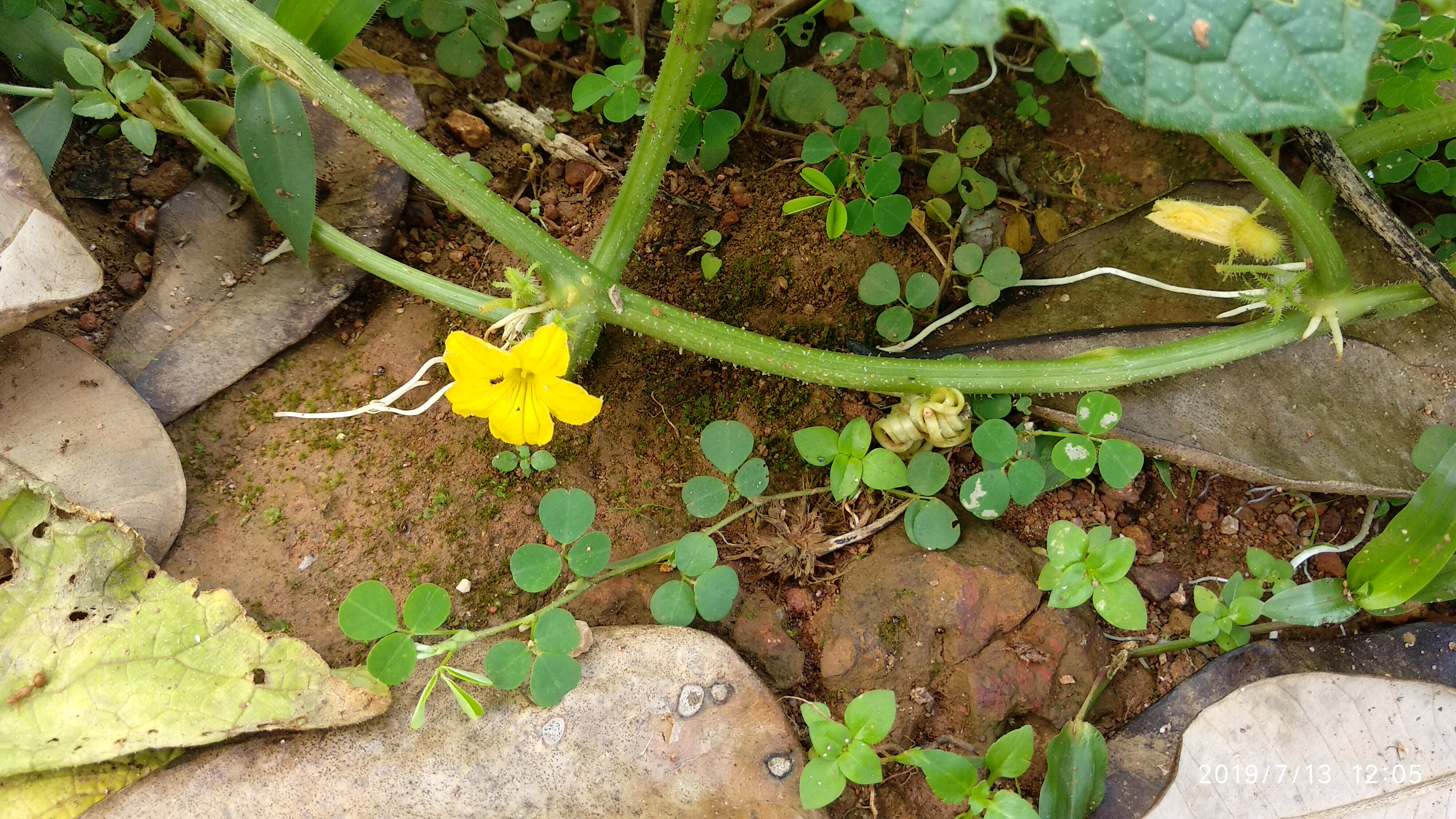
Flower of Cucumis prophetarum

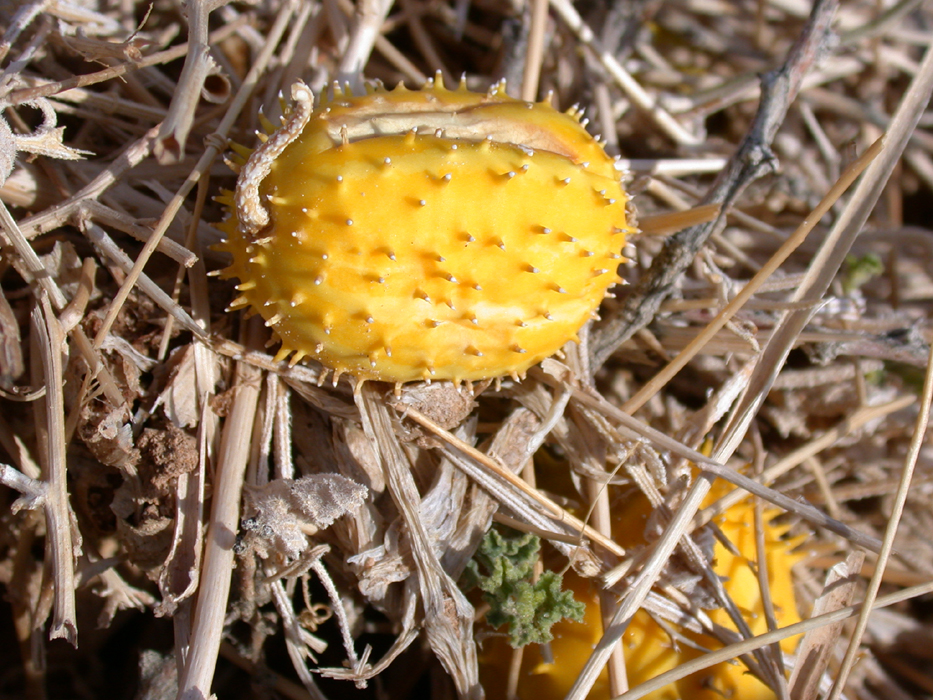
Fruit of Cucumis prophetarum

Its stems and leaves are hairy and the leaves are ovate to round in shape and cordate at the base and measure 2–4 centimeters in length. The margins are dentate or lobulate. They have 3–5 blunt-toothed, obtuse or subacute lobes, and the petioles measure 6–87 millimeters (0.24–3.43 inches) in length. Male flowers occur in clusters of 2–3 on pedicels measuring 3–25 millimeters (0.12–0.98 inches) in length, and are rarely solitary. Female flowers are always solitary and have peduncles measuring 6–30 millimeters (0.24–1.18 inches) in length. They have five yellow petals measuring 5–8 millimeters in length and 2.5–3.5 millimeters in width. The fruit is slightly ovoid and is vertically striped and yellow in color when ripe. It measures 3–4 centimeters in length and is covered in spike-like pustules.

== Uses ==
The fruit has a bitter flavor when raw and is sometimes boiled or pickled and the leaves are cooked and served with a staple. The fruit is eaten across its native range and occasionally cultivated and sold in local markets.

The fruit is also used in folk medicine in Saudi Arabia to treat liver disorders.

== See also ==
- List of culinary fruits
- List of culinary vegetables
