= Xanthosoma brasiliense =

Scientific classification
- Kingdom: Plantae
- Clade: Tracheophytes
- Clade: Angiosperms
- Clade: Monocots
- Order: Alismatales
- Family: Araceae
- Genus: Xanthosoma
- Species: X. brasiliense

Binomial name
- Xanthosoma brasiliense (Desf.) Engl.

Species of flowering plant

Xanthosoma brasiliense is a species of flowering plant in the Araceae. Common names include Tahitian spinach, tannier spinach, belembe, and Tahitian taro. It is one of several leaf vegetables used to make callaloo, and it may be called calalu in Puerto Rico.

This plant is a perennial herb with large leaf blades borne on long petioles up to 60 centimeters (nearly 2 feet). The plant can reach one meter (3.28 feet) in height.

This plant was domesticated in the Amazon and it is now grown throughout tropical regions of the world. The leaves and stems are cooked and eaten as vegetables. It is cooked to remove calcium oxalate crystals, which are present in the leaves of aroids. Unlike some other tannia (Xanthosoma spp.), the corms are not used for food because they are small and underdeveloped.
