= Potato onion =

Varieties of onion

- Species: Allium cepa
- Cultivar group: Aggregatum Group

The potato onion (also known as an Egyptian onion, underground onion or multiplier onion) is a group of varieties which has been classed in the Aggregatum Group of Allium cepa, similar to the shallot, though Maud Grieve calls it Allium ×proliferum.

It sometimes produces irregular-shaped or round bulbs, which in some old English varieties may be large, although others may be less so. According the French ethnobotanist Michel Chauvet, the potato onion, also called family onion, forms several more or less flattened bulbs which, unlike shallots, remain enveloped in external tunics. The term aggregatum was coined to describe this type. It is cultivated in the gardens of many countries, including Finland, Russia, Sri Lanka, Philippines, and Ecuador.

It is planted from bulbs, not from seed. It should be planted in the fall to early spring. Sources differ about planting depth, some saying shallow planting is appropriate and others calling for deeper planting.
