= List of cucumber varieties =

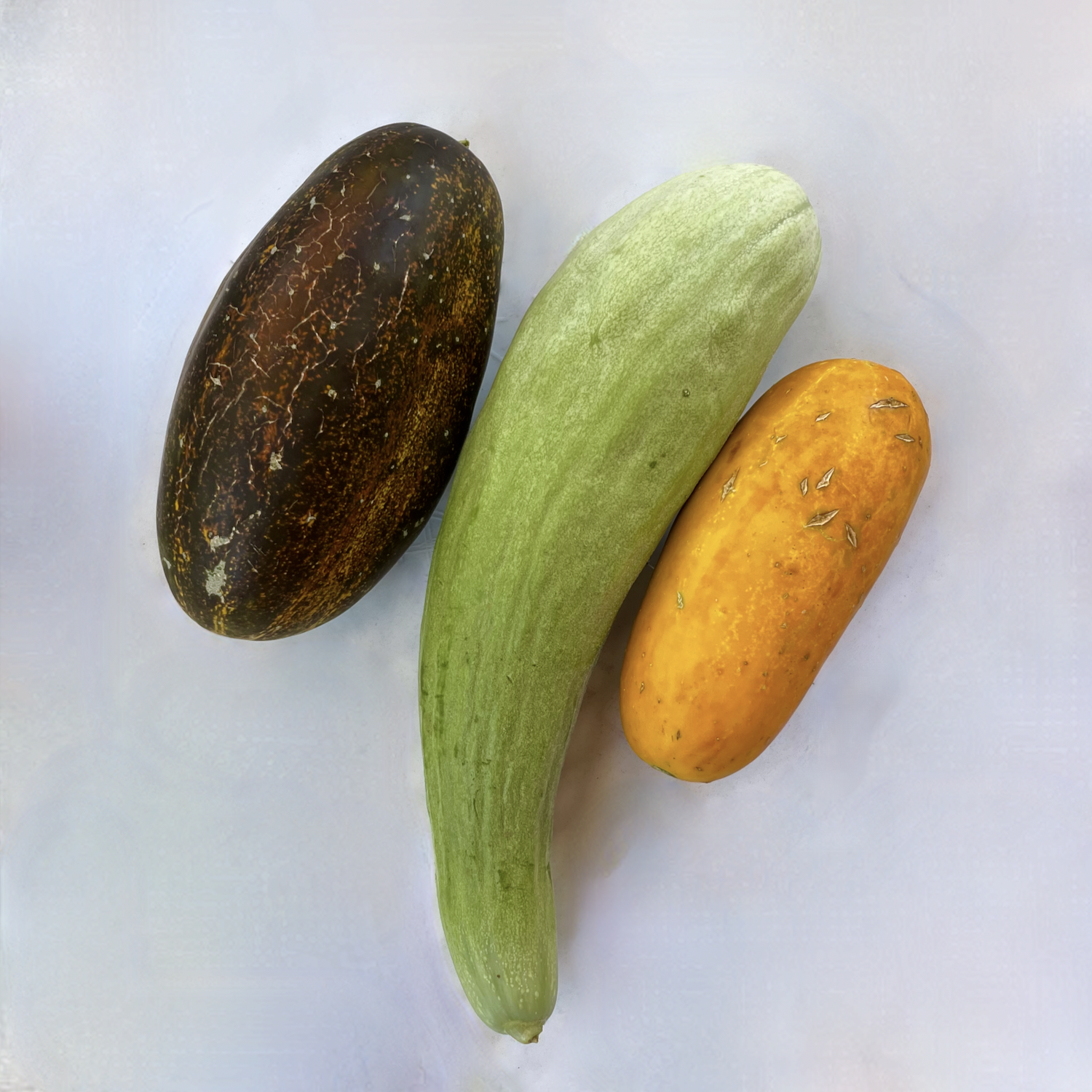
Three kinds of cucumbers: Sikkim, Armenian, and lemon

This is a list of varieties or cultivars of cucumber, a widely cultivated vine in the gourd family, Cucurbitaceae. The cucumber vine bears edible fruit.

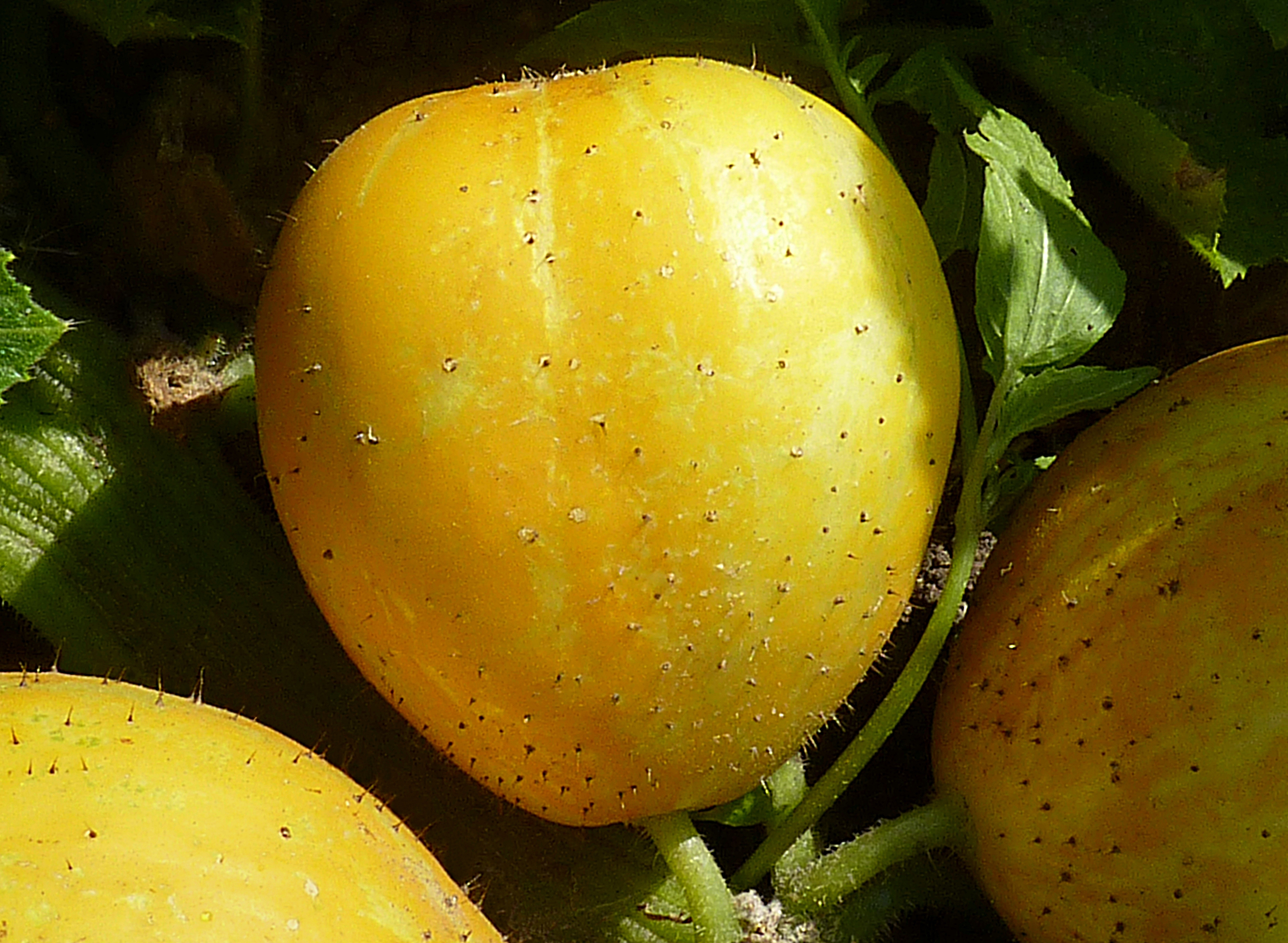
A lemon cucumber

== Varieties ==
- Aonaga Jibai
- Arola
- Babylon
- Beit Alpha
- Bella
- Brown Russian
- Burpless 26
- Burpless Tasty Green
- Bush Crop
- Camaro (European)
- Carmen
- China Jade
- Cobra
- Cool Breeze (India)
- Corinto
- Cortez
- Crystal Apple
- Cucino
- Cutter
- Darlington
- Dasher II
- Daytona
- Delizia
- Diamante
- Diomede
- Diva
- Dominator
- Dosakai
- European cucumber
- Exocet
- Fatum
- Fanfare
- Fountain
- Garden Sweet Burpless
- General Lee
- Genuine
- Gherkin
- Grantchester
- Green Finger
- Green Slam
- Greensleeves
- H-19 Little Leaf
- Harmonie
- Helena
- HMX 8416
- Huddersfield Tom
- Impact
- Indio
- Indy
- Intimidator
- Jawell (mini)
- Jogger
- Katrina
- Kirby
- Laura
- Lebanese
- Lemon
- Lightening
- Lider
- Lucky Dance
- Marketmore 76
- Marketmore 97
- Masterpiece
- Munchmore
- Niagara
- Northern Pickling
- Olympian
- Orient Express
- Panther
- Persian
- Persika
- Picolino
- Poinsett
- Poinsett 76
- Pot Luck
- PS14710903
- Raider
- Rockingham
- Rocky
- Saber
- Salad Bush
- Salt and Pepper
- Saskatoon Slim
- Shantung Suhyo Cross
- Sikkim
- Slicemaster Select
- Soarer
- Socrates
- Spacemaster
- Speedway
- Sprint 440
- SR2389CW
- SRQ2387
- SRQ2389
- Stonewall
- Straight Eight Elite
- Strong 'n' Long
- Sultan
- Summer Dance
- Summer Top
- Suyo Long
- Sweet Slice
- Sweet Success
- Sweeter Yet
- Swing
- Talladega
- Tanja
- Tasty Green
- Tasty Jade
- Taurus
- Telegraph
- Thunder
- Thunderbird
- Tiffany
- Triumph
- Turbo
- Tyria
- Vega
- Verde Xtra
- Viper
- White Revolver
- Yaniv
- Zeina
- Zipangu
