= Tzatziki =

Cold cucumber–yogurt dip, soup, or sauce

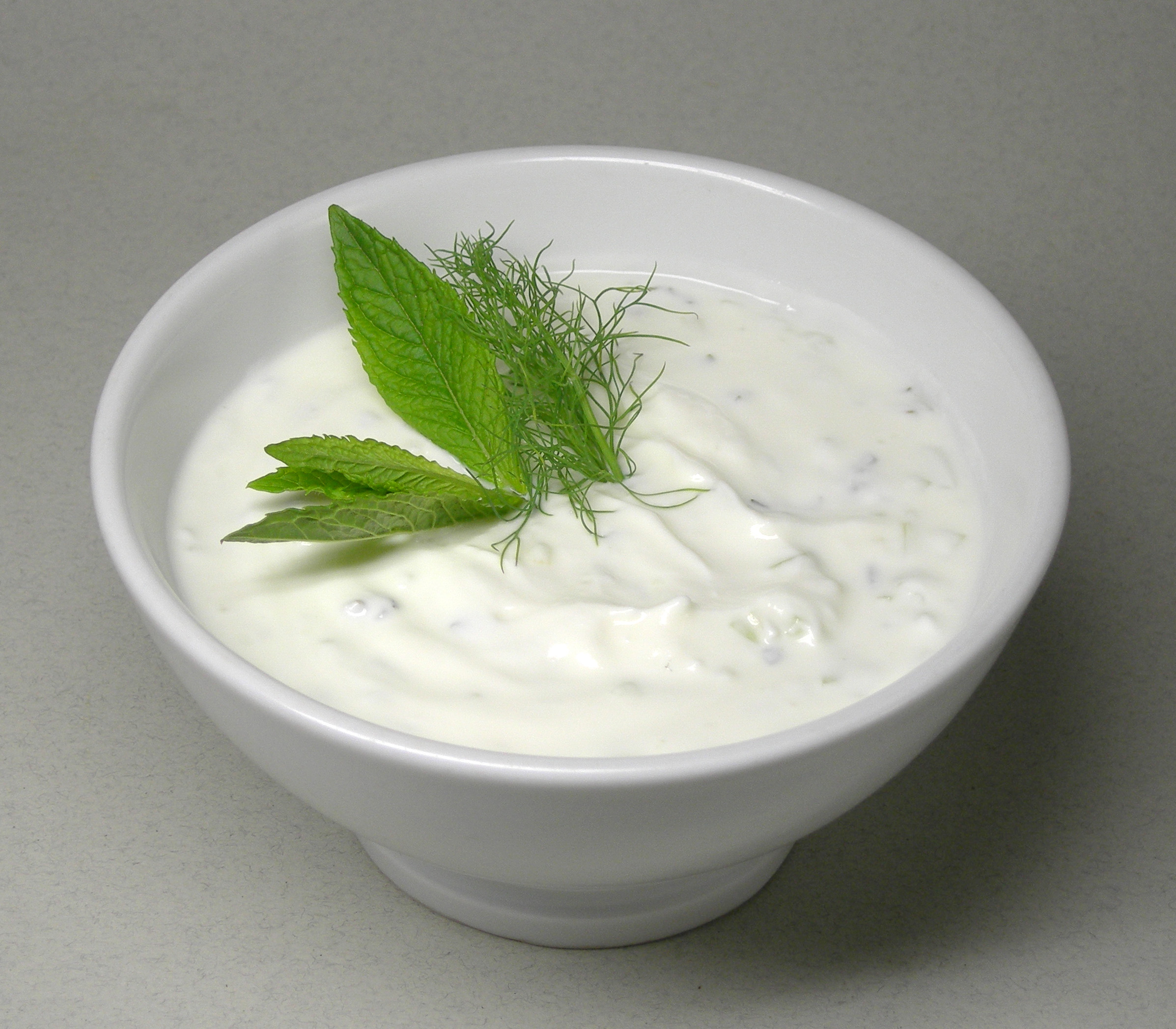
- A bowl of Turkish cacık
- Alternative names: Cacık, tarator
- Type: Dip or soup
- Course: Appetiser, side dish, meze
- Place of origin: Middle East
- Serving temperature: Cold
- Main ingredients: Strained yogurt, cucumbers, garlic, olive oil, red wine vinegar, salt
- Ingredients generally used: Lemon juice, dill, mint, parsley, thyme, walnut
- Variations: Diluted yogurt, other herbs and vegetables

Tzatziki (/zɑːdˈziːki/; Greek: τζατζίκι [d͡zaˈd͡zici]), also known as cacık (Turkish: [dʒaˈdʒɯk]) or tarator, is a class of dip, soup, or sauce found in the cuisines of Southeastern Europe and West Asia. It is made of salted strained yogurt or diluted yogurt mixed with cucumbers, garlic, salt, olive oil, red wine vinegar, sometimes with lemon juice, and herbs such as dill, mint, parsley and thyme. It is served as a cold appetiser (meze), a side dish, and as a sauce for souvlaki and gyros sandwiches and other foods.

== Etymology ==
The word tzatziki appeared in English around the mid-20th century as a loanword from Modern Greek (τζατζίκι), which in turn comes from the Turkish word cacık. The root is likely related to several words in West Asian languages. Persian zhazh (ژاژ) refers to various herbs used for cooking, and Kurdish jaj or ژاژ refers to the caraway herb. (Note: Persian zhazh (ژاژ) is the earlier attested form because Dehkhoda explicitly traces it to Asadi Tusi's Loġat-e fors and Asadī was an 11th-century lexicographer, whereas Kurmanji Kurdish jaj is documented in modern dictionaries.) That word is combined with the Turkish diminutive suffix -cık to yield cacık. The Armenian word cacıg is also related to this term and may itself derive from Turkish or Kurdish.

Evliya Çelebi's 1665 travelogue, the Seyahatnâme, defined cacıχ (cacıg) as a kind of herb that is added to food. The modern term cacık (جاجیك) was mentioned in print for the first time in 1844 in Hoca Kâmil Pasha's Melceü't-Tabbâhîn (The Sanctuary of Cooks), the first Ottoman cookbook, in which the basic description is given as "yogurt with cucumber and garlic" (hıyar ve sarmısaklı yoğurt).

The form tarator, found in languages from the Balkans to the Levant with derivative forms now found in a range of countries.

According to Sevan Nişanyan, the name tarator (sauce) comes into Turkish directly from the Venetian word "trattor". In Venetian, this word means "cook". It has acquired the meaning of a type of sauce in Turkish. It has likely been borrowed from Turkish into other languages. The first use of this word in the sense of sauce was in Seyahatnâme.

== History ==
The earliest known recipe for tzatziki dates back to the medieval period, first appearing in the 10th century as jājaq (Arabic: جاجق) in the Abbasid-era Baghdadi cookbook Kitab al-Tabikh (Arabic: كتاب الطبيخ, lit. 'The Book of Dishes'), compiled by Ibn Sayyār al-Warrāq. The recipe details the following preparation:

Take a clean leather container (ziqq) and scent it. Pour yogurt into it and add salt. The outside of the ziqq needs to be salted, too. Stir into the yogurt, chopped onion, whole skinned cloves of garlic, finely chopped parsley, na'na' (cultivated mint) tarragon, rue, khiyār (small, smooth cucumbers), and qiththā (ribbed, long cucumber), peeled lettuce stems, and—when in season—some artichoke (ḥarshaf). Use also fresh and tender [green] almonds. The best [vegetables and herbs] added to it are a suitable amount of na'na' (cultivated mint), rue, parsley, onion, and garlic. Besides, you need to keep [the leather container] clean all the time [to allow liquids to drain]. When it is ready to eat, serve it with olive oil.

According to the food historian Nawal Nasrallah, this recipe is the precursor to modern tzatziki, found throughout the Middle East and Greece. The British scholar and translator of Arabic literature, Daniel Newman, identifies jājaq as a Turkish dish, characterizing it as “a salad of chopped cucumber dressed with curds and garlic”, and notes its continuity in present-day Armenian jajik, Turkish cacık, and Greek tzatziki.

The anonymous 14th-century Mamluk-era Egyptian cookbook Kanz al-Fawa'id fi Tanwi' al-Mawa'id (Arabic: كنز الفوائد في تنويع الموائد, lit. 'Treasure Trove of Benefits and Variety at the Table') marks the earliest record of jājaq made with strained yogurt, alongside two alternative recipes featuring broadleaf and wild mustard greens. The recipe for the strained version is as follows:

Take common cucumbers (khiyār), peel them, and make two cross-like slits lengthwise [but not all the way through]. Sprinkle them with a bit of salt. Chop fresh fennel (shamār) and mint. Put laban Turkumānī (yogurt of sheep milk) in a sack, [and hang it to drain the whey] from early morning until noontime (ẓuhr). Now squeeze out the moisture from the cucumbers and put them in the [drained] yogurt; also add 1 dirham (1/2 teaspoon) crushed mastic gum; [add the chopped fresh fennel and mint as well]. Remove the leafy parts of the stalks of wild mustard greens (labsān). [Gather the stalks in bunches] and cut each bunch in half. Put the cut stalks in a quffa (large round basket made of date palm fronds), and rub them with salt very well, and take them out. Soak moldy bread ('afīn) in yogurt, thoroughly mash it, and then strain the mix through a sieve [to get rid of any lumps], [add this along with] the labsān stalks to [the drained yogurt]. Continue stirring the yogurt mix, once in the morning and once in the evening [for several consecutive days] until it [matures and] tastes good. [When you serve it,] drizzle it with sweet olive oil. It is delicious.

During the Ottoman Empire, yogurt-based condiments were integral to Ottoman cuisine and the meze tradition, including tzatziki, which, according to the food writer Marianna Yerasimos, reflect earlier Central Asian origins. Another notable example was tarator, prepared with yogurt, cucumber, garlic, or sometimes walnuts. Seyahatnâme describes dishes made with yogurt and garlic, demonstrating their established place in Ottoman cuisine.

In the Balkans and the Levant, variations of tarator developed with different bases: in the Levant it is usually made with tahini, while in the Balkans it may include yogurt and walnuts. In Anatolia, however, the version made with yogurt, cucumber, garlic, and sometimes walnuts became known as cacık.

Today, cacık is widely consumed in Turkey as a refreshing dish, especially in summer, while related versions continue to exist in Balkan and Levantine cuisines.

== Variations ==
=== Arab world ===
In Iraq, jajeek is often served as meze. It may accompany alcoholic drinks, especially arak, an ouzo-like drink made from anise.

In some parts of the Arab world, it is known as سَلَطَة خِيار باللَّبَن, salaṭat ḵiyār bi-l-laban, made from yogurt and cucumbers.

=== Balkans ===
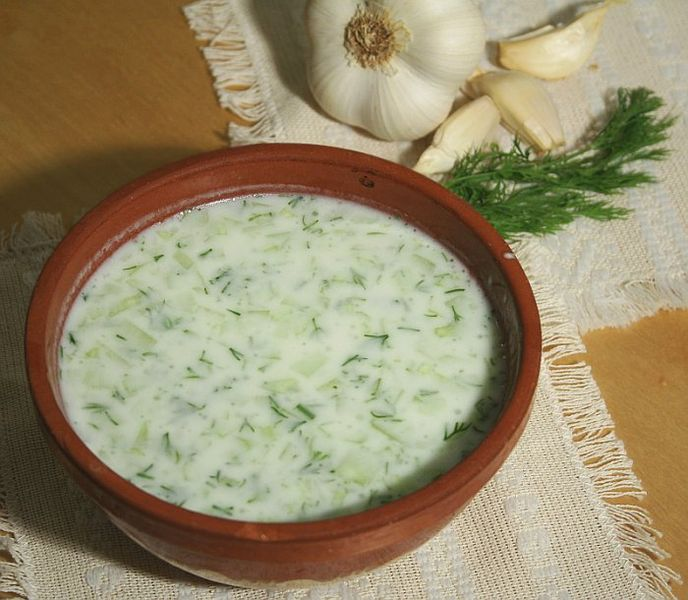
Bulgarian tarator served as soup

Tarator is found in many Balkan countries, often served as a soup or liquid salad, especially in summer. It is typically made with yogurt, cucumbers, garlic, oil, and salt, and commonly includes dill and walnuts; water may be added to thin it, and the dish is served chilled. In Bulgaria, tarator is a traditional cold soup and a popular summer dish. A thicker related preparation is Snezhanka, which is made with strained yogurt mixed with cucumber, garlic, dill, and oil, with walnuts sometimes added.

In Albania, tarator is likewise eaten as a cold summer dish made from yogurt, cucumber, garlic, and herbs, often with olive oil; the consistency may range from soup-like to dip-like depending on the yogurt used and the amount of added water.

=== Cyprus ===
In Cyprus, the dish is known as ταλαττούρι ("talattouri") and is similar to the Greek recipe with a more characteristic flavour of mint and added acidity in the form of lemon juice.

It is made from strained yogurt, sliced cucumbers, minced garlic cloves, lemon juice and sprinkled with dried mint, oregano or olive oil.

=== Greece ===
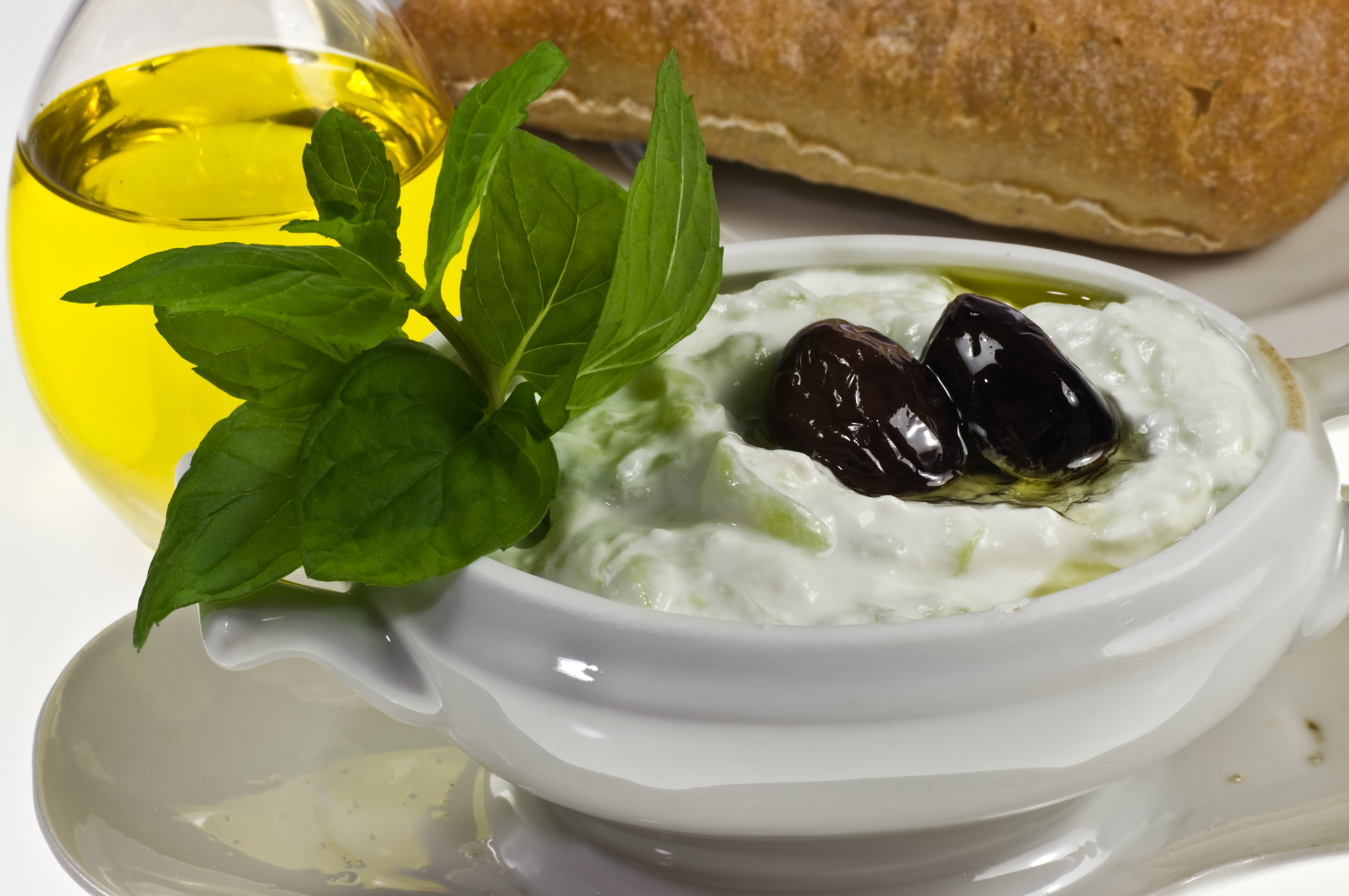
Tzatziki with olives and a spearmint garnish, served as meze

Greek-style tzatziki sauce is commonly served as a meze, to be eaten with pita bread, olives, fried eggplant, zucchini, or other vegetables. It is also used for dishes like gyros, or souvlaki and most other greek dishes.

Regular tzatziki is made of strained yogurt (usually from sheep or goat milk) mixed with cucumbers, garlic, salt, olive oil, vinegar, dill, mint, and parsley.

A variation made with purslane (glistrida in Greek) may be called glistrida me yiaourti, meaning 'purslane and yogurt salad', rather than tzatziki. One simple recipe calls for purslane, olive oil, red wine vinegar and dill. There also is a version where walnut oil, crushed nuts (like walnuts, hazelnuts, or almonds) and red peppers are added to the standard yoghurt base.

=== Iran ===
In Iran, it is known as mast o khiar.

=== Turkey ===
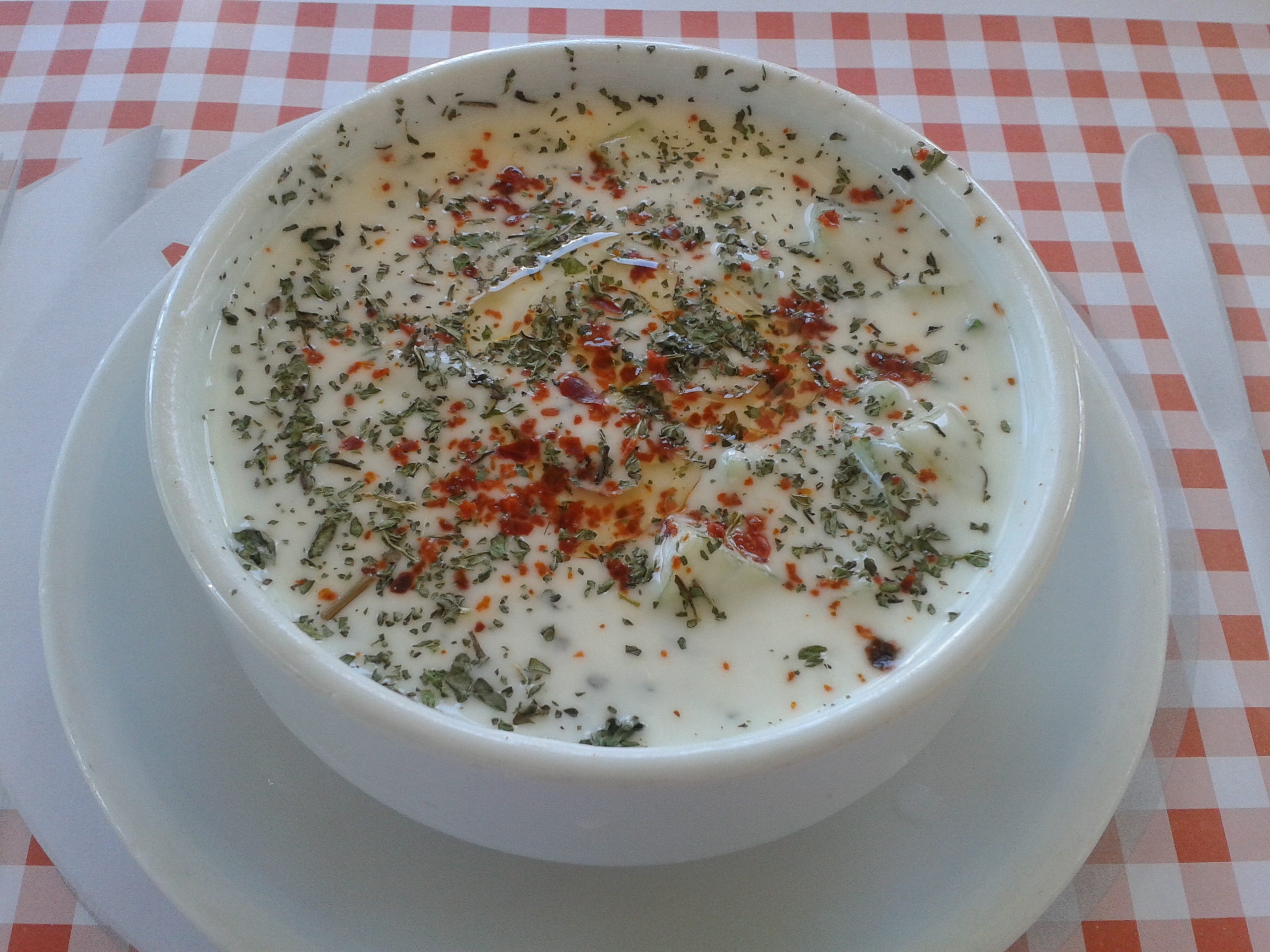
Turkish cacık seasoned with Aleppo pepper and mint

Turkish cacık is made by combining water and yogurt together with garlic and different combinations of vegetables and herbs. Labne may be substituted for some of the yogurt.

Turkish cacık also has many variations; different recipes use wheat berries, carrots, scallions, mint, radish, red pepper, parsley, dill, basil, chondrilla juncea, vinegar, walnuts, hazelnuts and unripe almonds. (Note: Cites multiple sources:)

For cacıklı arap köftesi, kofta made from a mix of bulgur and ground meat is served over cacık. In this case the cacık is made with chard rather than the usual cucumber (spinach or parsley may be substituted for the chard. Some recipes use purslane). Bulgurlu madımak cacığı is made with cracked wheat, cucumber and a species of knotweed called madımak (P.cognatum).

== Similar dishes ==
A similar dish in the Caucasus mountains, called ovdukh, uses kefir instead of the yogurt. This can be poured over a mixture of vegetables, eggs and ham to create a variation of okroshka, sometimes referred to as a "Caucasus okroshka".

Mizeria is a Polish dish of sliced cucumbers mixed with sour cream or another fermented milk product, often herbs (such as dill or chives) and seasonings, which is commonly served as a savoury or sweet side salad with typical dinner dishes.

In India, Pakistan, Bangladesh & South Asia, a similar dish is made with yogurt, grated or finely chopped cucumber, salt and condiments like ground cumin (sometimes also including onions) called "raita". However it does not contain garlic. It's served as a side with Biryani or other meals.

In Iran, ash-e doogh is another type of yogurt soup; instead of cucumbers it contains a variety of herbs such as basil, leek, mint, black pepper and raisins. In this style, sometimes dried bread chips, chopped nuts or raisins are put in the dish just before serving.

== See also ==
- Cold borscht
- List of dairy products
- List of dips
- List of hors d'oeuvre
- List of yogurt-based dishes and beverages
