= Cucumber soup =

Traditional Polish and Lithuanian soup made from sour, salted cucumbers and potato

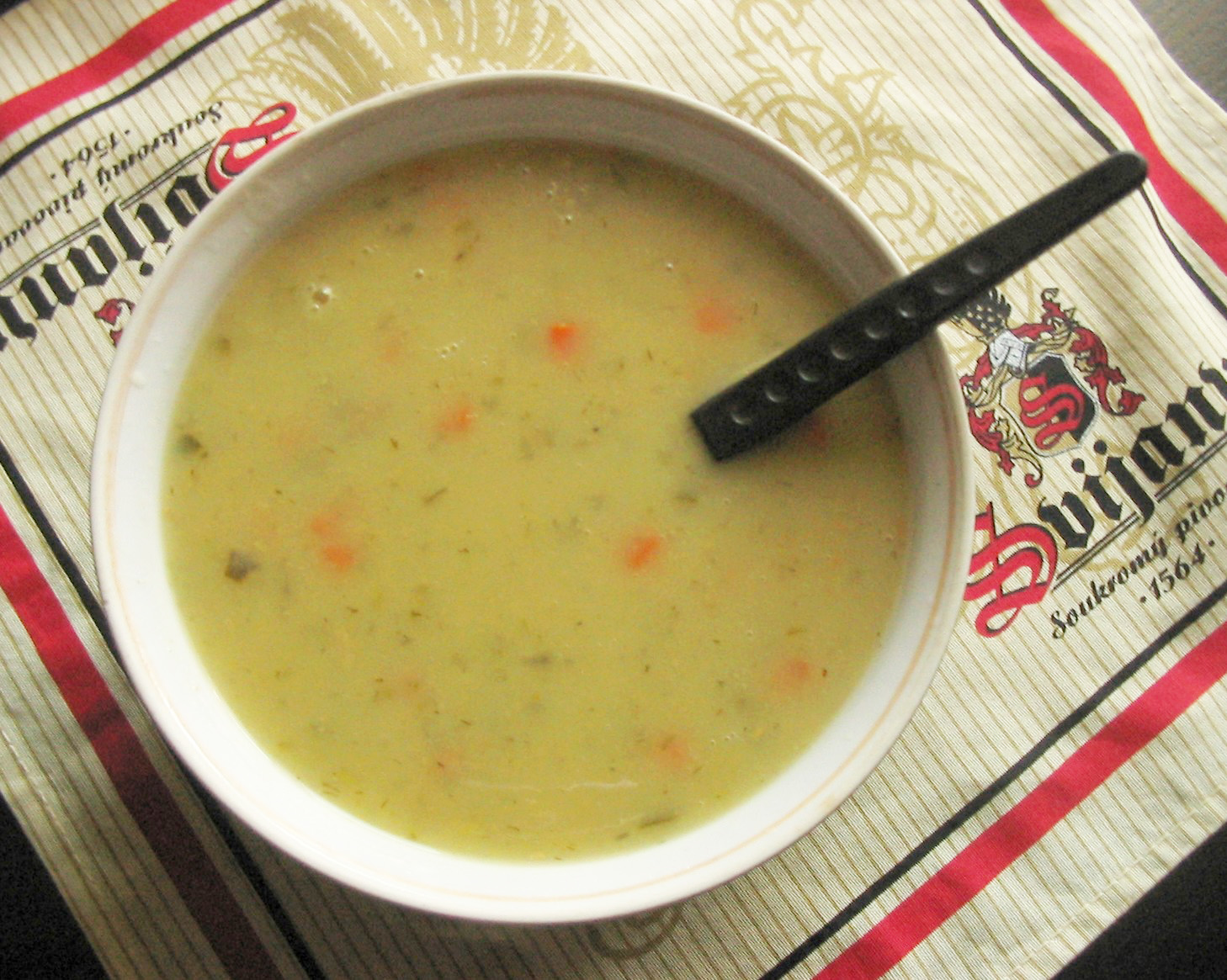
- Zupa ogórkowa is prepared using sour, salted cucumbers
- Alternative names: Ogórkowa
- Course: Soup, entree
- Place of origin: Poland
- Region or state: Central Europe
- Serving temperature: Hot or cold
- Main ingredients: Cucumber, pickled cucumber

Cucumber soup is a traditional Polish and Lithuanian soup (Polish: Zupa ogórkowa, ['zupa ɔ'gurkɔva]). It is made from sour, salted cucumbers and potato. Occasionally, rice is substituted for the potatoes.

Cucumber soup is also any soup using cucumbers as a primary ingredient, and is present in various cuisines. The two major varieties are fresh cucumber soup and pickled cucumber soup.

A similar soup is also common in Russia and Ukraine, where it is known as rassolnik. There is another cucumber based soup known as tarator in Bulgaria, which is served cold.

== Fresh cucumber soups ==
Some fresh cucumber soups are just a blend of ingredients (cucumber, spices, other vegetables or fruits, etc.) served cold; others are cooked, possibly in some kind of broth, and served either hot or chilled.

== See also ==
- Cucumber juice – Juice derived from cucumbers
- Cucumber sandwich – Sandwich made with cucumber
- List of soups
- Tzatziki – Cold cucumber–yogurt dip, soup, or sauce
- Mizeria – fresh cucumber salad
