= Cucumber soda =

Type of soft drink

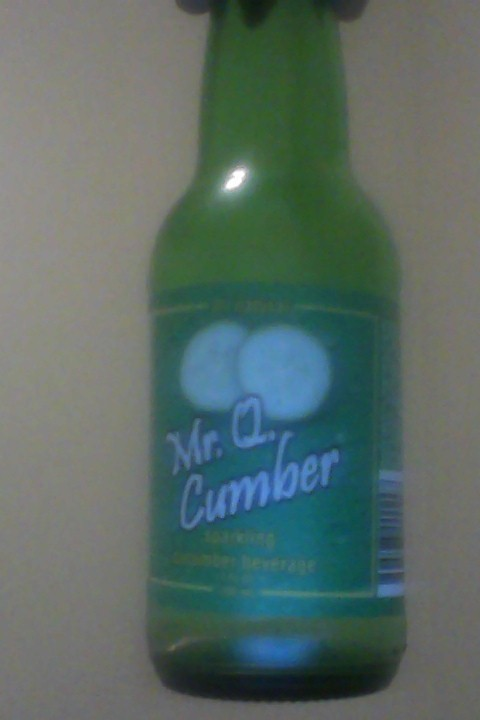
Mr. Q Cucumber Soda

Cucumber soda is a type of soda made by various manufacturers including Mr. Q Cumber. Pepsi offers an ice cucumber flavor in some markets. It is also made by home soda makers.

== See also ==
- Cucumber juice
- Cucumber sandwich
- Cucumber soup
- List of soft drink flavors
