= Cucumber juice =

Juice derived from cucumbers

Nutritional value per 1 ounce
- Energy: 9 kcal (38 kJ)
- Carbohydrates: 1 g
Vitamins and minerals
Vitamins	Quantity %DV^{†}
Vitamin C	2% 2 mg
Minerals	Quantity %DV^{†}
Calcium	3% 40 mg
Iron	1%.1 mg
Potassium	1% 41 mg
Sodium	0% 2 mg
- Nutritional content source
- ^{†}Percentages estimated using US recommendations for adults, except for potassium, which is estimated based on expert recommendation from the National Academies.

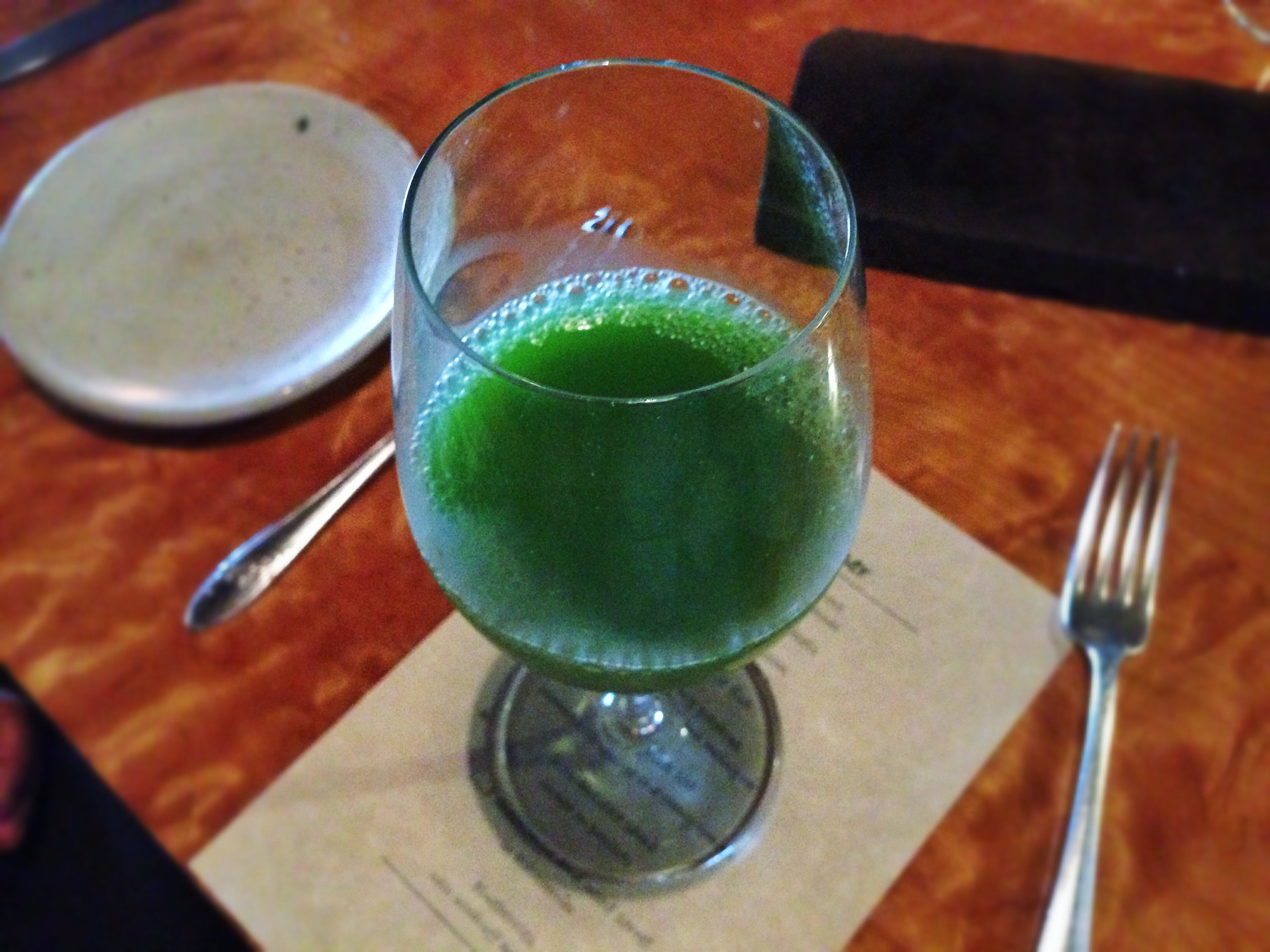
Cucumber juice

Cucumber juice is the juice derived from cucumbers produced by squeezing or pressing it. Cucumbers are 98% water.

Cucumber juice is used in beverages such as cocktails like the Bloody Mary, dishes such as cucumber soup, and in dips and salad dressings, such as green goddess dressing. Cucumber juice has significant amounts of potassium and is high in vitamin A. It also contains sterol and significant amounts of silicon.

Cucumber juice is used as an ingredient in cosmetics, soaps, shampoos, and lotions, and in eau de toilette and perfumes.

It was used in Russian traditional medicine to aid in the treatment of respiratory tract inflammation and to reduce lingering cough. In other traditions it was used to soothe heartburn and reduce acid in the stomach. For skin, it has been used to soothe burns and rashes. Cucumber juice has been described as a repellent against wood lice and fish-moths.

== See also ==
- Cucumber soda
- Juicing
- List of juices
