= Caropodium =

Scientific classification
- Kingdom: Plantae
- Clade: Tracheophytes
- Clade: Angiosperms
- Clade: Eudicots
- Clade: Asterids
- Order: Apiales
- Family: Apiaceae
- Genus: Caropodium; Stapf & Wettst.

Genus of flowering plants

Caropodium is a genus of flowering plants belonging to the family Apiaceae.

Its native range is Turkey to Iran.

Species:

- Caropodium haussknechtii (Boiss.) Schischk.
- Caropodium platycarpum (Boiss. & Hausskn.) Schischk.
- Caropodium pterocarpum (Boiss.) Schischk.
