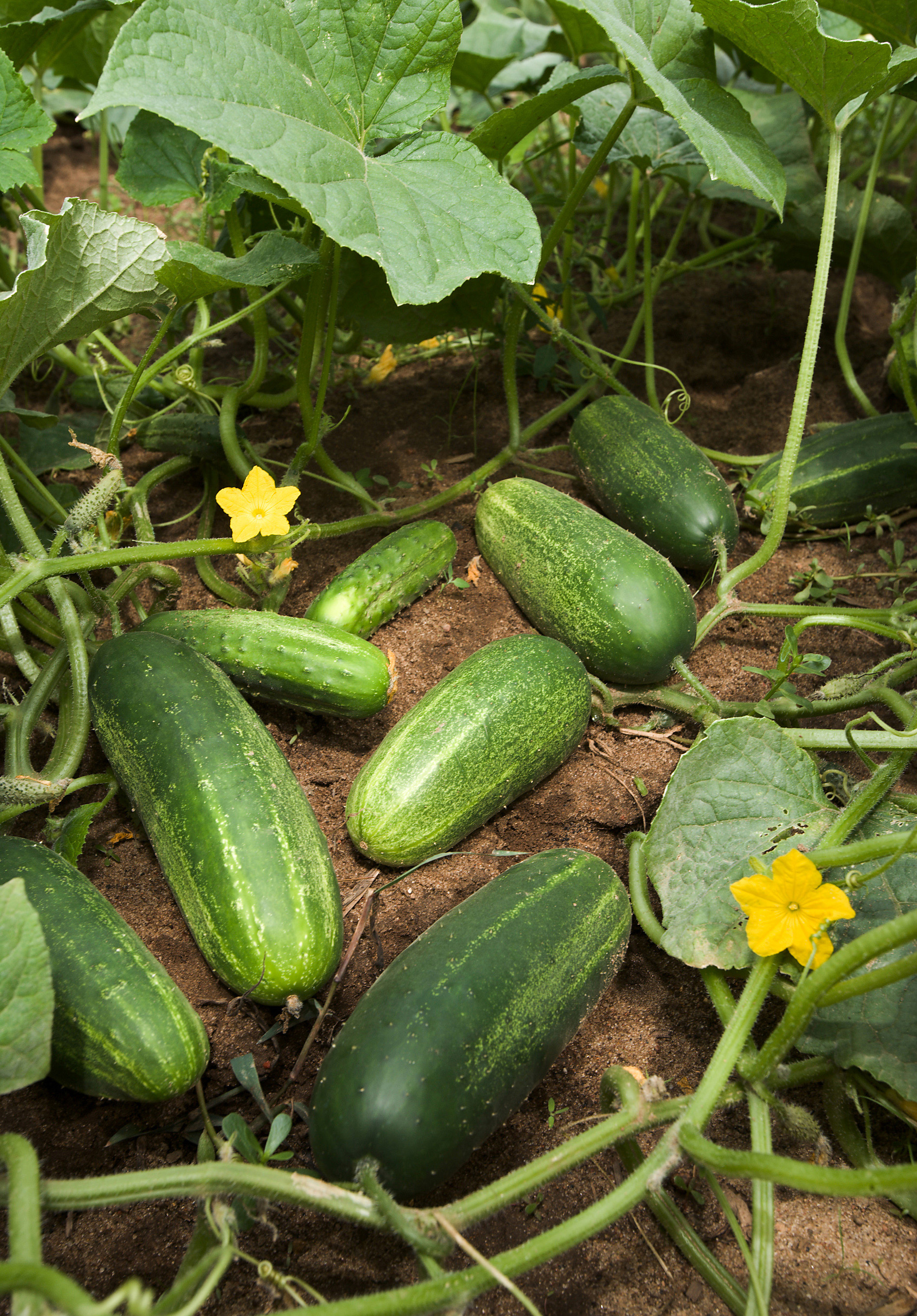
- Cucumbers growing on vines
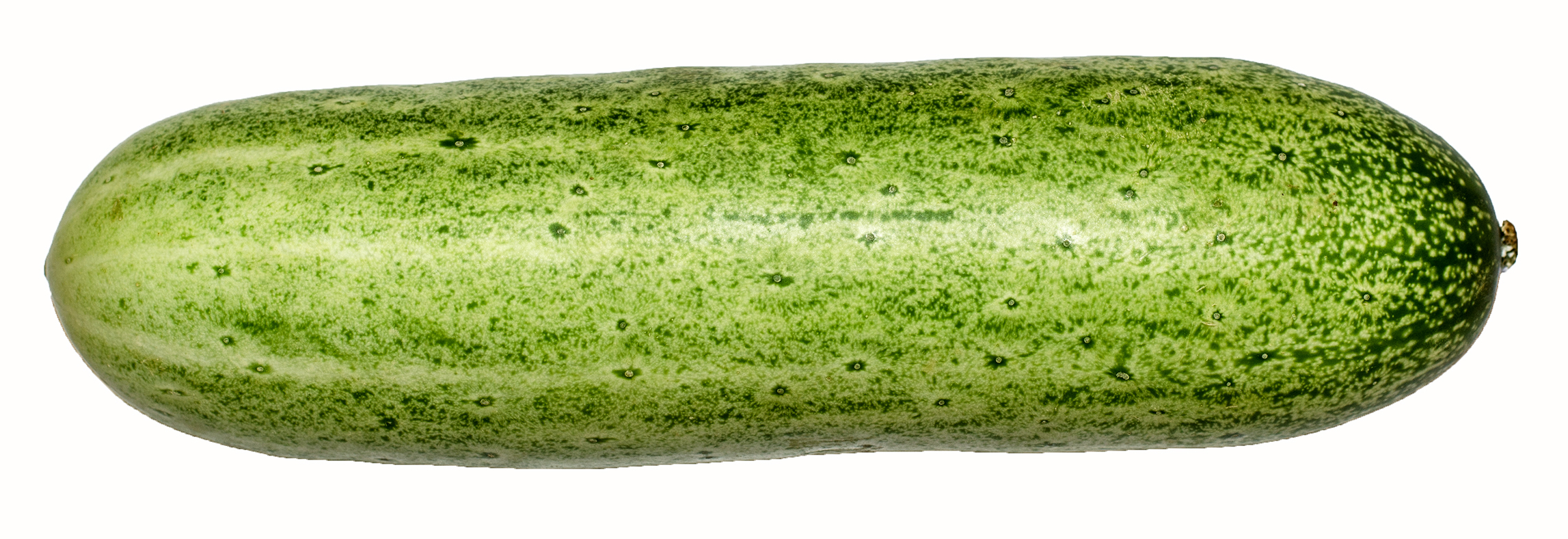
- A single cucumber fruit

Scientific classification
- Kingdom: Plantae
- Clade: Tracheophytes
- Clade: Angiosperms
- Clade: Eudicots
- Clade: Rosids
- Order: Cucurbitales
- Family: Cucurbitaceae
- Genus: Cucumis
- Species: C. sativus

Binomial name
- Cucumis sativus L.

= Cucumber =

Species of flowering plant with edible fruits

The cucumber (Cucumis sativus) is a widely-cultivated creeping vine plant in the family Cucurbitaceae that bears cylindrical to spherical fruits, used as culinary vegetables. Considered an annual plant, there are three main types: slicing, pickling, and seedless.

The cucumber originates in Asia, in a region extending from India, Nepal, Bangladesh, China (Yunnan, Guizhou, Guangxi), and Northern Thailand.

Cucumbers have been cultivated for at least 3,000 years, and were eaten all year round by the Roman Emperor Tiberius. In the Middle Ages, Charlemagne had them grown for him, and the Spanish brought them to the Americas in the Columbian exchange in 1494. World production is led by China with over three quarters of the total.

== Description ==
The cucumber is an annual creeping vine that roots in the ground and grows up trellises or other supporting frames, wrapping around supports with thin, spiraling tendrils. The plant can root in a soilless medium, then sprawl along the ground in the absence of a supporting structure. The vine has large leaves that form a canopy over the fruits.

The fruit of typical cultivars of cucumber is roughly cylindrical, but elongated with tapered ends, and may be as large as 62 centimeters (24 in) long and 10 centimeters (4 in) in diameter.

Cucumber fruits consist of 95% water (see nutrition table). In botanical terms, the cucumber is classified as a pepo, a type of botanical berry with seeds and an outer rind. In a culinary context, it is considered a vegetable.

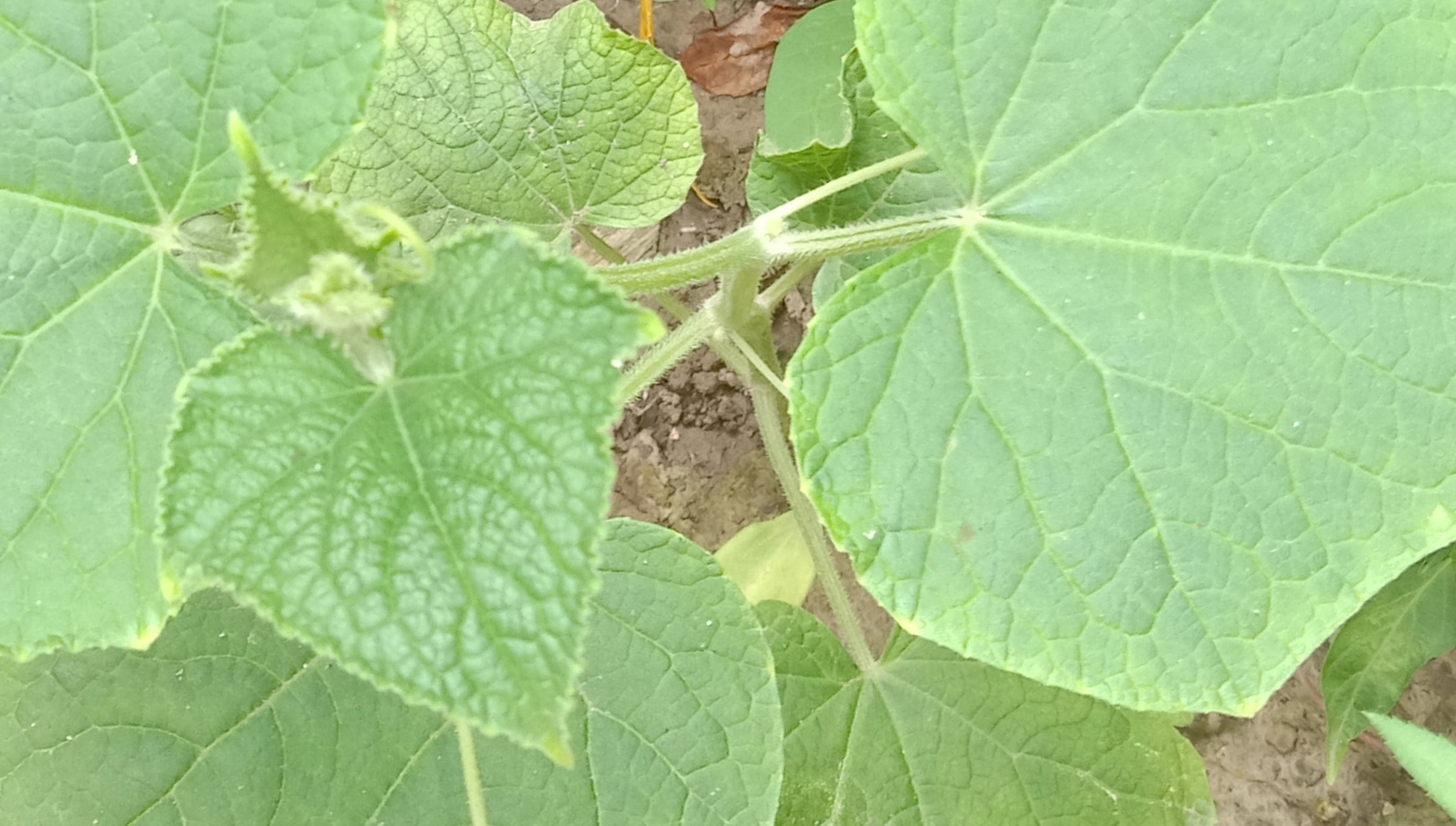
Leaves

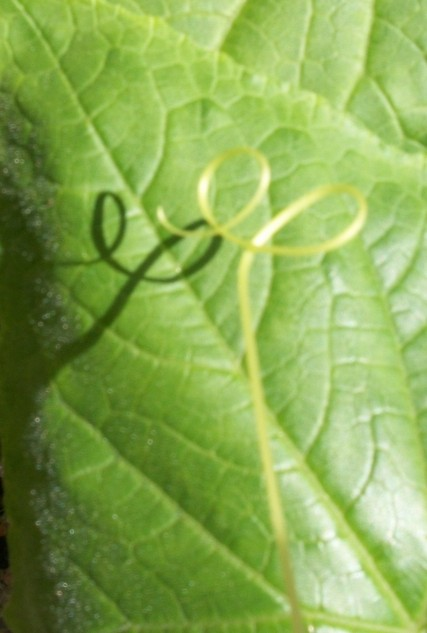
A tendril facilitates climbing

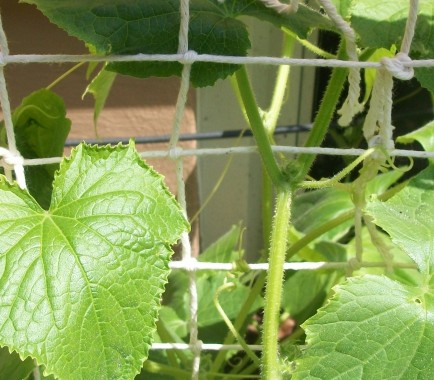
A string lattice supports vine growth

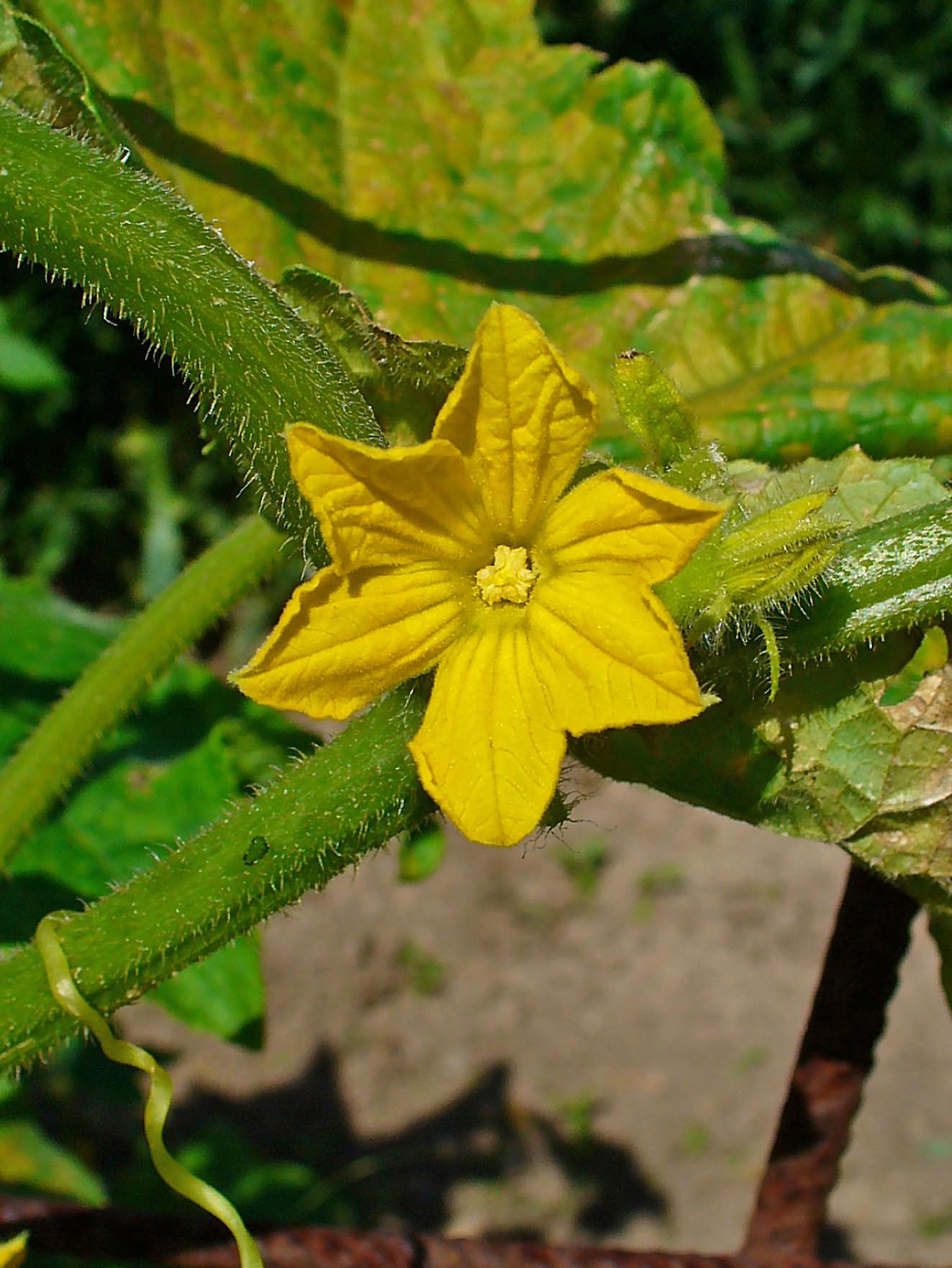
Flower

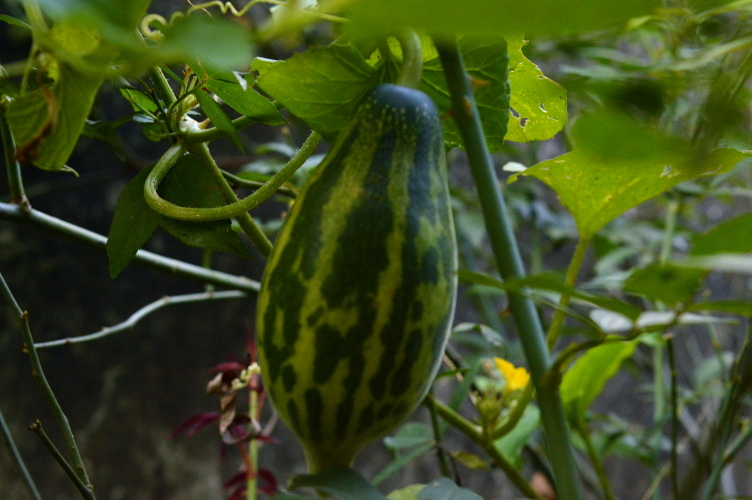
A bulb-shaped cucumber hanging on the vine

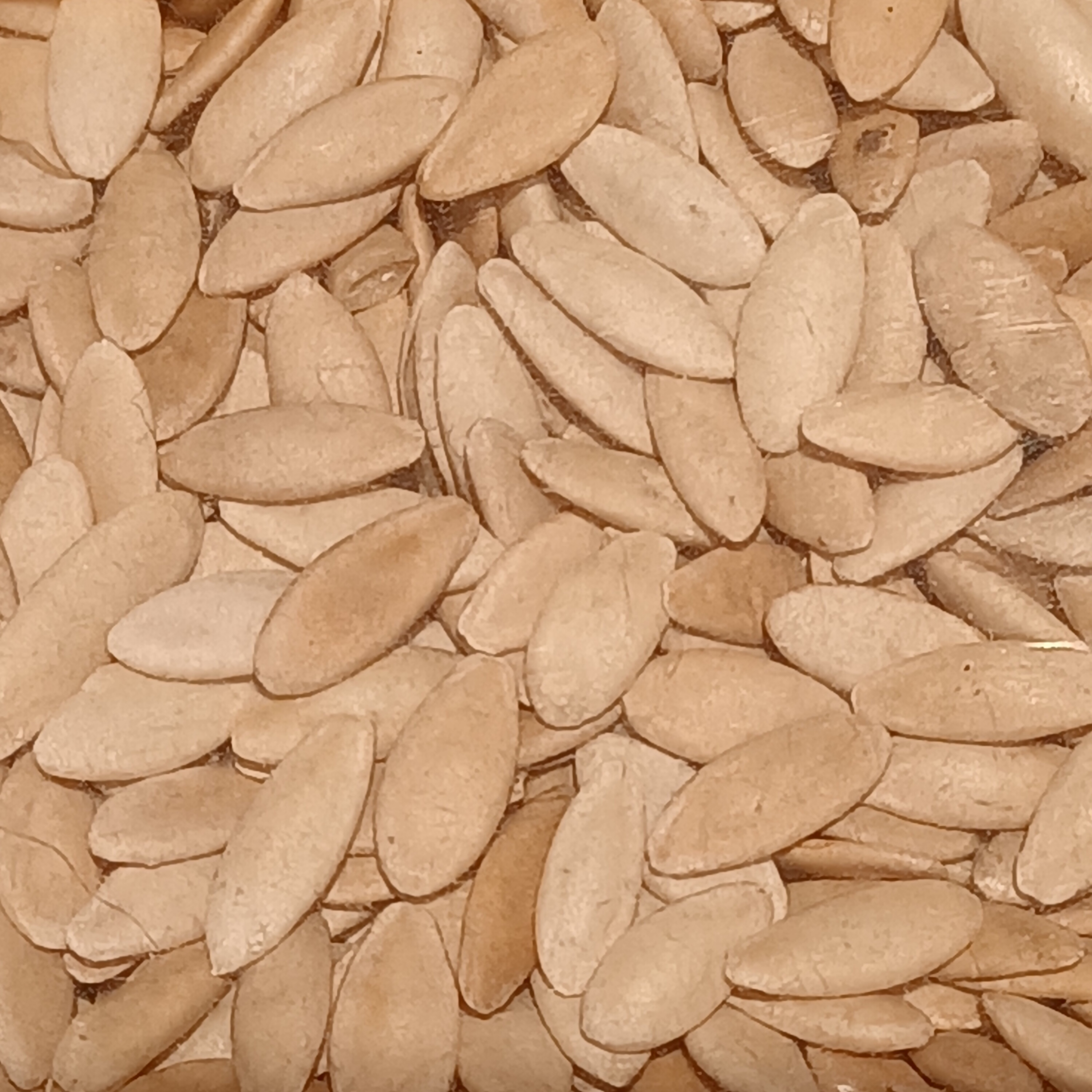
Seeds

=== Cultivars and pollination ===
Most cucumber cultivars are seeded and require pollination. For this purpose, thousands of honey beehives are carried to cucumber fields each year just before bloom. Cucumbers can be pollinated by bumblebees and several other wild bee species. Most cucumbers that require pollination are self-incompatible, thus requiring the pollen of another plant in order to form seeds and fruit. Some self-compatible cultivars exist that are related to the 'Lemon cucumber' cultivar.

Some cultivars are parthenocarpic, creating seedless fruit without pollination; these are often grown in greenhouses. However, fruit set is significantly higher when bees visit the flowers.

Traditional cultivars produce male blossoms first, then female, in about equivalent numbers. Newer gynoecious hybrid cultivars produce almost all female blossoms. They may have a pollenizer cultivar interplanted, and the number of beehives per unit area is increased, but temperature changes induce male flowers even on these plants, which may be sufficient for pollination to occur.

Example cultivars

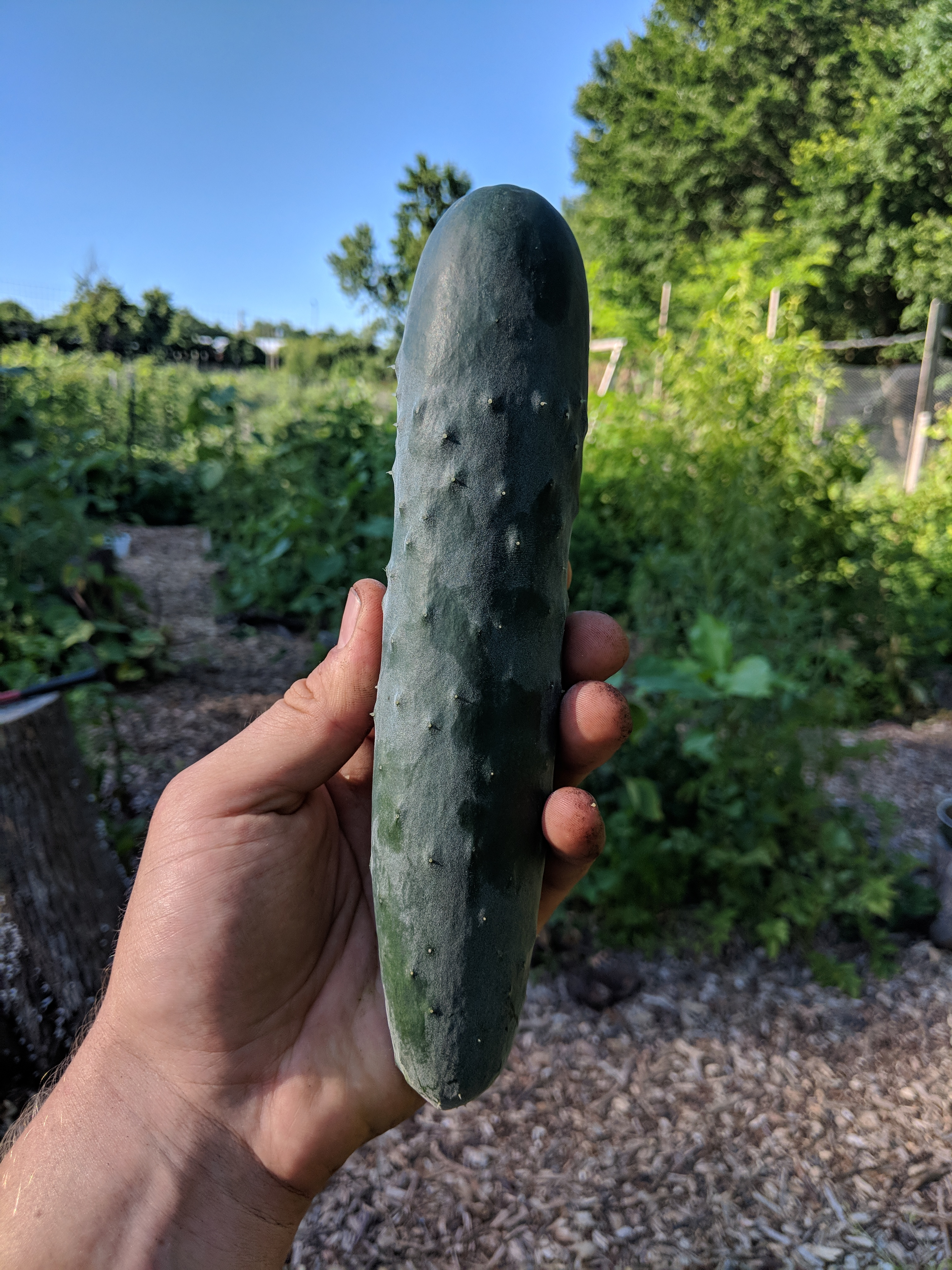
Salad cucumber

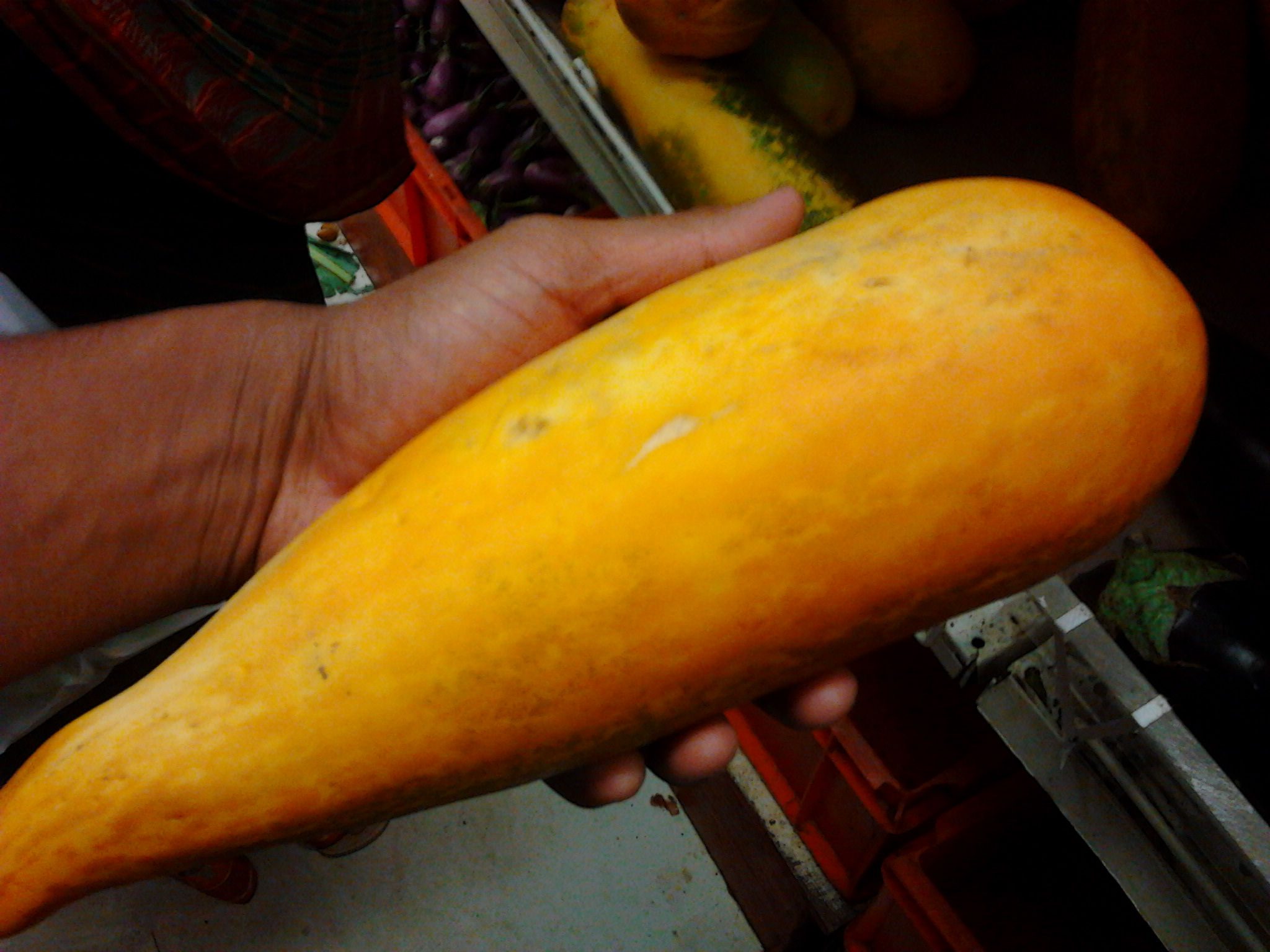
An Indian yellow cucumber

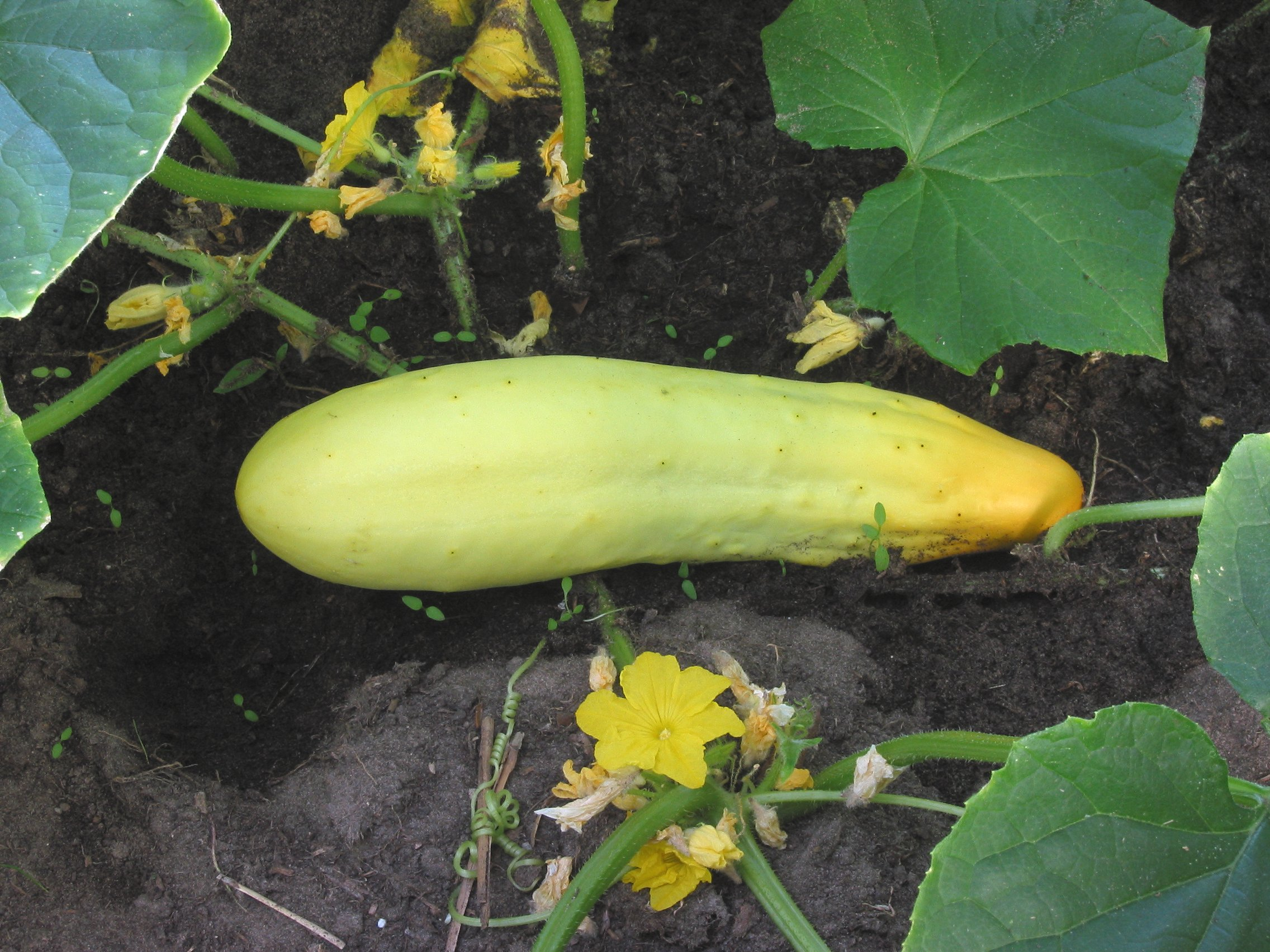
Komkommer (Cucumis sativus 'Gele Tros')

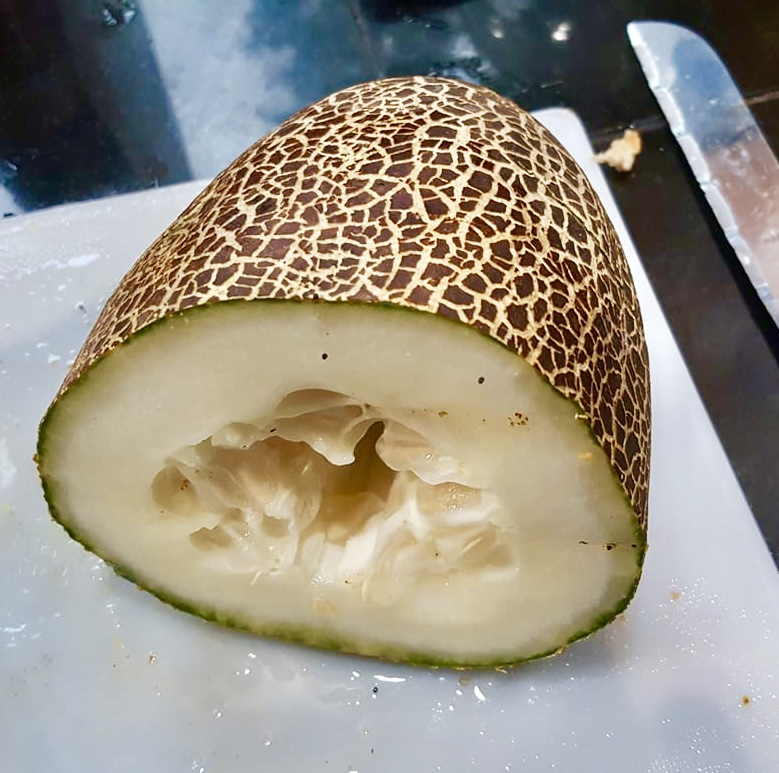
A varietal grown by the Hmong people with textured skin and large seeds

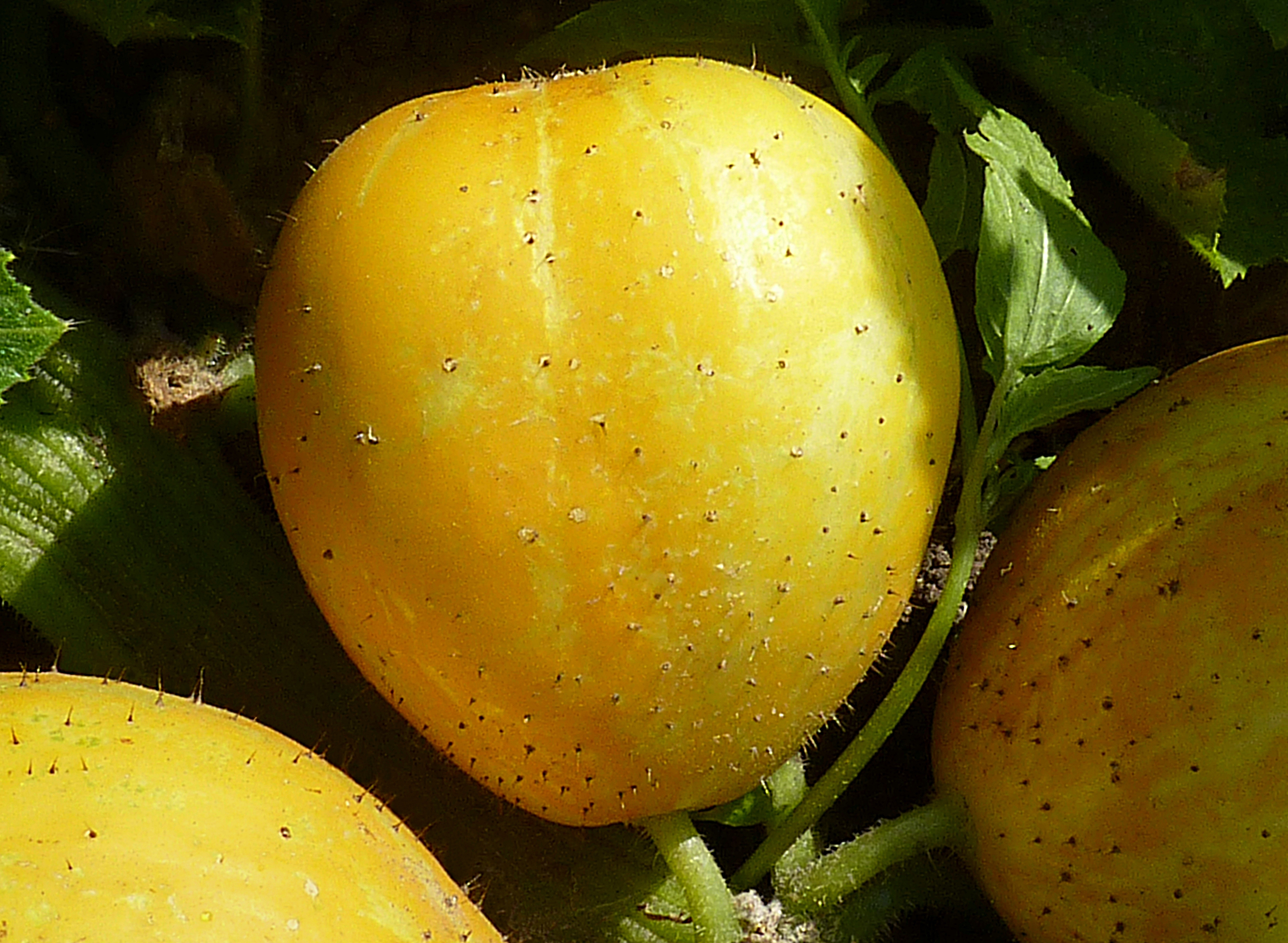
Lemon cucumber

=== Herbivore defense ===
Phytochemicals in cucumbers may discourage natural foraging by herbivores, such as insects, nematodes or wildlife. As a possible defense mechanism, cucumbers produce cucurbitacin C, which causes a bitter taste in some cucumber varieties. This potential mechanism is under preliminary research to identify whether cucumbers are able to deter herbivores and environmental stresses by using an intrinsic chemical defense, particularly in the leaves, cotyledons, pedicel, carpopodium, and fruit.

Genomic information
- NCBI ID: 3659
- Ploidy: diploid
- Genome size: 323.99 Mb
- Sequenced organelle: mitochondrion
- Organelle size: 244.82 Mb
- Year of completion: 2011

=== Taxonomy and genetics ===
Cucumis sativus was described by Carl Linnaeus in 1753 in his Species Plantarum. As of October 2022, Plants of the World Online accepted 61 species in the genus Cucumis, also created by Linnaeus.

C. sativus is the sole member of the genus to have 2N=14 chromosomes. In 2009, the cucumber genome was sequenced. A study of genetic recombination during meiosis provided a high resolution landscape of meiotic DNA double strand-breaks and genetic crossovers in the species.

== Production ==
Cucumber production 2024, millions of tonnes
China	68.6
Turkey	1.7
Russia	1.7
Uzbekistan	1.0
Mexico	0.96
World	87.8
Source: FAOSTAT of the United Nations

In 2024, world production of cucumbers and gherkins was 88 million tonnes, led by China with 78% of the total (table).

Production of cucumbers and gherkins

Cucumber and gherkin yield

== Consumption ==
=== Nutrition ===
Cucumber, with peel, raw
Nutritional value per 100 g (3.5 oz)
- Energy: 65 kJ (16 kcal)
- Carbohydrates: 3.63 g
- Sugars: 1.67
- Dietary fiber: 0.5 g
- Fat: 0.11 g
- Protein: 0.65 g
Vitamins and minerals
Vitamins	Quantity %DV^{†}
Thiamine (B1)	2% 0.027 mg
Riboflavin (B2)	3% 0.033 mg
Niacin (B3)	1% 0.098 mg
Pantothenic acid (B5)	5% 0.259 mg
Vitamin B6	2% 0.04 mg
Folate (B9)	2% 7 μg
Vitamin C	3% 2.8 mg
Vitamin K	14% 16.4 μg
Minerals	Quantity %DV^{†}
Calcium	1% 16 mg
Iron	2% 0.28 mg
Magnesium	3% 13 mg
Manganese	3% 0.079 mg
Phosphorus	2% 24 mg
Potassium	5% 147 mg
Sodium	0% 2 mg
Zinc	2% 0.2 mg
- Other constituents: Quantity
- Water: 95.23 g
- Link to USDA database entry
- ^{†}Percentages estimated using US recommendations for adults, except for potassium, which is estimated based on expert recommendation from the National Academies.

Raw cucumber (with peel) is 95% water, 4% carbohydrates, 1% protein, and contains negligible fat (table). In a reference amount of 100 grams (3 1/2 ounces), raw cucumber provides 65 kilojoules (16 kilocalories) of food energy, and has a low content of micronutrients notable only for vitamin K at 14% of the Daily Value (table).

=== Aroma and taste ===
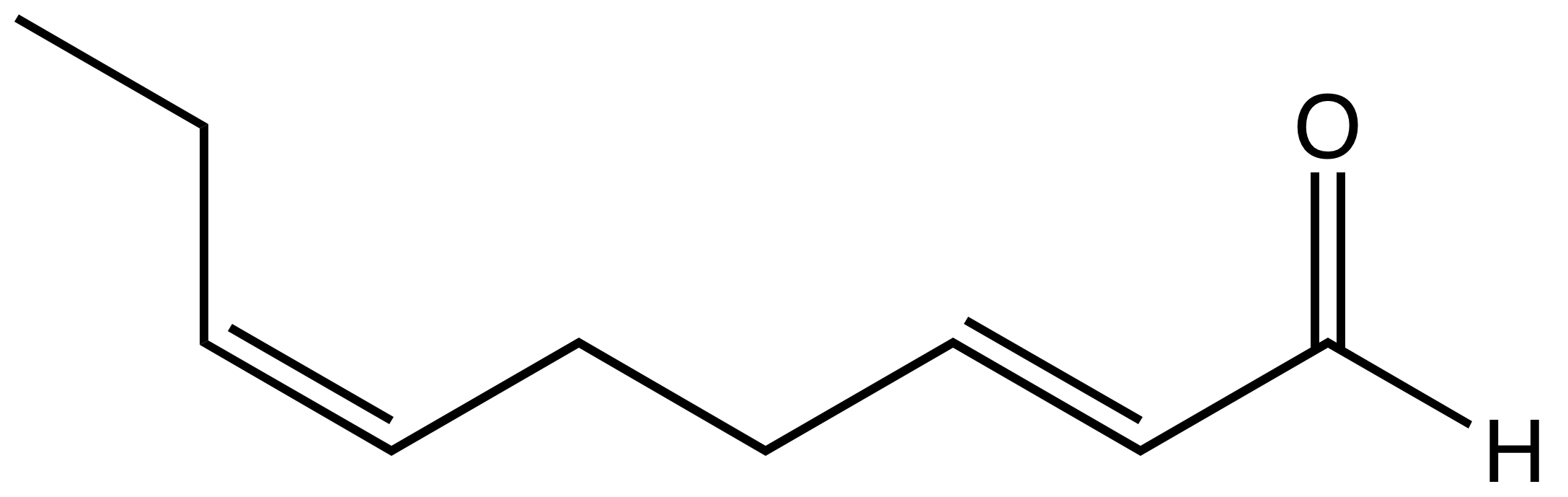
trans,cis-2,6-Nonadienal, or cucumber aldehyde, is a component of the distinctive aroma of cucumbers.

Depending on variety, cucumbers may have a mild melon aroma and flavor, in part resulting from unsaturated aldehydes, such as (E,Z)-nona-2,6-dienal, and the cis- and trans- isomers of 2-nonenal. The slightly bitter taste of cucumber rind results from cucurbitacins. The polyphenol content is higher in unpeeled cucumbers.

=== Culinary uses ===
In horticulture, cucumbers are classified into three main cultivar groups: slicing, pickling, and seedless/burpless. Cucumbers grown to eat fresh are called slicing cucumbers. The main varieties of slicers mature on vines with large leaves that provide shading. Slicers grown commercially for the North American market are generally longer, smoother, more uniform in color, and have much tougher skin. In contrast, those in other countries, often called European cucumbers, are smaller and have thinner, more delicate skin, often with fewer seeds. This variety is called a 'telegraph cucumber'.

Pickling with brine, sugar, vinegar, and spices creates flavored products from cucumbers and other foods. Cucumbers grown for pickling are shorter, thicker, and thinner-skinned than other varieties. Gherkins, cornichons, or baby pickles, are small cucumbers, typically those 2.5 to 12.5 centimetres (1 to 5 in) in length, often with bumpy skin, which are typically used for pickling. The word gherkin comes from the early modern Dutch gurken or augurken ('small pickled cucumber'). The term is used in the name for Cucumis anguria, the West Indian gherkin, a closely related species.

Burpless cucumbers are sweeter and have a thinner skin than other varieties of cucumber. They are reputed to be easy to digest and to have a pleasant taste. They can grow as long as 60 centimeters (2 ft), are nearly seedless, and have a delicate skin. Most commonly grown in greenhouses, these parthenocarpic cucumbers are often found in grocery markets, shrink-wrapped in plastic. They are marketed as either burpless or seedless, as the seeds and skin of other varieties of cucumbers are said to give some people gas.

Cucumber shoots are regularly consumed as a vegetable, especially in rural areas. In Thailand they are often served with a crab meat sauce. They can be stir fried or used in soups.

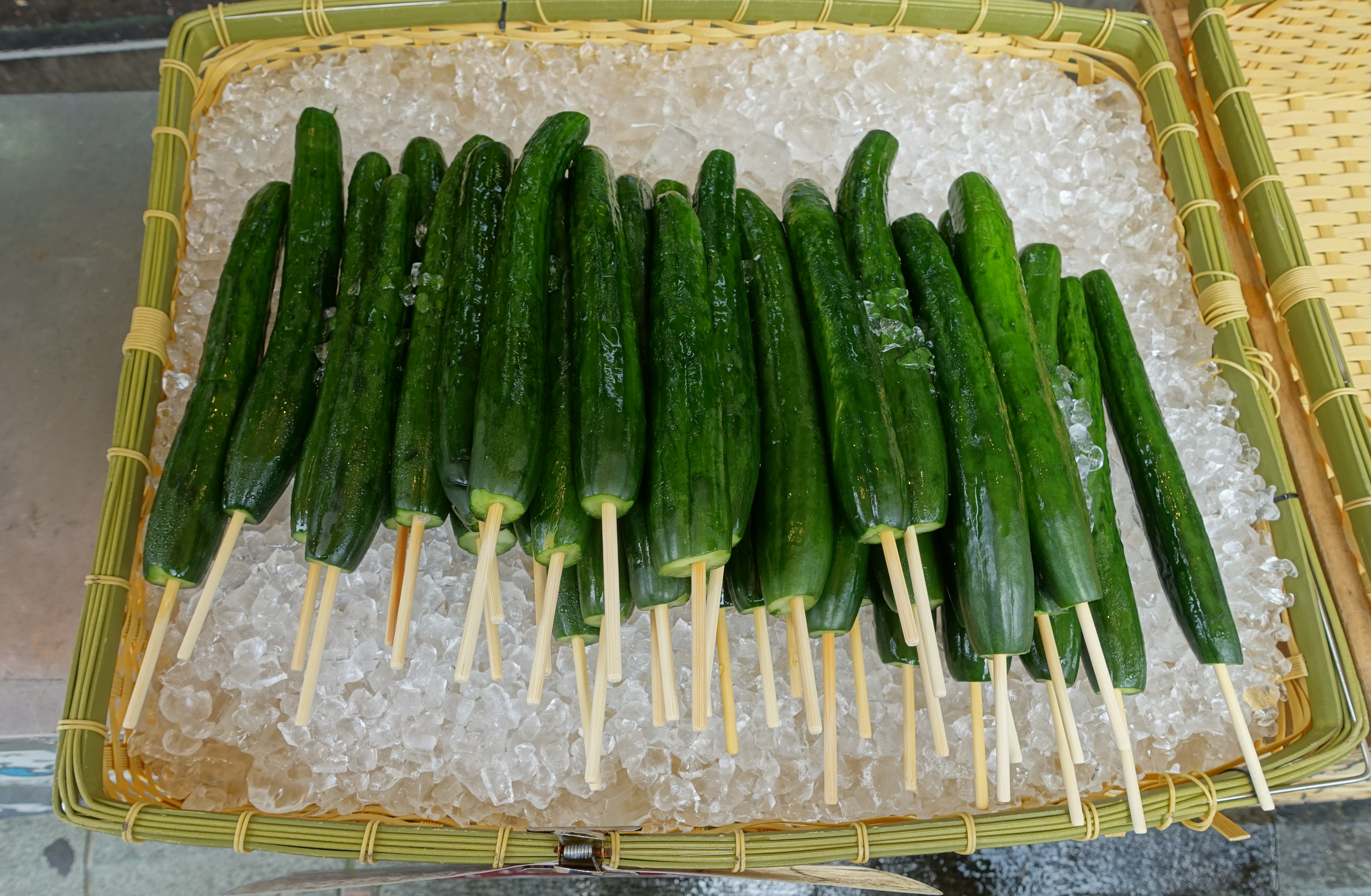
Japanese asazuke pickled cucumbers sold as street food on Enoshima island

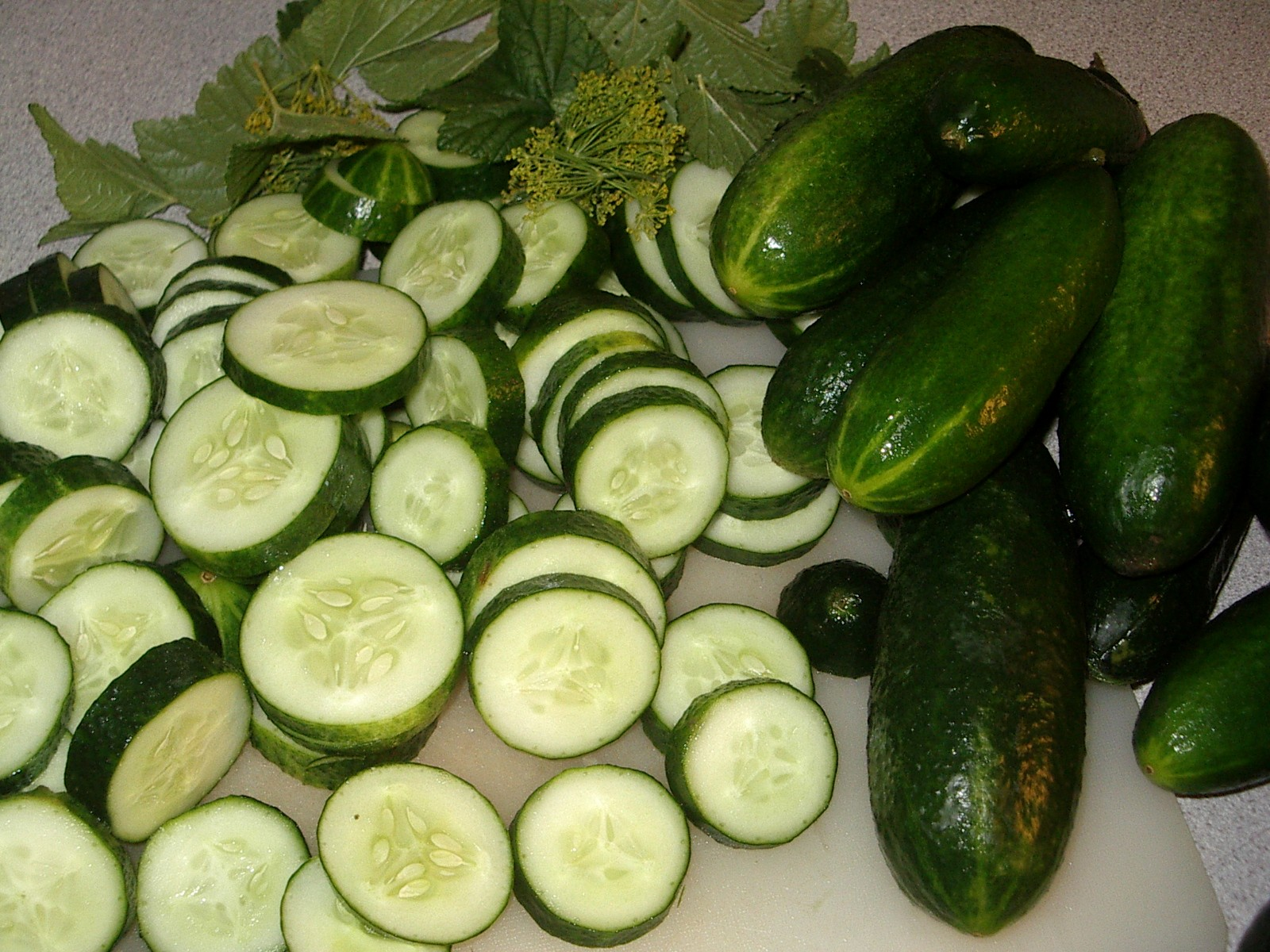
A Scandinavian cucumber in slices

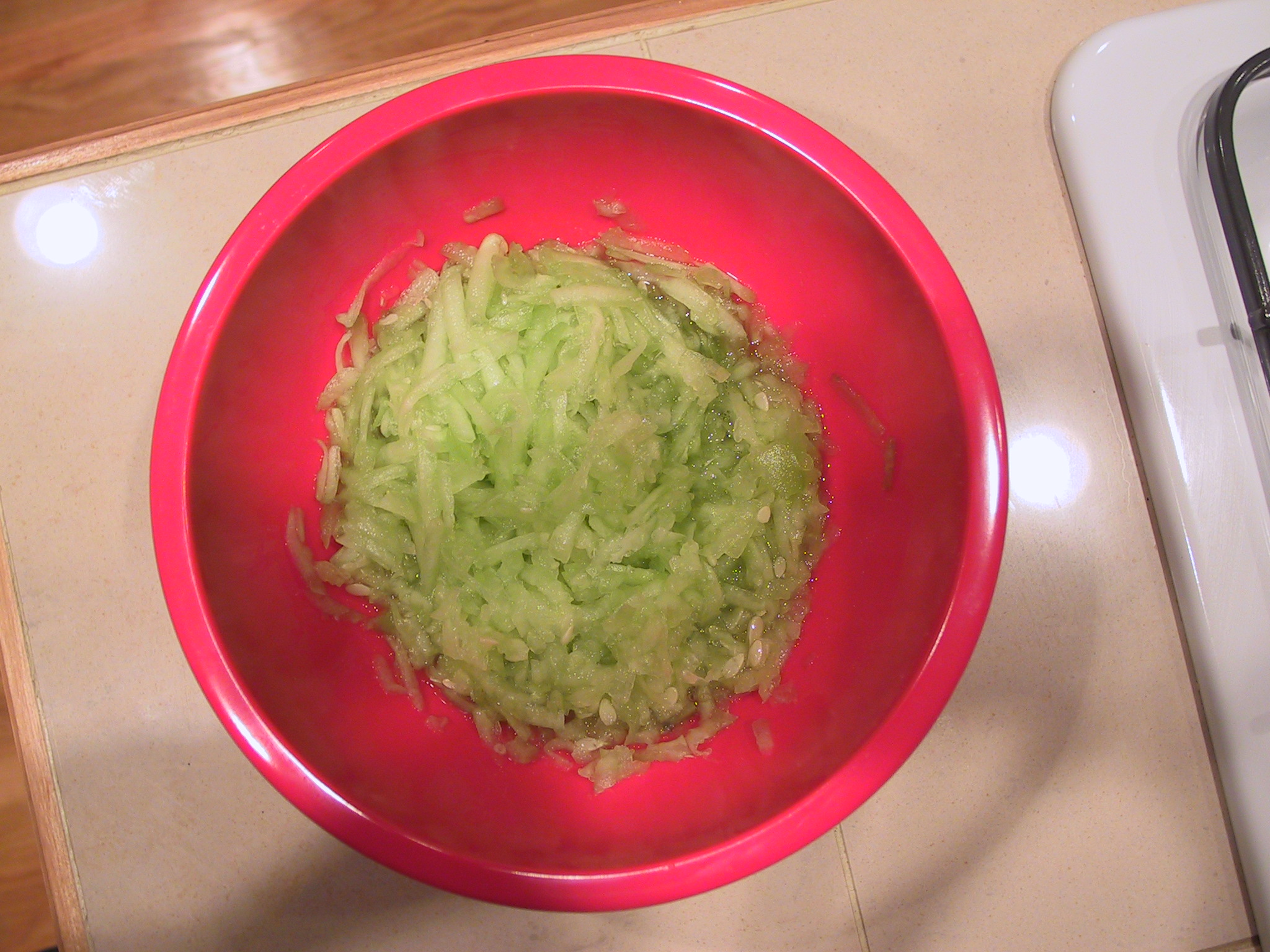
Grated cucumber

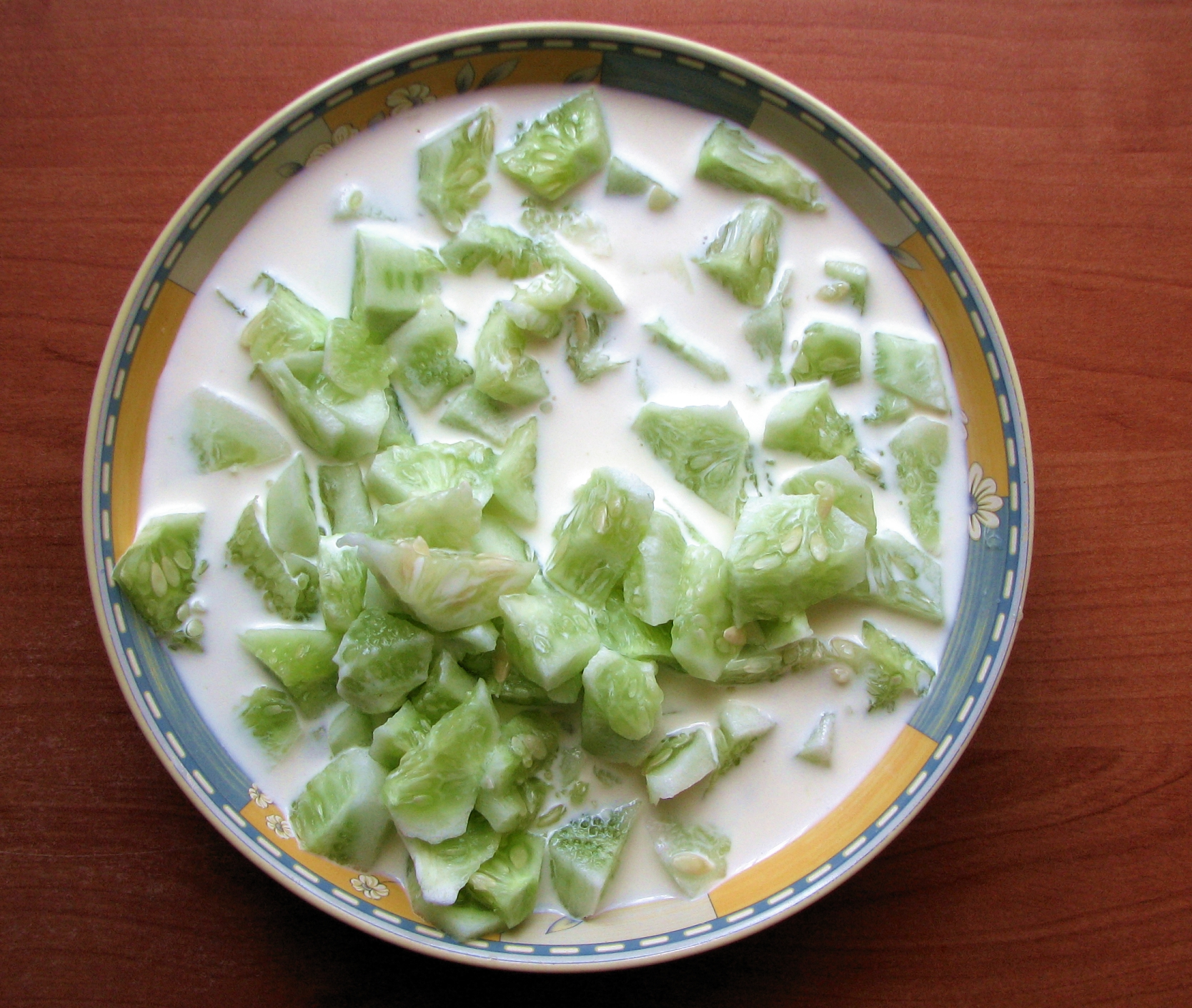
As a side dish with yoghurt, raita or mizeria

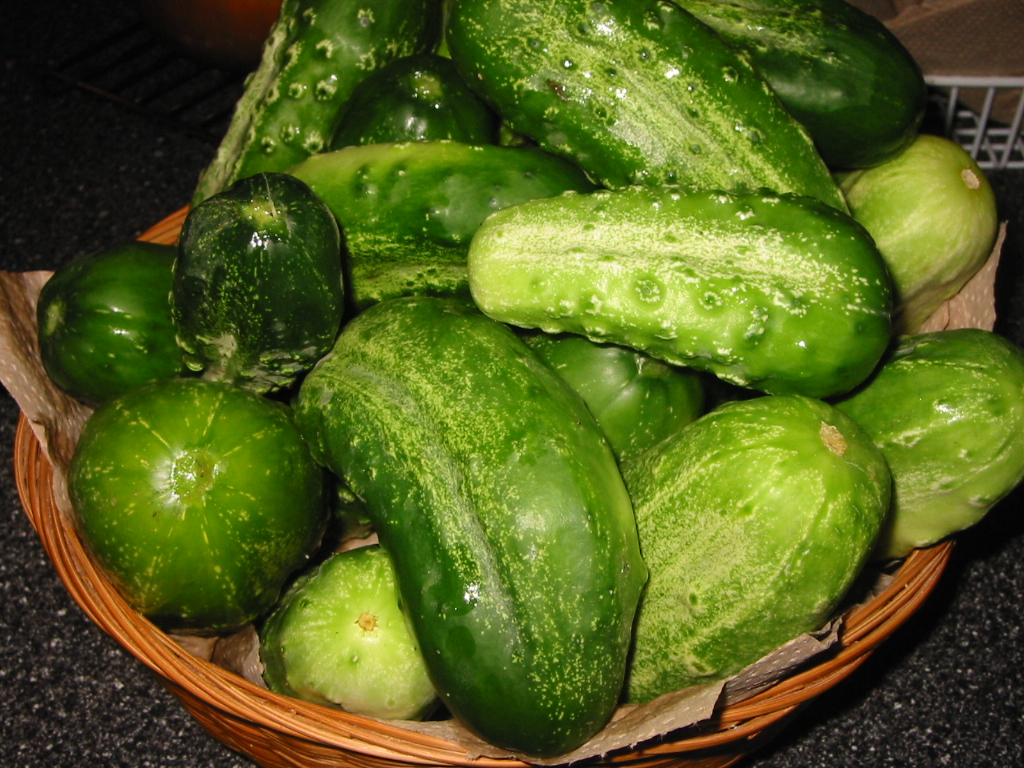
Pickling cucumbers

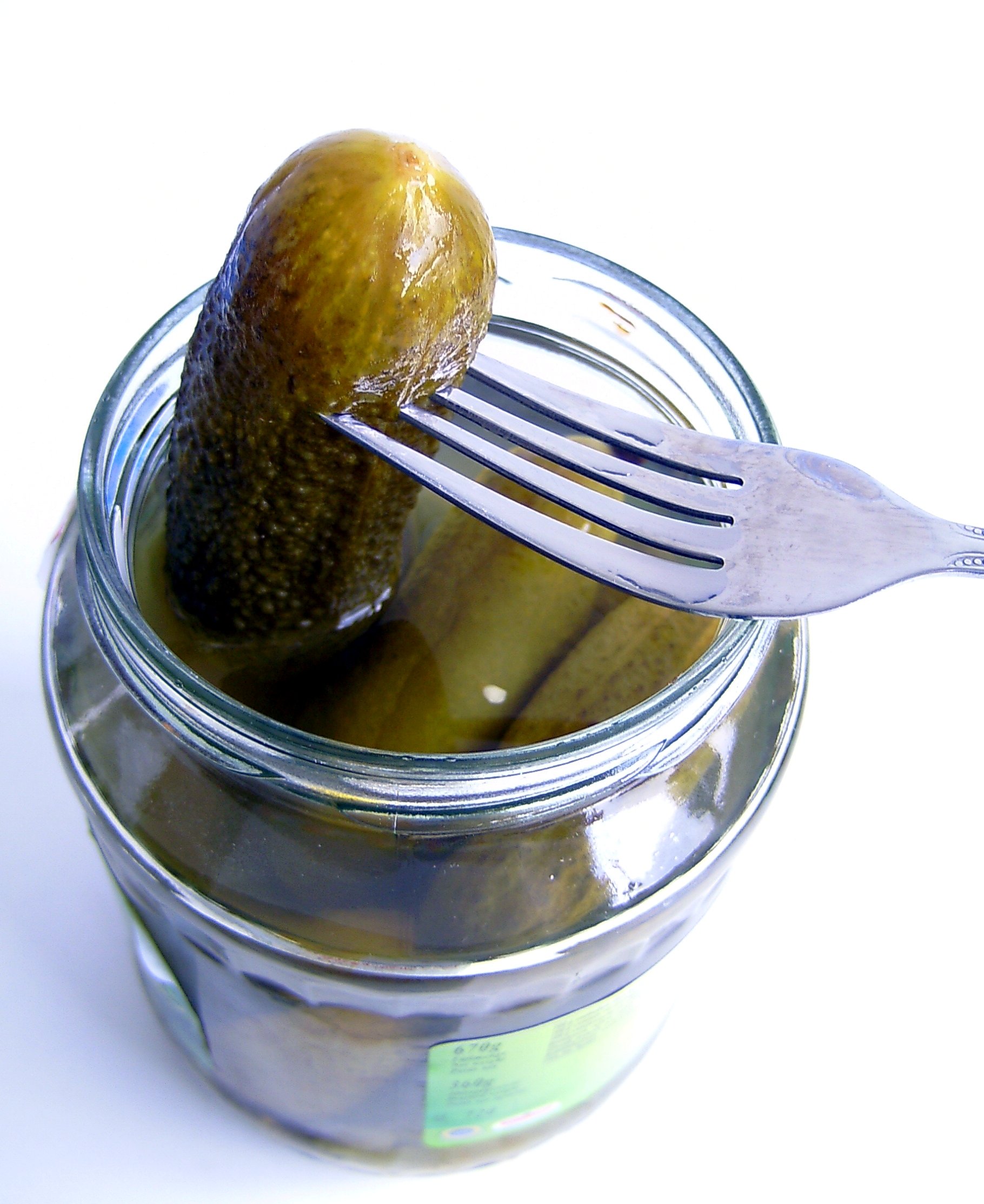
Gherkins

== Cultivation history ==
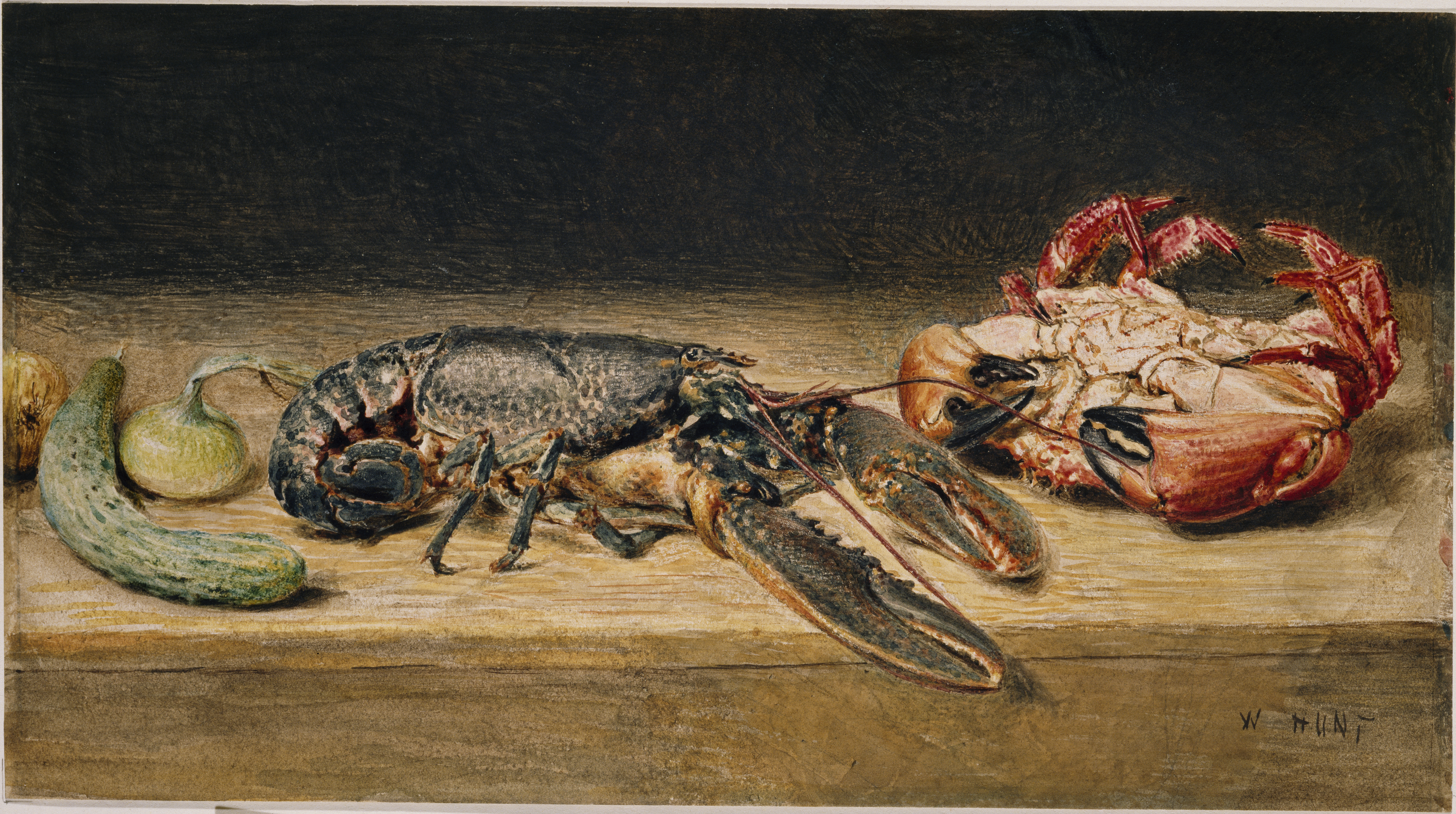
Lobster, Crab, and a Cucumber by William Henry Hunt (watercolour, 1826 or 1827)

Cultivated for at least 3,000 years, "Cucumis sativus" were domesticated in India from wild "C. sativus var. hardwickii". where a great many varieties have been observed, along with its closest living relative, Cucumis hystrix. The three main cultivar groups of cucumber are Eurasian cucumbers (slicing cucumbers eaten raw and immature), East Asian cucumbers (pickling cucumbers), and Xishuangbanna cucumbers. Based on demographic modelling, the East Asian C. sativus cultivars diverged from the Indian cultivars about 2,500 years ago. It was probably introduced to Europe by the Greeks or Romans. Records of cucumber cultivation appear in France in the 9th century, England in the 14th century, and in North America by the mid-16th century.

=== Roman Empire ===
According to Pliny the Elder, the Emperor Tiberius had the cucumber on his table daily during summer and winter. In order to have it available for his table every day of the year, the Romans reportedly used artificial growing methods (similar to the greenhouse system) using mirrorstone, Pliny's lapis specularis, believed to have been sheet mica: "Indeed, he was never without [cucumbers]; for he had raised beds made in frames upon wheels, by means of which the cucumbers were moved and exposed to the full heat of the sun; while, in winter, they were withdrawn, and placed under the protection of frames glazed with mirrorstone." They were cultivated in specularia, cucumber houses glazed with oiled cloth. Pliny describes the vegetable as very small, probably like a gherkin. Separately, he describes the preparation of a medication known as elaterium, but this may have been Ecballium elaterium, known in pre-Linnean times as Cucumis silvestris or Cucumis asininus ('wild cucumber' or 'donkey cucumber'), a different species. Pliny writes about several other varieties of cucumber, including the cultivated cucumber, and remedies from the different types (9 from the cultivated; 5 from the "anguine;" and 26 from the "wild").

=== Middle Ages ===
Charlemagne had cucumbers grown in his gardens in the 8th/9th century. They were reportedly introduced into England in the early 14th century, lost, then reintroduced approximately 250 years later. The Spaniards (through the Italian Christopher Columbus) brought cucumbers to Haiti in 1494. In 1535, Jacques Cartier, a French explorer, found "very great cucumbers" grown on the site of what is now Montreal.

=== Early-modern era ===
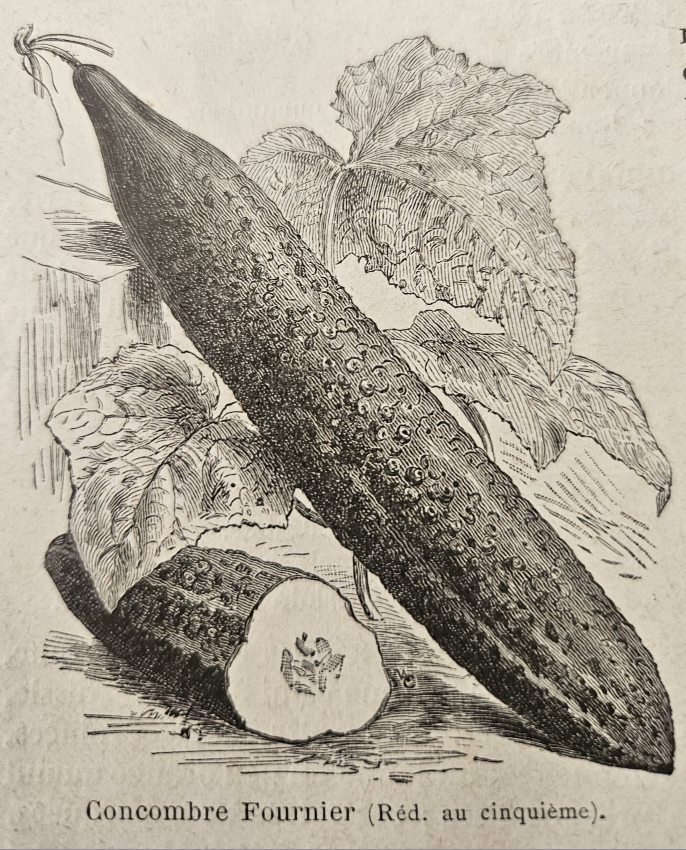
Concombre Fournier in "Les plantes potagères" Vilmorin 1925

Throughout the 16th century, European trappers, traders, bison hunters, and explorers bartered for the products of American Indian agriculture. The tribes of the Great Plains and the Rocky Mountains learned from the Spanish how to grow European crops. The farmers on the Great Plains included the Mandan and Abenaki. They obtained cucumbers and watermelons from the Spanish, and added them to the crops they were already growing, including several varieties of corn and beans, pumpkins, squash, and gourd plants. The Iroquois were growing them when the first Europeans visited them. In 1630, the Reverend Francis Higginson wrote in his book New-Englands Plantation that "The countrie aboundeth naturally with store of roots of great varietie and good to eat. Our turnips, parsnips, and carrots are here both bigger and sweeter than is ordinary to be found in England. Here are store of pompions, cowcumbers, and other things of that nature which I know not". In New England Prospect (1633, England), William Wood wrote that "The ground affords very good kitchin gardens, for Turneps, Parsnips, Carrots, Radishes, and Pompions, Muskmillons, Isquoter-squashes, coucumbars, Onyons, and whatever grows well in England grows as well there, many things being better and larger."

=== Age of Enlightenment ===
Samuel Pepys wrote in his diary on 22 August 1663 that "this day Sir W. Batten tells me that Mr. Newburne is dead of eating cowcumbers, of which the other day I heard of another, I think. John Evelyn in 1699 wrote that the cucumber, "however dress'd, was thought fit to be thrown away, being accounted little better than poyson". According to the 18th-century British lexicographer and wit Samuel Johnson, it was commonly said among English physicians that a cucumber "should be well sliced, and dressed with pepper and vinegar, and then thrown out, as good for nothing".

== See also ==
- Armenian cucumber, a variety of melon that resembles a cucumber
- Cucumber blessing
- Cucumber cake
- Cucumber juice
- Cucumber sandwich
- Cucumber soda
- Cucumber soup
- Sea cucumber, named for its resemblance to the fruit
