= European cucumber =

Variety of cucumber

The European cucumber (also known as English cucumber or Hot House cucumber) is a variety of cucumber that has smaller seeds and is longer and slimmer than other varieties.

It does not have a layer of wax on it, and the skin is tender when ripe.

These cucumbers may come wrapped in plastic for longer shelf life and better freshness. They do not have to be seeded or peeled before consuming.

Often used in salads and for pickling, European cucumbers can be more expensive and less flavorful than some other types of cucumber.
