= Marianna Yerasimos =

Greek food writer (born 1947)

- Born: 1947 (age 78–79); Istanbul, Turkey
- Occupation: Writer
- Writing career
- Subjects: Food, Ottoman cuisine

Marianna Yerasimos is a Greek food writer from Istanbul.

== Early life ==
Yerasimos was born in Istanbul in 1947. She attended the Zapyon Rum Kız Lisesi, then graduated from the Department of Psychology at Istanbul University, specializing in child education.

From 1973 to 1984, she was among the founders of Gözlem Yayınları publishing house, where she worked particularly as an editor of educational and children's books.

From 1988 to 2006, Yerasimos founded Galeri Alfa, Istanbul's first specialized engraving art gallery. Her work during this period focused on exhibiting and writing material related to engravings depicting the daily life of Ottoman society.

In 2002, Yerasimos wrote the book 500 yıllık Osmanlı Mutfağı ("500 Years of Ottoman Cuisine"), which examines the development and transformation of Ottoman cuisine and includes 99 Ottoman recipes adapted to contemporary cuisine. Published in Turkish, English, and Greek, the book has had a total of 13 editions in these three languages to date.

In 2011, Yerasimos published her book Evliya Çelebi Seyahatnâme’sinde Yemek Kültürü: Yorumlar ve Sistematik Dizin ("Food Culture as Mentioned in Evliya Celebi’s Book of Travels (Seyahatname): Comments and Systematic Index"). Based on Evliya Celebi's ten-volume Seyahatnâme, this work presents a panorama of the dietary habits of the 17th-century Ottoman world and its surroundings. It was awarded the "En iyi Gastronomi Kitabı" prize in 2012 by Dünya Kitap / Ehlikeyif Dergisi.

== Publications ==
=== Books ===
• 500 Yıllık Osmanlı Mutfağı, 2005
• Evliya Çelebi’nin Seyahatnâmesi’nde Yemek Kültürü: Yorumlar ve Sistematik Dizin, 2012
• İstanbul'un Ortodoks Esnafı 1833-1860, 2014
• İstanbullu Rum Bir Ailenin Mutfak Serüveni: Tarifler, Hikayeler, Anılar, 2019

=== Portfolios and Monographs ===
• Eski İstanbul'da Sakalar, Sebilciler, Sucular, 1991
