= Mizeria =

Type of salad from Poland

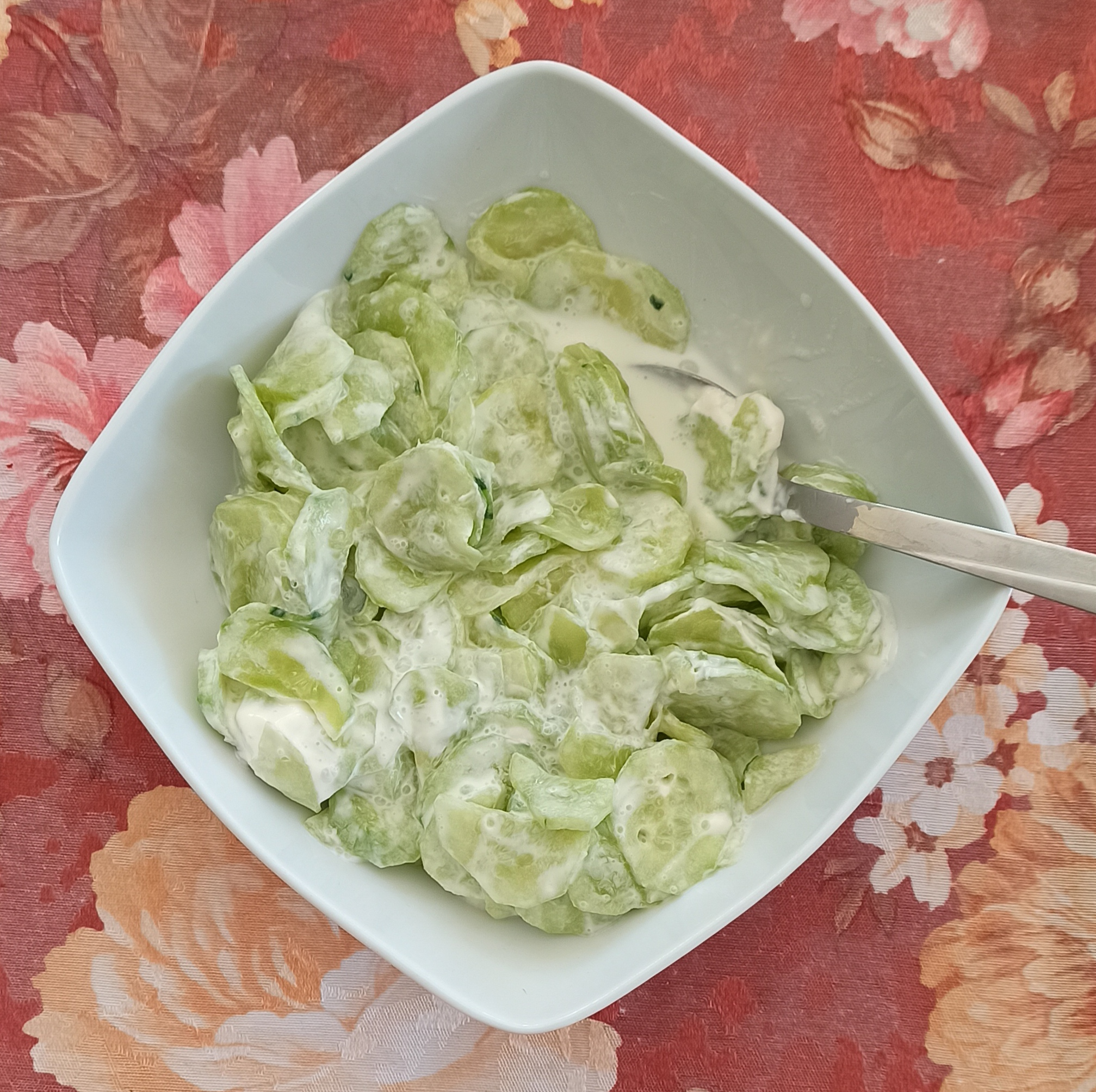
- Type: Salad
- Course: Side dish
- Place of origin: Poland
- Region or state: Poland and worldwide
- Main ingredients: Sour cream, cucumbers, Dill

Mizeria (Polish pronunciation: [miˈzɛ.rja]) is a salad which originated in Poland and consists of thinly sliced or grated cucumbers, often with sweet sour cream or kefir and vinegar, although in some cases oil. Other possible ingredients include onions, pepper or lemon juice, sugar, dill, chives, mint or parsley. The dish is usually served alongside a main course and is one of the most popular salads in Poland.

The name of the salad comes from the French word misère (poverty, squalor) and most likely expresses the disdainful attitude of the Polish aristocracy towards this traditional peasant dish.

Mizeria is also customarily made in the Hungarian-American community in Toledo, Ohio.

== See also ==
- List of salads
- Polish cuisine
- Tzatziki
