= Gourd =

Type of fruit

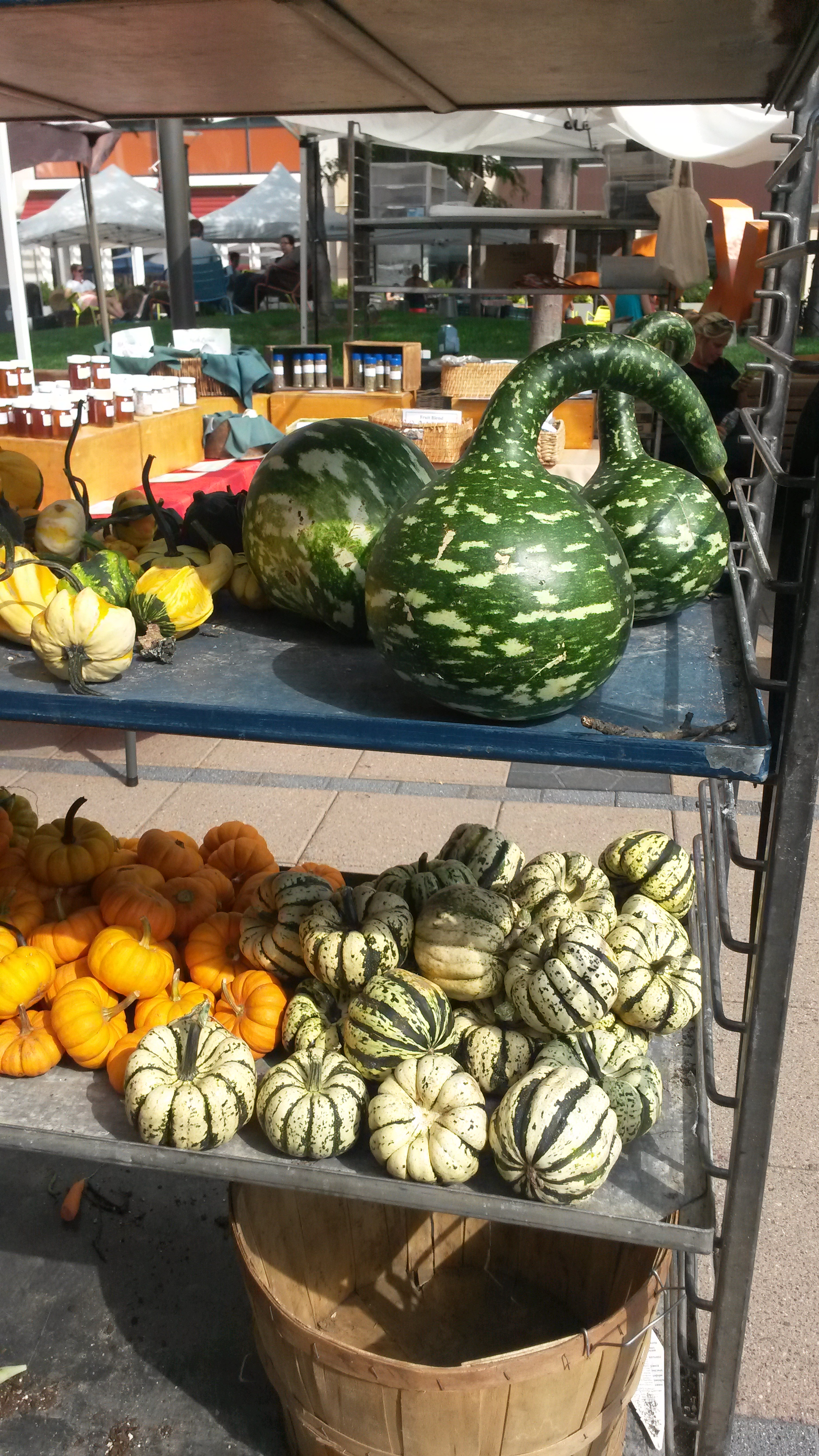
Gourds at a market in Massachusetts

Gourds include the fruits of some flowering plant species in the family Cucurbitaceae, particularly Cucurbita and Lagenaria. The term refers to a number of species and subspecies, many with hard shells, and some without. Many gourds have large, bulbous bodies and long necks, such as Dipper Gourds, many variations of Bottle Gourd and caveman club gourds. One of the earliest domesticated types of plants, subspecies of the bottle gourd, Lagenaria siceraria, have been discovered in archaeological sites dating from as early as 13,000 BC. Gourds have had numerous uses throughout history, including as tools, musical instruments, objects of art, film, and food.

== Terminology ==
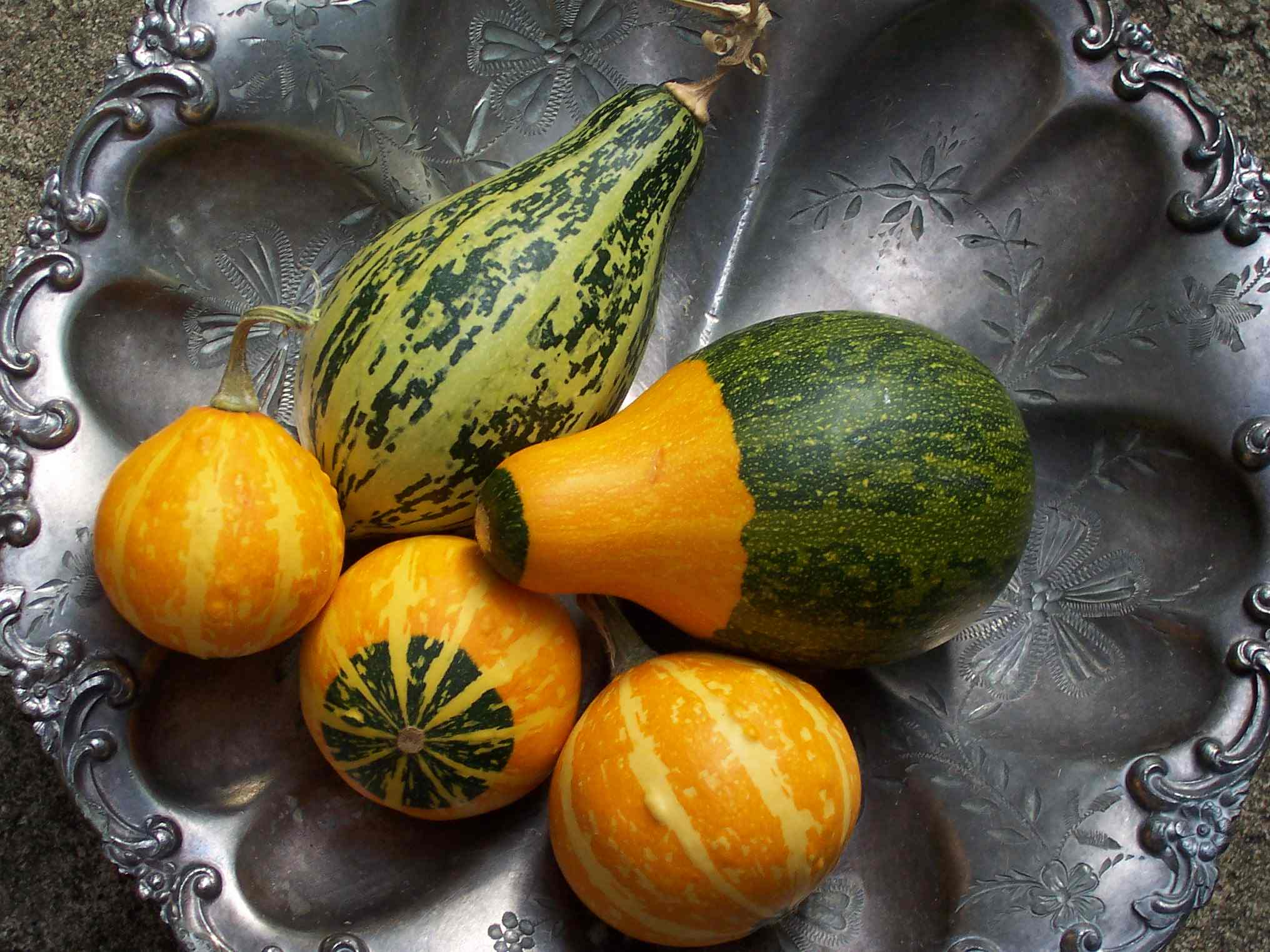
Cucurbita pepo gourds grown in a suburban garden in Australia

Gourd is occasionally used to describe crop plants in the family Cucurbitaceae, like pumpkins, cucumbers, zucchinis, squash, luffa, and melons. More specifically, gourd refers to the fruits of plants in the two Cucurbitaceae genera Lagenaria and Cucurbita, or also to their hollow, dried-out shell.

There are many different gourds worldwide. The main plants referred to as gourds include several species from the genus Cucurbita (mostly native to North America, including the Malabar gourd and turban squash), Crescentia cujete (the tree gourd or calabash tree, native to the American tropics) and Lagenaria siceraria (bottle gourd, thought to be originally from Africa but present worldwide). Other plants with gourd in their name include the luffa gourd (likely domesticated in Asia), which includes several species from the genus Luffa, as well as the wax gourd, snake gourd, teasel gourd, hedgehog gourd, buffalo gourd/coyote gourd. The bitter melon/balsam apple/balsam pear is also sometimes referred to as a gourd.

== History ==
L. siceraria, or bottle gourds, have been found in Peruvian archaeological sites dating from 13,000 to 11,000 BC and Thai archaeological sites from 11,000 to 6,000 BC. A study of bottle gourd DNA published in 2005 suggests that there are two distinct subspecies of bottle gourds, domesticated independently in Africa and Asia, the latter approximately 4,000 years earlier. The gourds found in the Americas appear to have come from the Asian subspecies very early in history, although a new study now indicates Africa. The archaeological and DNA records show it is likely that the gourd was among the first domesticated species, in Asia between 12,000 and 13,000 years before present, and possibly the first domesticated plant species.

Wild, poisonous gourds (Citrullus colocynthis) were unknowingly added to the company of prophets' stew according to a story of Elisha in the Hebrew Bible. Elisha added flour to the stew in order to purify it. This interpretation of the verse is disputed by Rashi's interpretation, who translates it as poisonous mushrooms, not poisonous gourds.

Gourds have continued to be used throughout history in almost every culture throughout the world. European contact in North America found extensive gourd use, including the use of bottle gourds as birdhouses to attract purple martins, which provided bug control for agriculture. Almost every culture had musical instruments made of gourds, including drums, stringed instruments common to Africa and wind instruments, including the nose flutes of the Pacific.

== Research ==
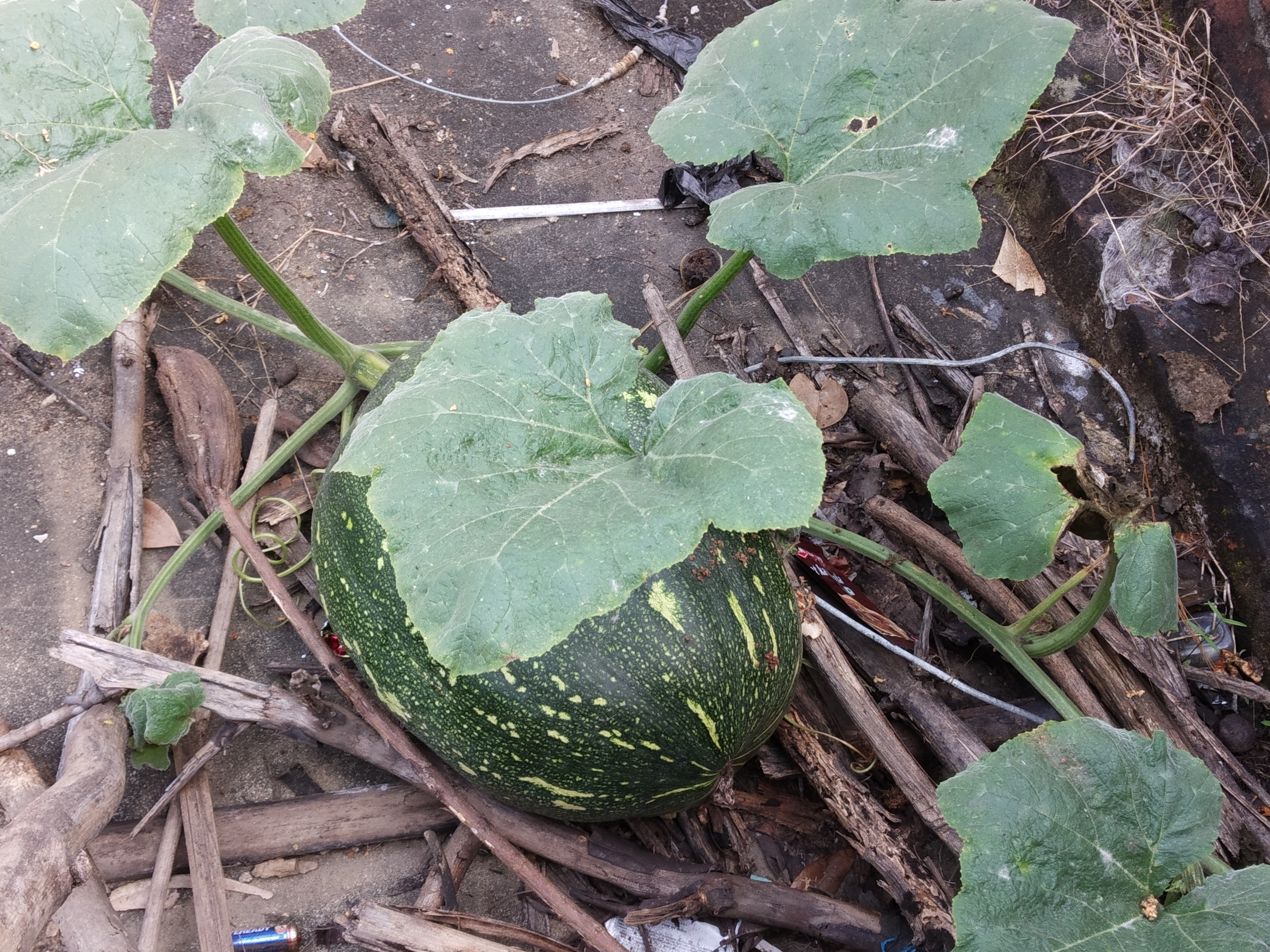
An Indian gourd

Scientists in India have been working on crossbreeding six members of the Momordica (bitter gourd) genus found in India to reduce the unpleasant taste while retaining the nutritional and medicinal values of the plants. These include Teasle gourd (Momordica dioica), Spine gourd (Momordica subangulata), Sweet gourd (Momordica cochinchinensis), balsam apple (Momordica balsamina) and Momordica sahyadrica.

== Uses ==
Cultures from arid regions often associate gourds with water, and they appear in many creation myths. Since before human written history, they have had a multitude of uses including food storage, cooking tools, toys, musical instruments and decoration. Today, gourds are commonly used for a wide variety of crafts, and are made into objects including jewelry, furniture, dishes, utensils, and decorations, using carving, burning, and other techniques.

Gourd carving is recognised as folk art in Peru and was declared part of the country's National Cultural Heritage in 2013.

Just one example of a musical instrument is the West African Balafon, a xylophone that has gourds attached to the bottom of each note for resonance.

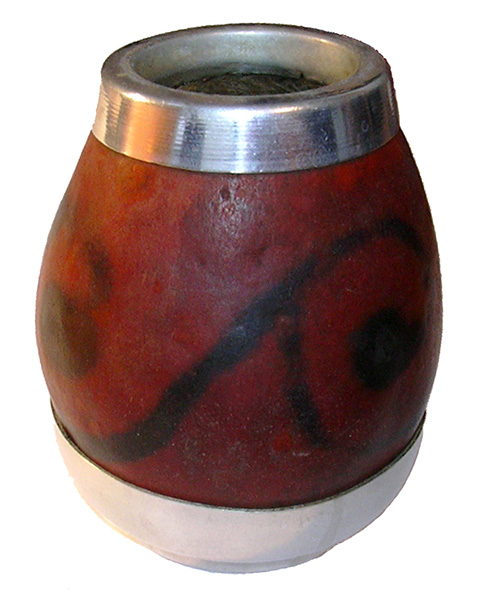
Calabash gourd, Lagenaria siceraria, used for drinking mate

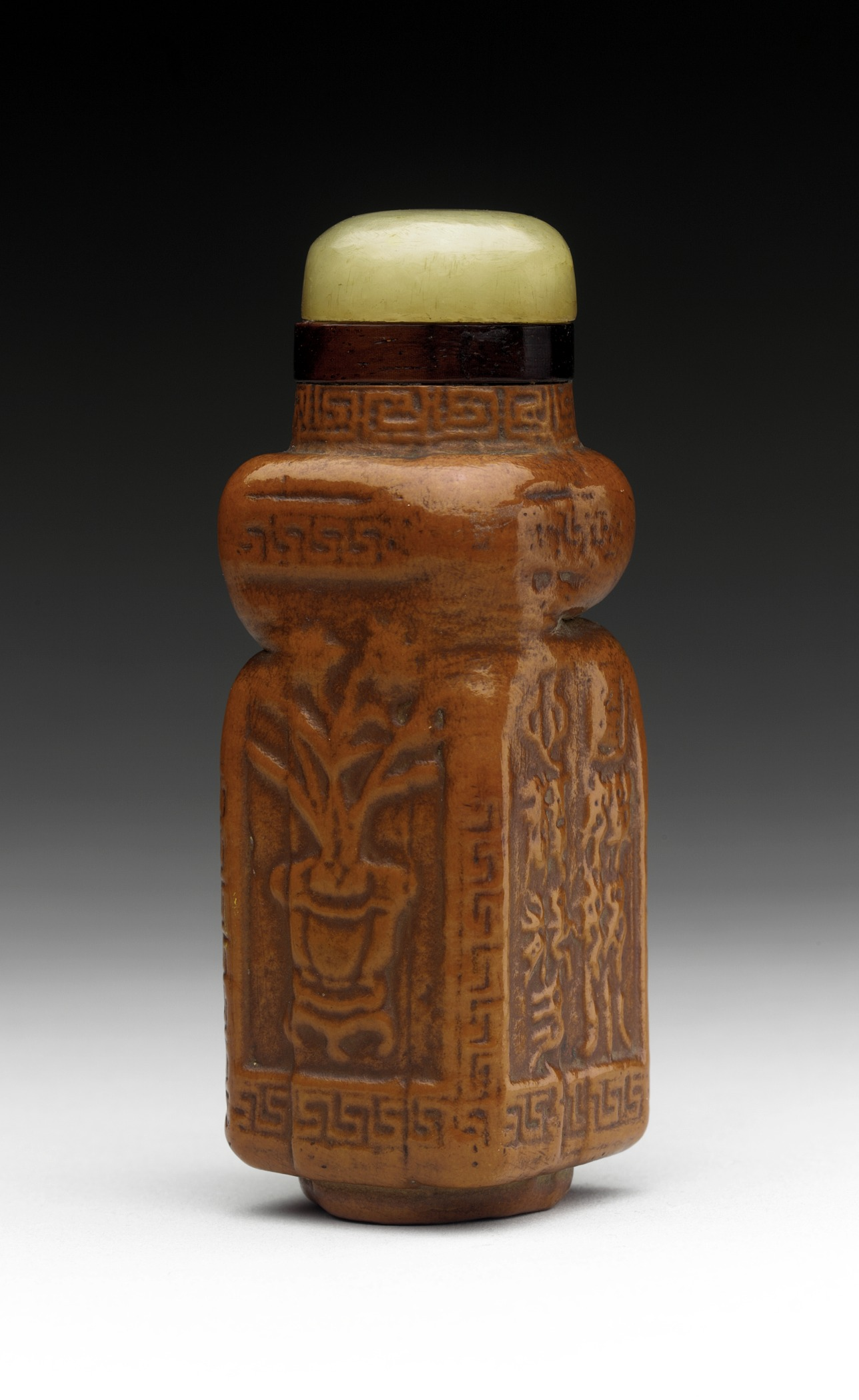
Chinese snuff bottle (biyanhu) with body from a gourd grown inside a mould, and a jade stopper

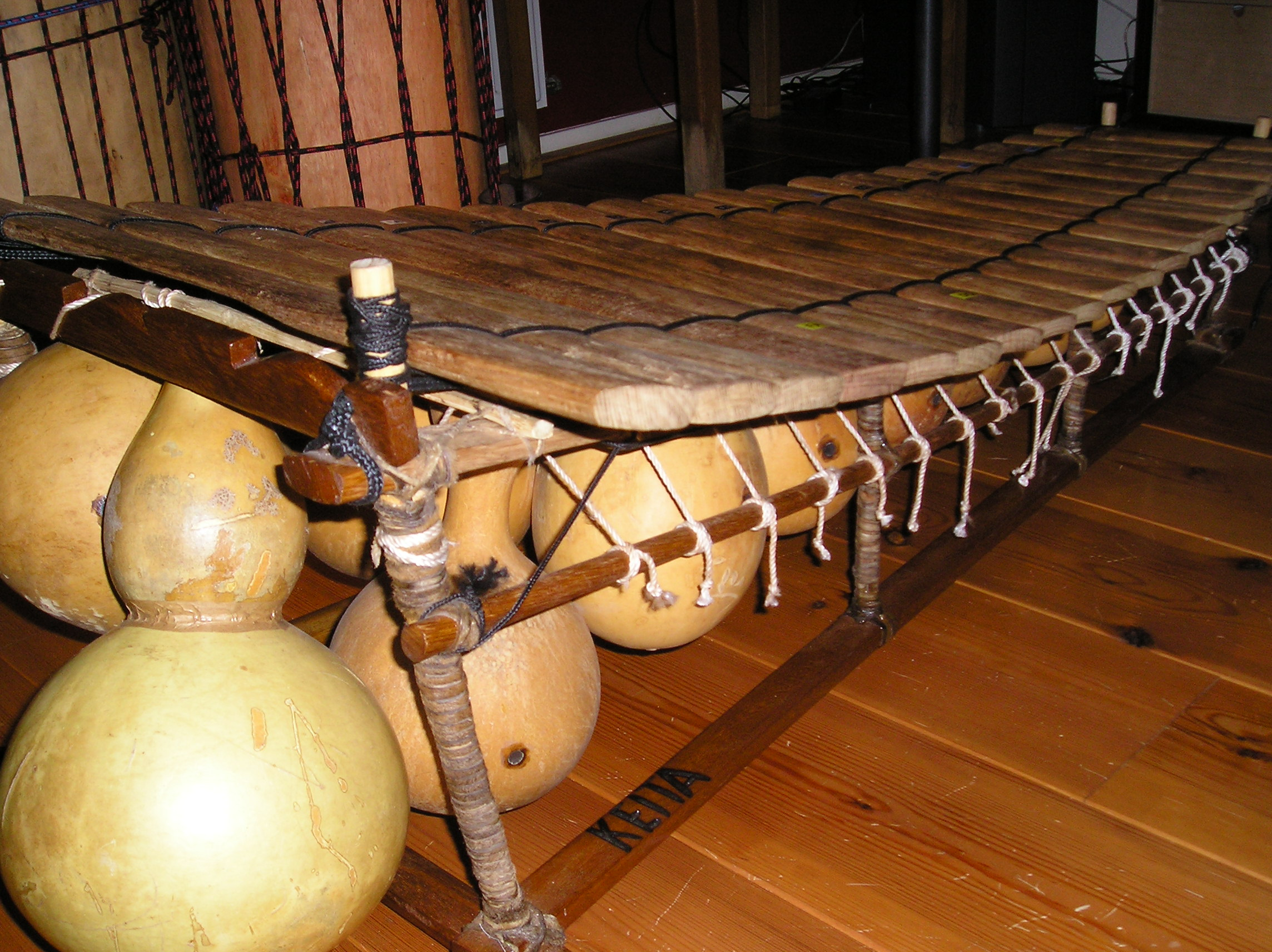
A fixed-key balafon, showing gourd resonators with membrane holes

== Religion and folklore ==
Gourds have maintained a prominent role in the religion and mythology of numerous cultures. In regard to Christianity, several artists such as Frans Floris and Carlo Crivelli have depicted the gourd as a symbol of the Resurrection of Christ, juxtaposed with the Fruit of Good and Evil that was consumed by Adam and Eve. In the Old Testament of the Christian Bible, a gourd tree was used to shield Jonah from intense weather conditions while he was surveying Nineveh. This terminology is contested by the New King James Version, which simply uses the term plant. In Catholicism, the calabash and rod that pilgrims on the Camino de Santiago adorn have become synonymous with the image of Raphael (archangel). The gourd plant is also mentioned in the Quran, the holy book in Islam, in regards to the story of Jonah.

Asides from religion, the gourd also makes frequent appearances in Chinese mythology. The Chinese god of longevity Shouxing is often depicted carrying a staff with a gourd attached to its end. Li Tieguai, one of the Eight Immortals is also often depicted with a bottle gourd that contains a special medicine that he uses to aid the sick, poor, or needy. These depictions denote the fruit's significance as a symbol of longevity and the power of medicine within Chinese culture.

== See also ==
- A güiro is a Latin American percussion instrument made from a gourd.
- Maracas are percussion instruments often made from gourds.
- A sitar and veena are plucked stringed instruments, parts of which are made from gourds.
- African percussion instruments are made incorporating gourds, including the shekere, axatse, balafon, and caxixi.
- Salakot, a traditional headgear of the Philippines which can be made from the bottle gourd
- Kashaka, a West African percussion instrument made from two gourds filled with beans.

== General bibliography ==
- Egorova, I. V.; Zhidkov, V. V.; Grinishak, I. P.; Bagryanskaya, I. Yu.; Pervukhina, N. V.; El'tsov, I. V.; Kurat'eva, N. V. (January 2019). "Antimony Complexes {[2,6−(OMe)_{2}C_{6}H_{3}]^{3}SbCH_{2}C(O)OEt}^{+}_{2}[Hg_{2}I_{6}]^{2−}and {[2,6−(OMe)_{2}C_{6}H_{3}]_{3}SBME}^{+}_{2}[HgI_{4}]^{2−}⋅DMSO: Synthesis and Structure". Russian Journal of Inorganic Chemistry. 64 (1): 28–35. doi:10.1134/s0036023619010078. ISSN 0036-0236. S2CID 199447333.
