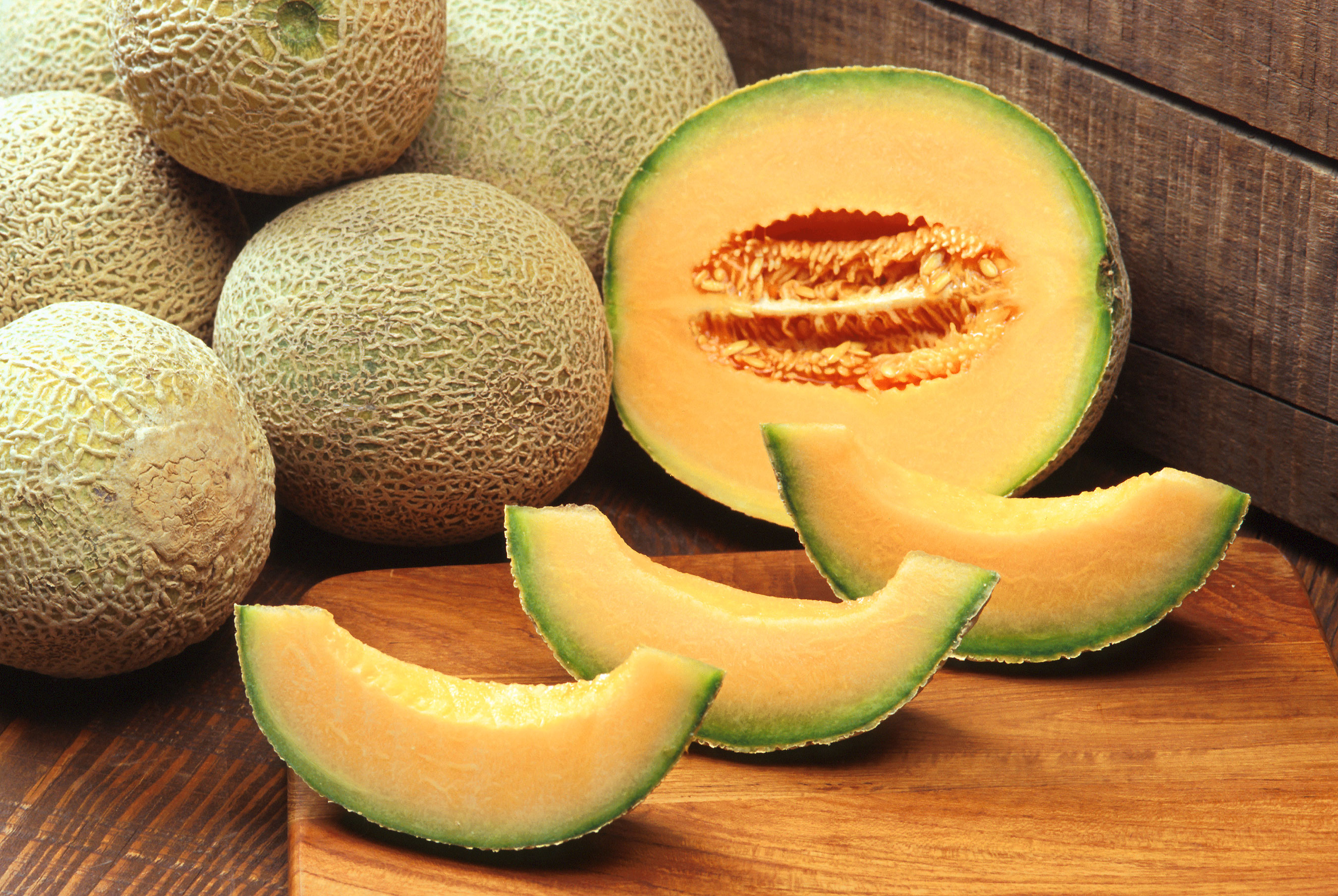
- Cantaloupe melon

Scientific classification
- Kingdom: Plantae
- Clade: Tracheophytes
- Clade: Angiosperms
- Clade: Eudicots
- Clade: Rosids
- Order: Cucurbitales
- Family: Cucurbitaceae
- Subfamily: Cucurbitoideae
- Tribe: Benincaseae
- Genus: Cucumis; L.

Species
- See text.

Synonyms
- Cucumella Chiov.; Dicaelosperma E.G.O.Müll. & Pax, orth. var.; Dicaelospermum C.B.Clarke, orth. var.; Dicoelospermum C.B.Clarke; Hymenosicyos Chiov.; Melo Mill.; Mukia Arn.; Myrmecosicyos C.Jeffrey; Oreosyce Hook.f.

= Cucumis =

Genus of flowering plants

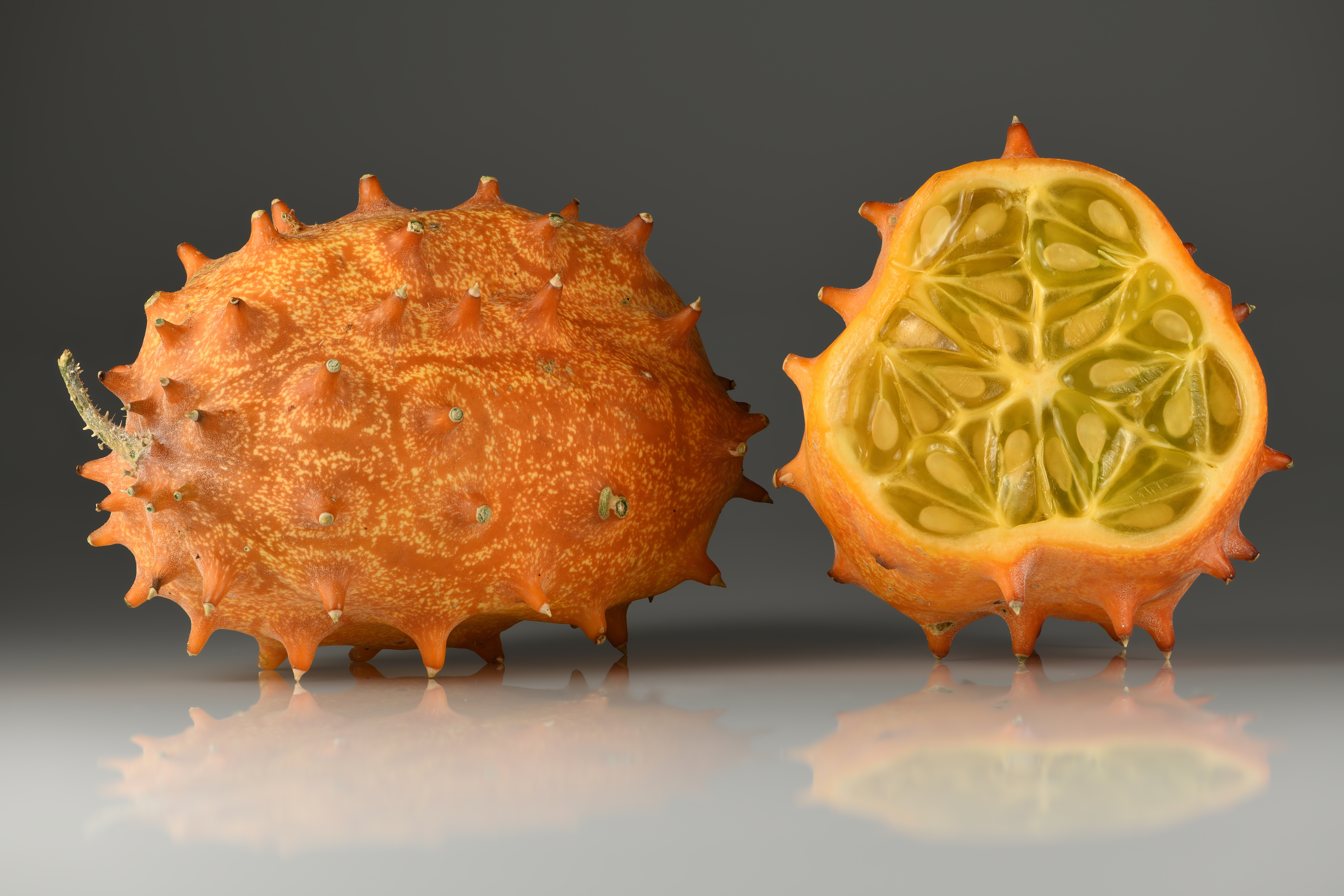
Horned melon (Cucumis metuliferus)

Cucumis is a genus of twining, tendril-bearing plants in the family Cucurbitaceae which includes the cucumber (Cucumis sativus), true melons (Cucumis melo, including cantaloupe and honeydew), the horned melon (Cucumis metuliferus), and the West Indian gherkin (Cucumis anguria).

30 species occur in Africa, and 25 occur in India, Southeast Asia, and Australia. However, Cucumis myriocarpus was introduced to Australia from Sub-Saharan Africa, and is regarded as an invasive species.

== Species ==
As of October 2022, Plants of the World Online accepted 61 species:

- Cucumis aculeatus Cogn.
- Cucumis aetheocarpus (C.Jeffrey) Ghebret. & Thulin
- Cucumis africanus L.f.
- Cucumis althaeoides (Ser.) P.Sebastian & I.Telford
- Cucumis anguria L.
- Cucumis argenteus (Domin) P.Sebastian & I.Telford
- Cucumis asper Cogn.
- Cucumis baladensis Thulin
- Cucumis bryoniifolius (Merxm.) Ghebret. & Thulin
- Cucumis canoxyi Thulin & Al-Gifri
- Cucumis carolinus J.H.Kirkbr.
- Cucumis cinereus (Cogn.) Ghebret. & Thulin
- Cucumis clavipetiolatus (J.H.Kirkbr.) Ghebret. & Thulin
- Cucumis costatus I.Telford
- Cucumis debilis W.J.de Wilde & Duyfjes
- Cucumis dipsaceus Ehrenb. ex Spach
- Cucumis engleri (Gilg) Ghebret. & Thulin
- Cucumis ficifolius A.Rich.
- Cucumis globosus C.Jeffrey
- Cucumis gracilis (Kurz) Ghebret. & Thulin
- Cucumis hastatus Thulin
- Cucumis heptadactylus Naudin
- Cucumis hirsutus Sond.
- Cucumis humifructus Stent (as Cucumis humofructus)
- Cucumis hystrix Chakrav.
- Cucumis indicus Ghebret. & Thulin
- Cucumis insignis C.Jeffrey
- Cucumis javanicus (Miq.) Ghebret. & Thulin
- Cucumis jeffreyanus Thulin
- Cucumis kalahariensis A.Meeuse
- Cucumis kelleri (Cogn.) Ghebret. & Thulin
- Cucumis kirkbridei Ghebret. & Thulin
- Cucumis leiospermus (Wight & Arn.) Ghebret. & Thulin
- Cucumis maderaspatanus L.
- Cucumis meeusei C.Jeffrey
- Cucumis melo L.
- Cucumis messorius (C.Jeffrey) Ghebret. & Thulin
- Cucumis metuliferus E.Mey. ex Naudin
- Cucumis myriocarpus Naudin
- Cucumis omissus Thulin
- Cucumis picrocarpus F.Muell.
- Cucumis prophetarum L.
- Cucumis pubituberculatus Thulin
- Cucumis pustulatus Naudin ex Hook.f.
- Cucumis queenslandicus I.Telford
- Cucumis quintanilhae R.Fern. & A.Fern.
- Cucumis reticulatus (A.Fern. & R.Fern.) Ghebret. & Thulin
- Cucumis rigidus E.Mey. ex Sond.
- Cucumis ritchiei (C.B.Clarke) Ghebret. & Thulin
- Cucumis rostratus J.H.Kirkbr.
- Cucumis rumphianus (Scheff.) H.Schaef.
- Cucumis sacleuxii Paill. & Bois
- Cucumis sagittatus Wawra & Peyr.
- Cucumis sativus L., cucumber
- Cucumis setosus Cogn.
- Cucumis silentvalleyi (Manilal, T.Sabu & P.Mathew) Ghebret. & Thulin
- Cucumis thulinianus J.H.Kirkbr.
- Cucumis umbellatus I.Telford
- Cucumis variabilis P.Sebastian & I.Telford
- Cucumis zambianus Widrl., J.H.Kirkbr., Ghebret. & K.R.Reitsma
- Cucumis zeyheri Sond.

== See also ==
- Bailan melon
- Galia melon
- Gaya melon
- Hami melon
- Korean melon
- Santa Claus melon
- Sugar melon
- Winter melon
