= Gooseberry gourd =

Gooseberry gourd may refer to one of at least two plant species:

- Cucumis anguria
- Cucumis myriocarpus, native to tropical and southern Africa
