= Cucumis picrocarpus =

Scientific classification
- Kingdom: Plantae
- Clade: Tracheophytes
- Clade: Angiosperms
- Clade: Eudicots
- Clade: Rosids
- Order: Cucurbitales
- Family: Cucurbitaceae
- Genus: Cucumis
- Species: C. picrocarpus

Binomial name
- Cucumis picrocarpus F.Muell.

Species of flowering plant

Cucumis picrocarpus is a vine in the family Cucurbitaceae that is native to Western Australia through parts of the Pilbara and Kimberley regions.
