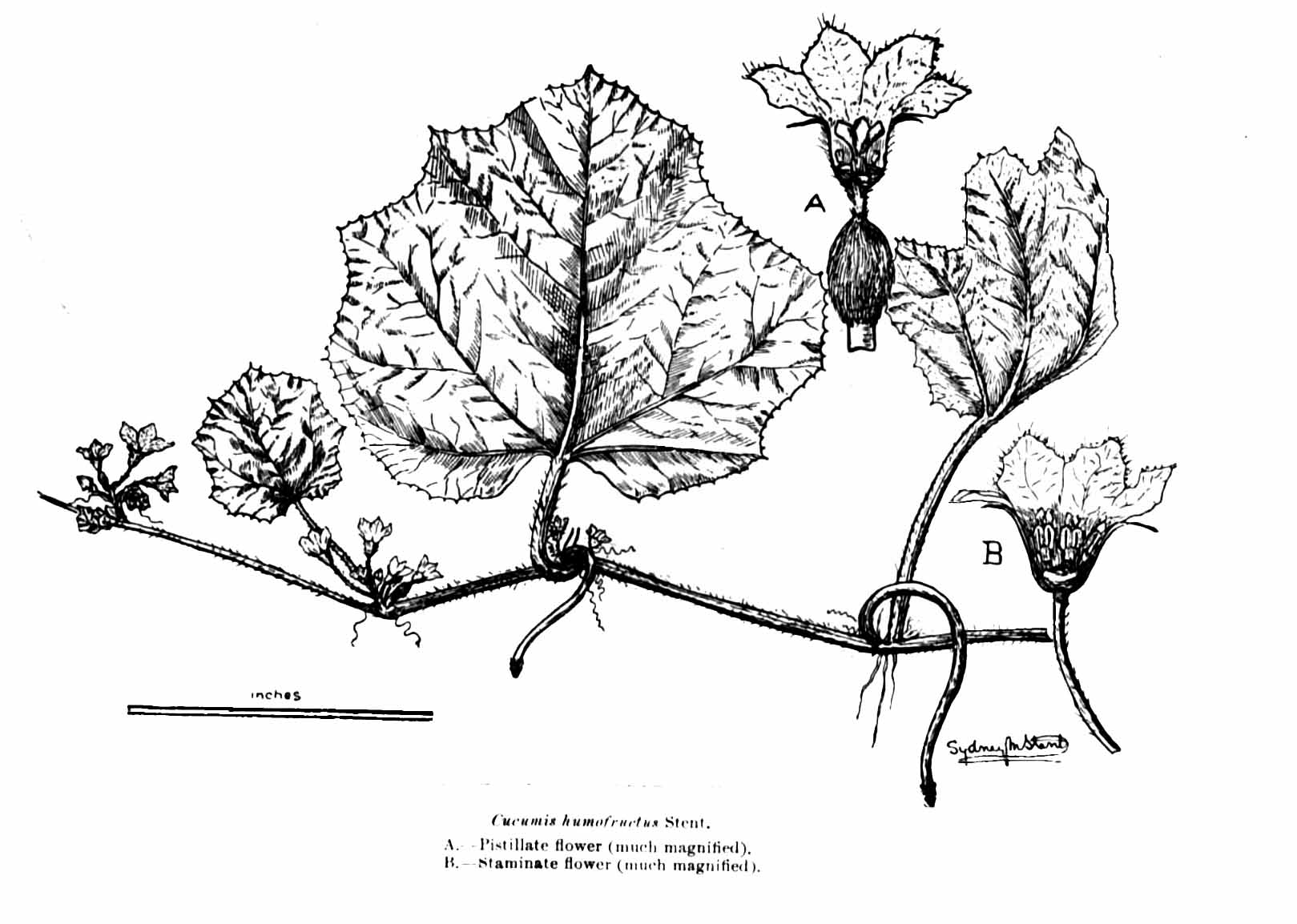

Scientific classification
- Kingdom: Plantae
- Clade: Tracheophytes
- Clade: Angiosperms
- Clade: Eudicots
- Clade: Rosids
- Order: Cucurbitales
- Family: Cucurbitaceae
- Genus: Cucumis
- Species: C. humifructus

Binomial name
- Cucumis humifructus Stent

= Cucumis humifructus =

Aardvark cucumber

Species of flowering plant

Cucumis humifructus, the aardvark cucumber or aardvark pumpkin, is a species of cucumber (family Cucurbitaceae) from southern and tropical Africa which fruits underground. It is a prostrate vine up to 7 metres (23 ft) in length. It is reliant on the aardvark (Orycteropus afer) to eat the fruit in order to spread and re-bury its seeds. The species was described in 1927, with the name spelling "humofructus", but this is corrected to C. humifructus following the International Code of Nomenclature for algae, fungi, and plants.

== Description ==
Cucumis humifructus is thought to be the only Cucumis species having geocarpic (subterranean) fruit. The vines of the plant initially develop their fruit above ground on stalks which then bend and push back under the ground. The fruit then grows at a depth of between 30–90 cm (1–3 ft). Most cucurbits have a single tendril at each node, but C. humifructus has 2 to 8, to give it the leverage needed to bury the young fruit. It develops a tough skin which is water-resistant, and can remain intact for months without decay. The plant grows as a trailing herb from 2–7 metres (7–23 ft) in tropical Africa and 0.5–2.5 metres (2–8 ft) in southern Africa.

It is the only fruit (and only form of plant matter) eaten by aardvarks, which otherwise feed exclusively on ants and termites. Aardvarks eat the fruit for its water content, and propagate the seeds through their faeces, which are then buried by the animals. Due to the depth at which the fruit ripen, the seeds are unable to germinate without assistance, and C. humifructus is completely reliant on aardvarks to uncover their fruit. This plant may be the reason why the aardvark is the only mammal feeding on ants and termites that has retained functional cheek teeth.

== Distribution and habitat ==
It has a growing season of between three and four months, with its habitat being restricted to the savanna regions of tropical and southern Africa. It typically grows within the geographical range of aardvark burrows, as the animals tend to defecate near their lairs.

== Gallery ==
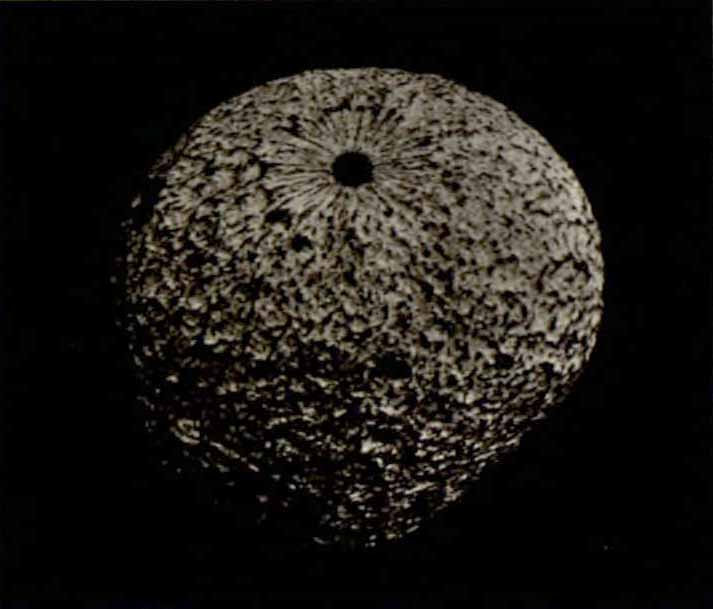
Fruit

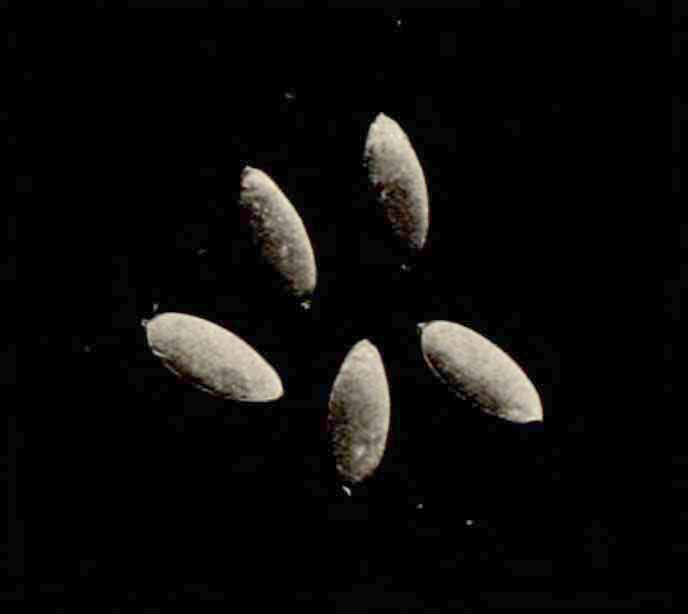
Seeds
