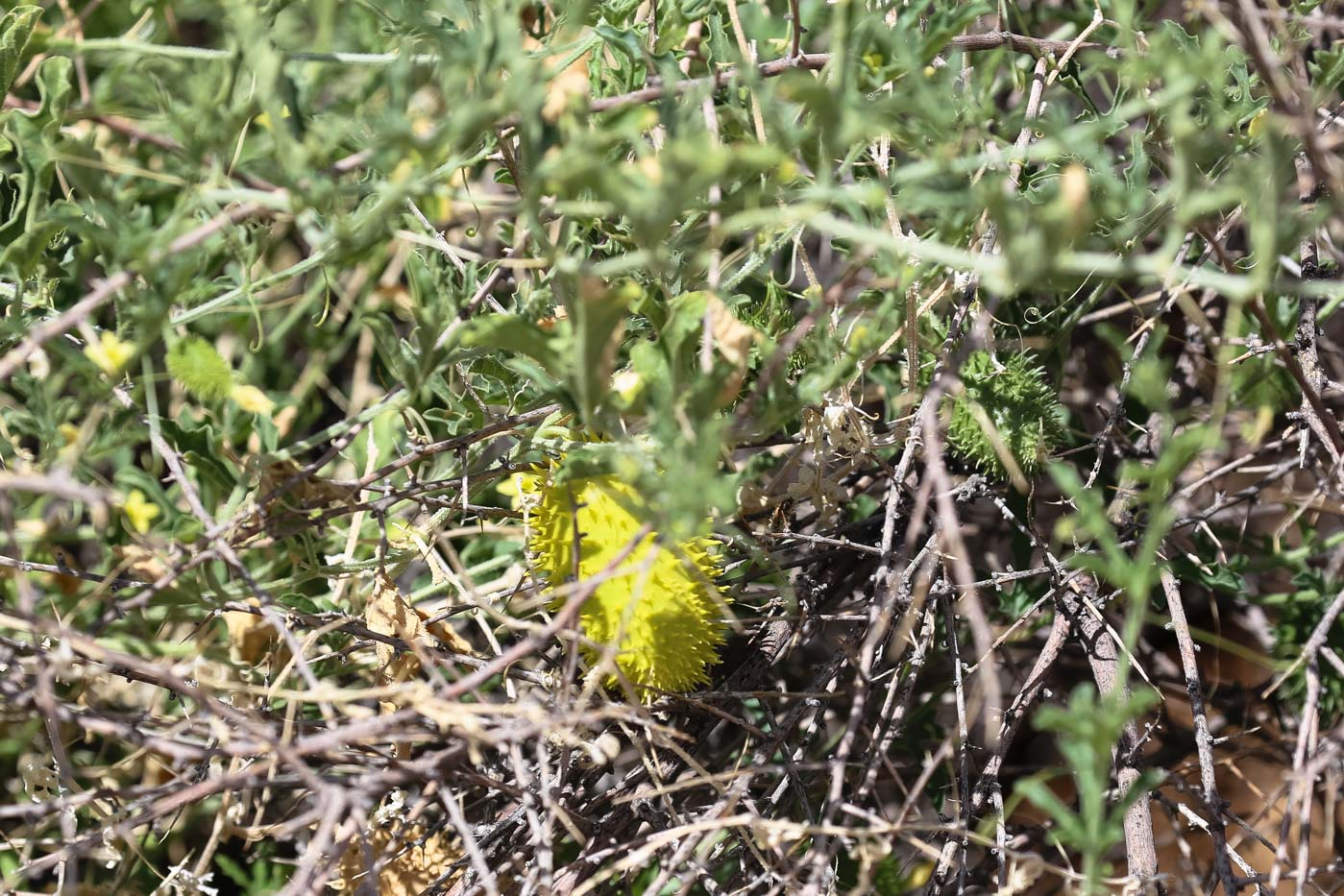

Scientific classification
- Kingdom: Plantae
- Clade: Tracheophytes
- Clade: Angiosperms
- Clade: Eudicots
- Clade: Rosids
- Order: Cucurbitales
- Family: Cucurbitaceae
- Genus: Cucumis
- Species: C. africanus

Binomial name
- Cucumis africanus L. fil., 1782

Synonyms
- Cucumis arenarius Schrad. Cucumis hookeri Naud.

= Cucumis africanus =

Species of flowering plant

Cucumis africanus, the wild cucumber or wild gherkin, is a species of cucumber belonging to the genus Cucumis. It was first described by Carl Linnaeus the Younger. The species is native to Southern Africa.
