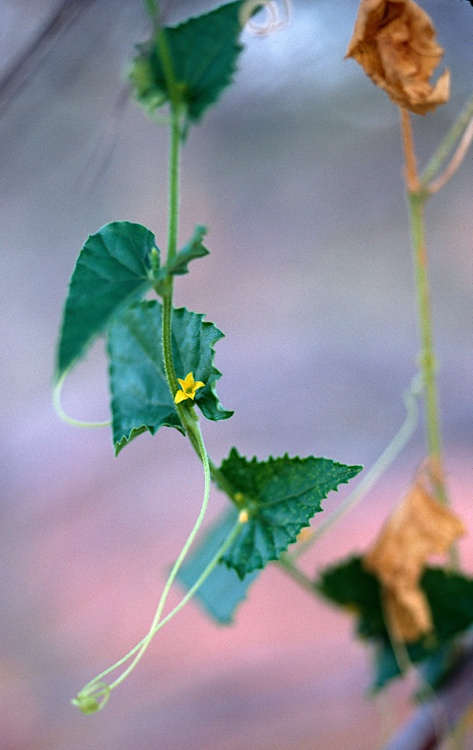

Scientific classification
- Kingdom: Plantae
- Clade: Tracheophytes
- Clade: Angiosperms
- Clade: Eudicots
- Clade: Rosids
- Order: Cucurbitales
- Family: Cucurbitaceae
- Genus: Cucumis
- Species: C. argenteus

Binomial name
- Cucumis argenteus (Domin) P.Sebastian & I.Telford

= Cucumis argenteus =

Snake vine

Species of flowering plant

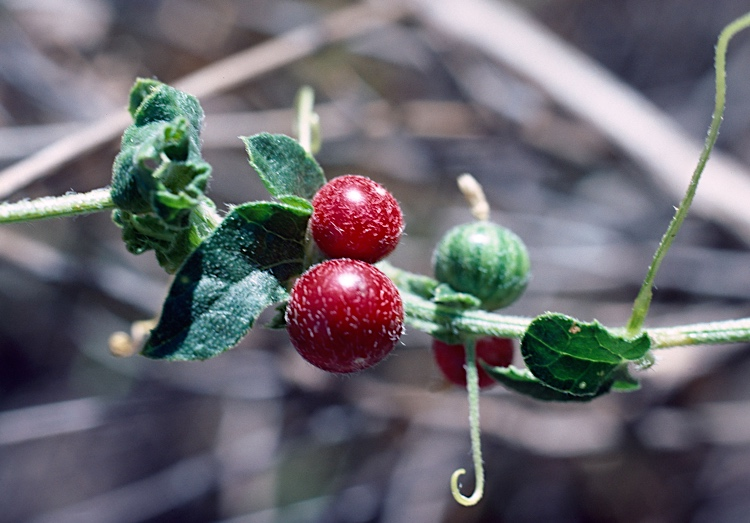
Fruit

Cucumis argenteus commonly known as snake vine, is a flowering vine in the family Cucurbitaceae. It has yellow flowers, red berries, variable leaves and grows in Western Australia, Queensland, South Australia and the Northern Territory.

== Description ==
Cucumis argenteus is a scrambling or climbing perennial with tendrils that climb on nearby plants, leaves are almost triangular to egg-shaped, occasionally lobed, 2–11 cm (0.79–4.33 in) long, 1–11 cm (0.39–4.33 in) wide and a rough surface. The yellow flowers are borne in leaf axils on a short pedicel. Flowering occurs in summer and the fruit is a red berry 5–12 mm (0.20–0.47 in) wide.

== Taxonomy and naming ==
This species was described in 1929 by Karel Domin who named it Melothria argentea.In 2011 Ian Telford and Patrizia Sebastian changed the name to Cucumis argenteus and the change was published in Systematic Botany. The specific epithet (argenteus) means "silvery".

== Distribution and habitat ==
Snake vine grows near sand dunes and sometimes in wet culverts near roadsides in Western Australia, Queensland, South Australia and the Northern Territory.
