= Gaya melon =

Melon cultivar

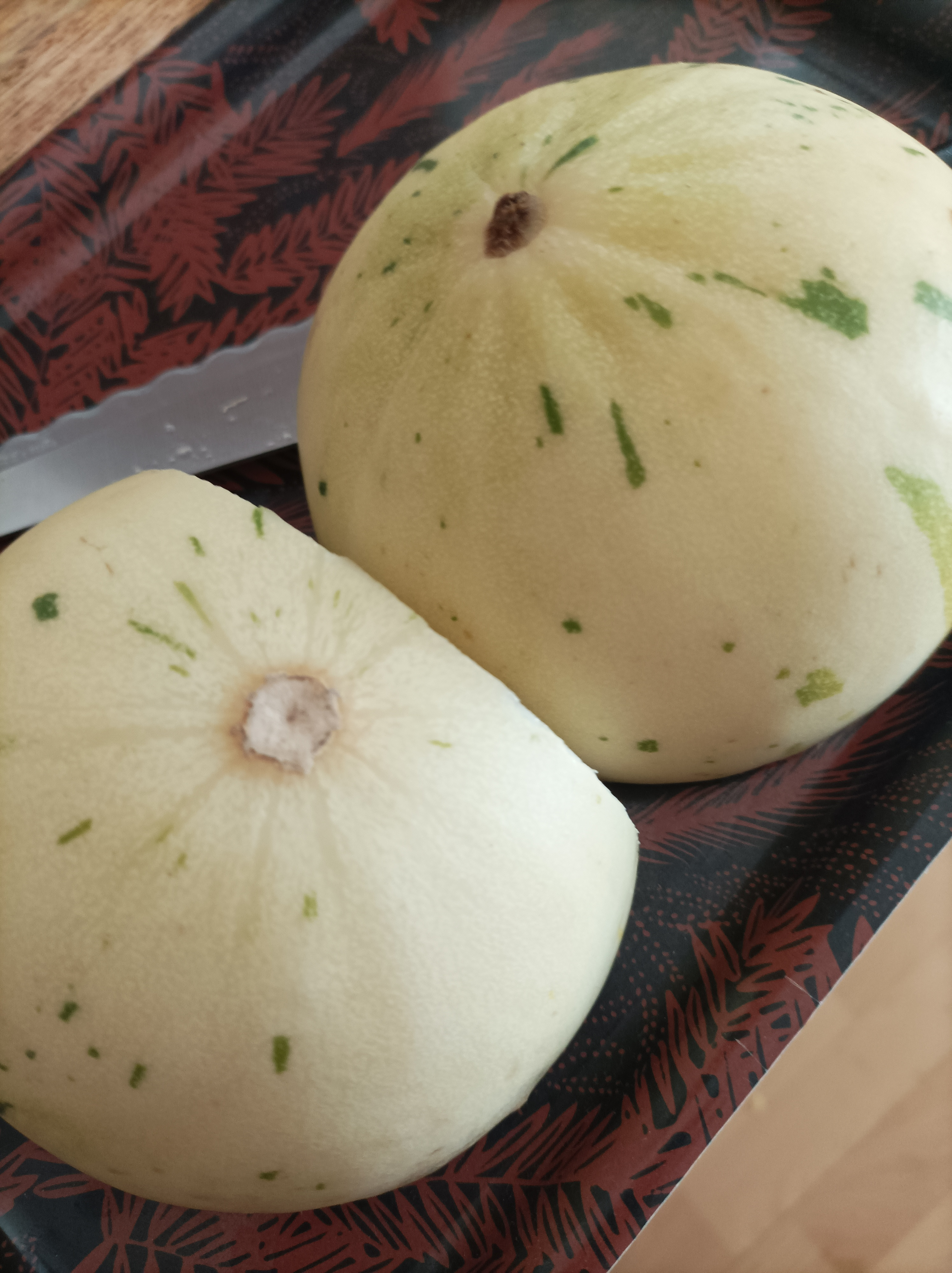
- Genus: Cucumis
- Species: Cucumis melo
- Cultivar: 'Gaya'
- Origin: Japan Korea

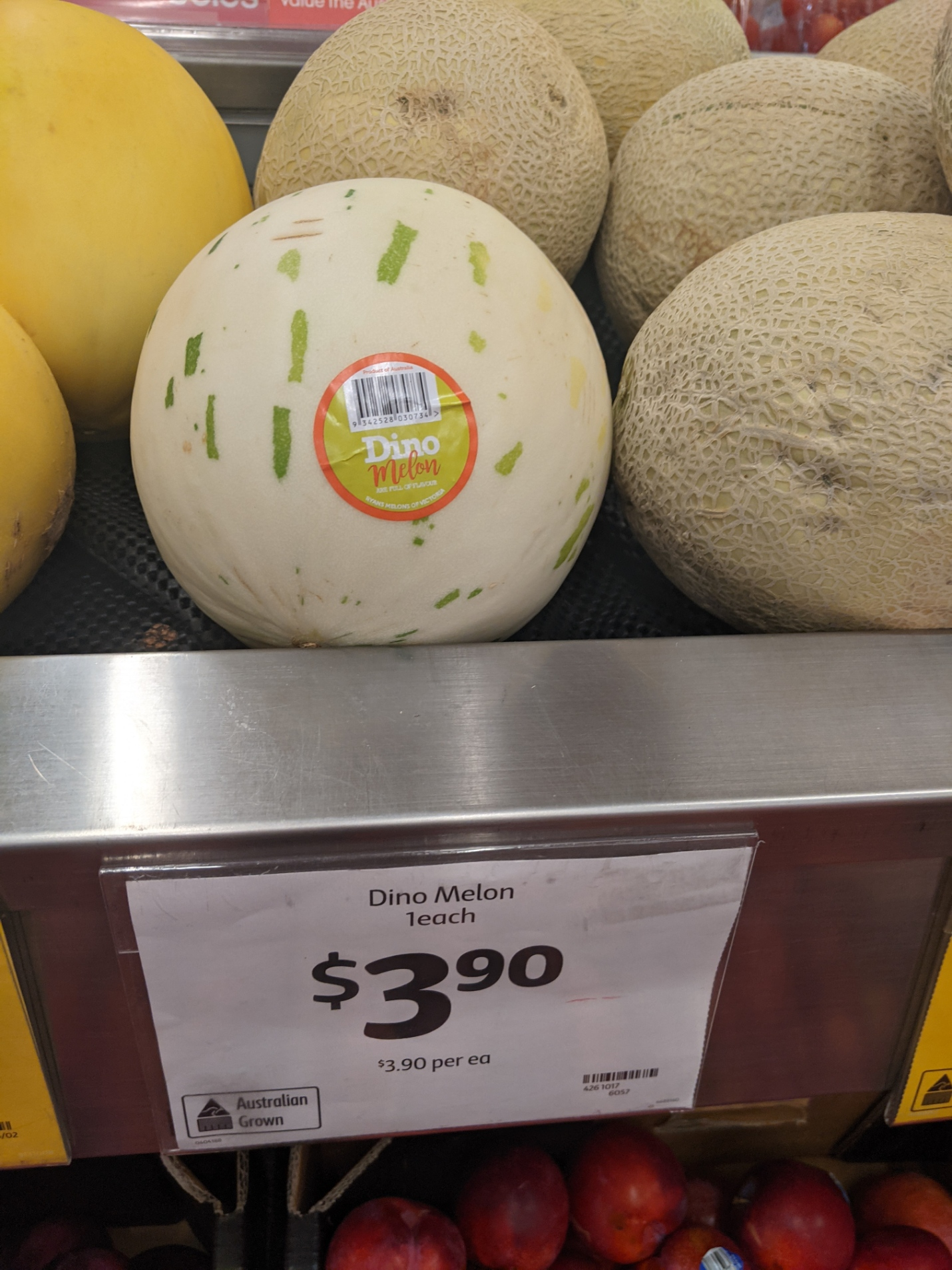
Dino melon at Coles Supermarket, Adelaide, Australia

The Gaya melon, also known as the ivory gaya, snowball, sweet snowball, ghost, dino(saur), dino(saur) egg, snow leopard, matice, matisse, sugar baby, and silver star melons, is a small to big-sized honeydew cultivar developed originally in Japan and Korea and now grown in China, Mexico, southern California, and South America.

== Description ==
The rind is very thin and is ivory in color with green streaking and the interior flesh is white. They are round in shape and may be slightly oblong. The flesh is juicy and soft towards the center but crispier towards the rind. It has been described to have a mild, sweet flavor with floral notes. It is best kept at room temperature and cut melons will stay good in a refrigerator for up to 5 days.

== Availability ==
It is available from late spring to early summer and is available at various farmers' markets and Asian markets in California and is sought after because of its unique coloring. It is also available at supermarkets in Australia, among other countries.

== See also ==
- Melon
