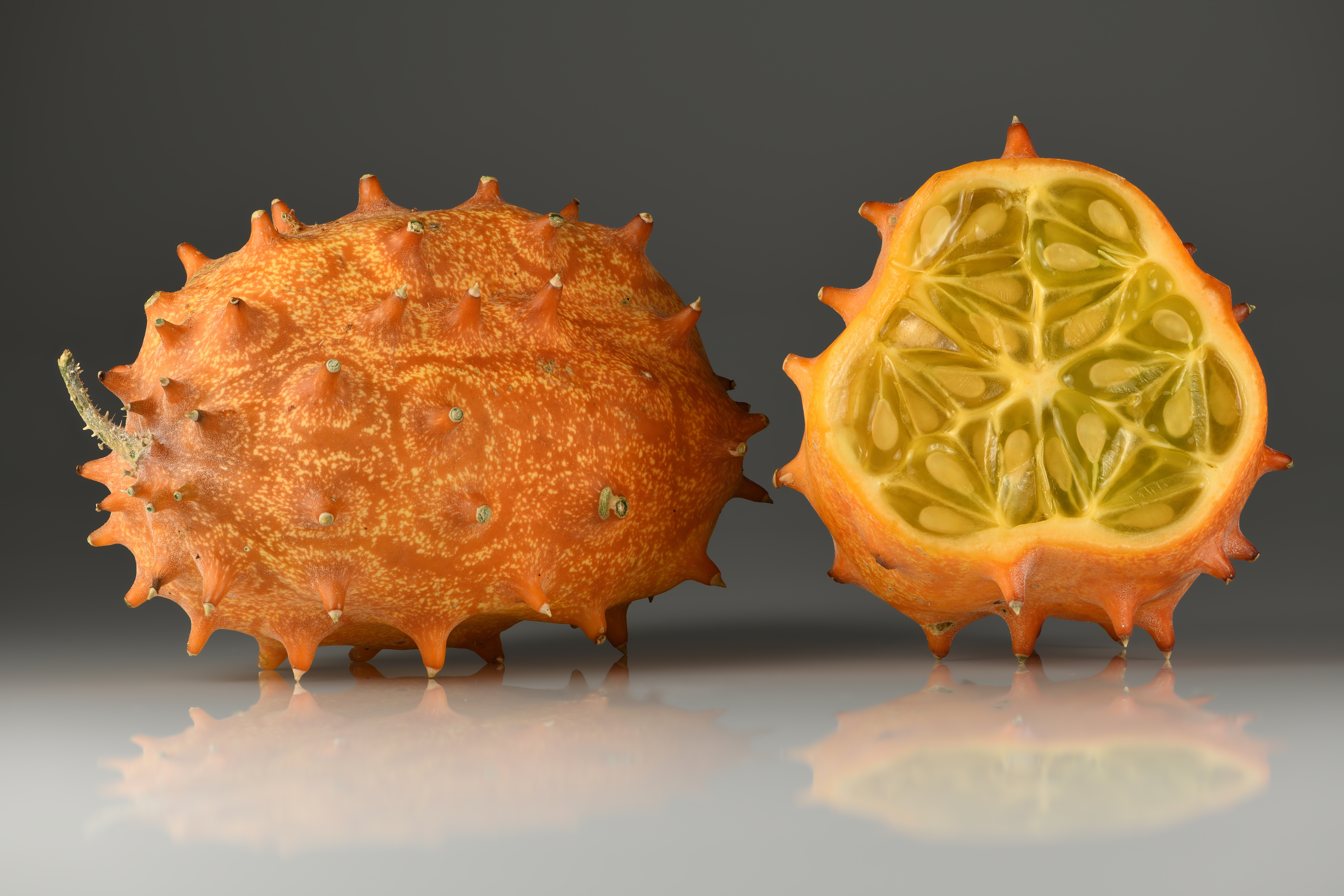
- Fruits

Scientific classification
- Kingdom: Plantae
- Clade: Tracheophytes
- Clade: Angiosperms
- Clade: Eudicots
- Clade: Rosids
- Order: Cucurbitales
- Family: Cucurbitaceae
- Genus: Cucumis
- Species: C. metuliferus

Binomial name
- Cucumis metuliferus Jacques

Synonyms
- Cucumis tinneanus Kotschy & Peyr.

= Cucumis metuliferus =

Horned melon

Vine in the cucumber and melon family

Horned Melon, raw
Nutritional value per 100 g (3.5 oz)
- Energy: 183 kJ (44 kcal)
- Carbohydrates: 7.56 g
- Fat: 1.26 g
- Protein: 1.78 g
Vitamins and minerals
Vitamins	Quantity %DV^{†}
Vitamin A equiv. beta-Carotene	1% 7 μg 1% 88 μg
Thiamine (B1)	2% 0.025 mg
Riboflavin (B2)	1% 0.015 mg
Niacin (B3)	4% 0.565 mg
Pantothenic acid (B5)	4% 0.183 mg
Vitamin B6	4% 0.063 mg
Folate (B9)	1% 3 μg
Vitamin C	6% 5.3 mg
Minerals	Quantity %DV^{†}
Calcium	1% 13 mg
Copper	2% 0.020 mg
Iron	6% 1.13 mg
Magnesium	10% 40 mg
Manganese	2% 0.039 mg
Phosphorus	3% 37 mg
Potassium	4% 123 mg
Sodium	0% 2 mg
Zinc	4% 0.48 mg
- Other constituents: Quantity
- Water: 88.97 g
- Link to USDA Database entry
- ^{†}Percentages estimated using US recommendations for adults, except for potassium, which is estimated based on expert recommendation from the National Academies.

Cucumis metuliferus, also known as the African horned cucumber (shortened to horned cucumber), horned melon, spiked melon, jelly melon, or kiwano, is an annual vine in the cucumber and melon family Cucurbitaceae. Its fruit has horn-like spines, hence the name "horned melon". The ripe fruit has orange skin and lime-green, soft flesh. Cucumis metuliferus is native to Southern Africa, in South Africa, Namibia, Botswana, Zambia, Malawi, Zimbabwe, Mozambique, and Angola.

== Consumption and other uses ==
Kiwano is a traditional food plant in Africa. Along with the gemsbok cucumber (Acanthosicyos naudinianus) and tsamma (Citrullus amarus), it is one of the few sources of water during the dry season in the Kalahari Desert. In northern Zimbabwe, it is called gaka or gakachika, and is primarily used as a snack or salad, and rarely for decoration. It can be eaten at any stage of ripening.

C. metuliferus may be used as a rootstock (via grafting) for melon to prevent both growth reduction and a strong nematode buildup in M. incognita-infested soil.

The fruit's taste has been compared to a combination of banana and passionfruit, cucumber and zucchini or a combination of banana, cucumber and lime.

Some also eat the peel, which is very rich in vitamin C and dietary fiber.

== Germination ==
Germination is optimal between 20–35 °C (68–95 °F); is delayed at 12 °C (54 °F) and seed stratification is totally inhibited; and is greatly inhibited above 35 °C (95 °F). Salinity increases the time required for full germination. The sowing dates greatly influence fruit yield and flowering.

== Pests and diseases ==
Kiwano is resistant to several root-knot nematodes; two accessions were found to be highly resistant to watermelon mosaic virus, but very sensitive to the squash mosaic virus. Some accessions were found to succumb to Fusarium wilt. Resistance to greenhouse whitefly was reported. Kiwano was reported to be resistant to powdery mildew, but in Israel, powdery mildew and squash mosaic virus attacked kiwano fields and control measures had to be taken.

== Fruit development ==
During 28 days of development on the plant, fresh weight, electrical conductivity and titratable acidity of fruits do not change, pH rises and then falls, and concentrations of reducing sugars and total soluble solids increase. In the same period, peel colour changes from green through whitish green to yellow and finally to orange, and the pigment profile shows a decline in pigments absorbing at 431 and 663 nm, and a rapid increase in those absorbing at 442 and 470 nm.

== Gallery ==
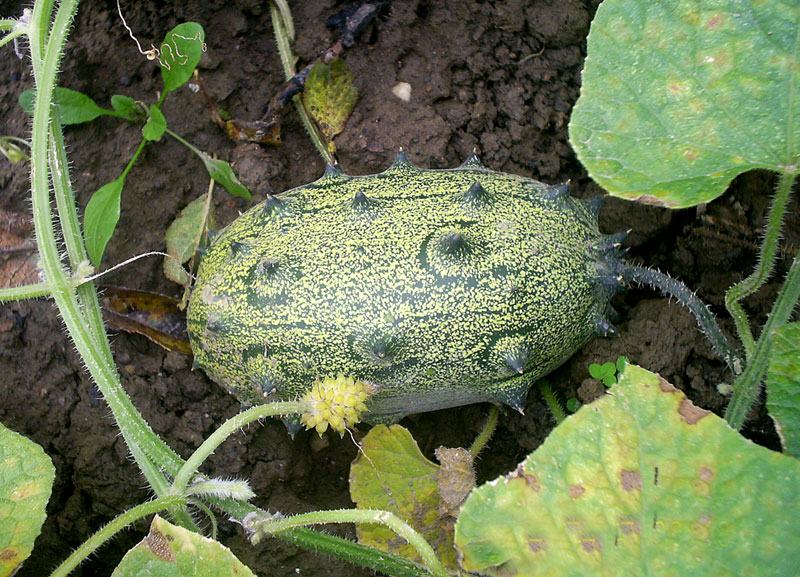

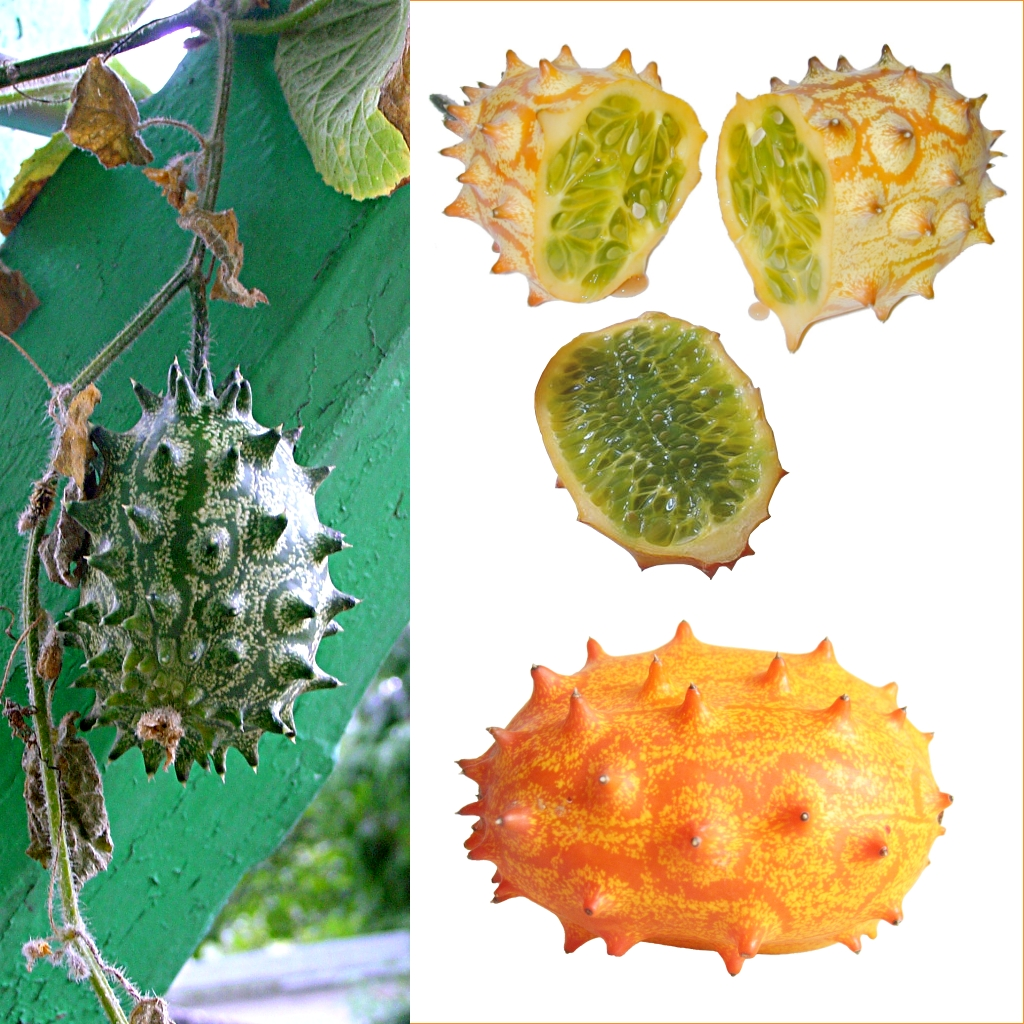

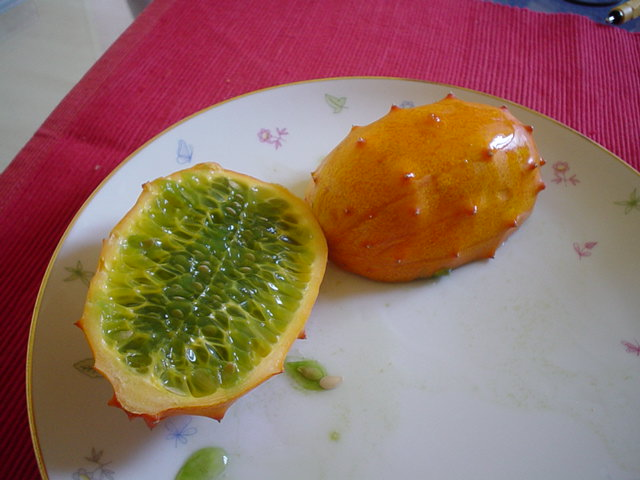

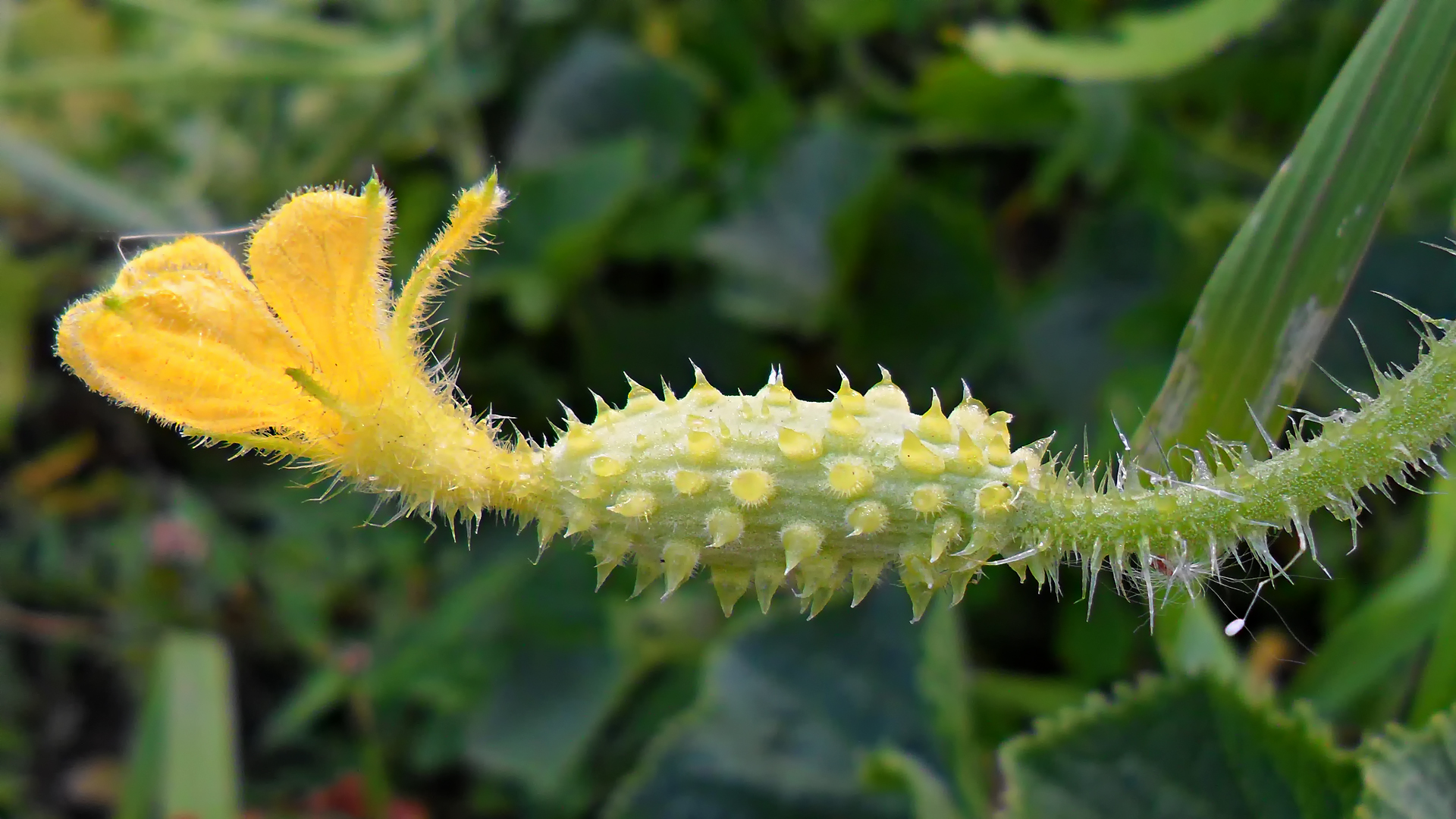
