= Cucumis hystrix =

Scientific classification
- Kingdom: Plantae
- Clade: Tracheophytes
- Clade: Angiosperms
- Clade: Eudicots
- Clade: Rosids
- Order: Cucurbitales
- Family: Cucurbitaceae
- Genus: Cucumis
- Species: C. hystrix

Binomial name
- Cucumis hystrix Chakrav. (1952)

Varieties
- Cucumis hystrix var. hystrix; Cucumis hystrix var. mizoramensis S.R.Yadav & Sutar

Synonyms
- Cucumis muriculatus Chakr.

Species of vine

Cucumis hystrix is a monoecious annual climbing vine in the family Cucurbitaceae. The specific epithet (hystrix) is Neo-Latin for "porcupine".

== Distribution ==
Cucumis hystrix is native southeastern India and Bangladesh east to northern Vietnam and southern China. It grows in scrub jungles, forests edges, and along roadsides up to 5,905.5 feet (1,800.0 meters) in elevation.

== Description ==
The leaves and petioles of the plant are hairy and the leaves have 3–5 lobes and are cordate at the base with acute apexes and dentate margins. They measure 6–13 centimeters (2.4–5.1 inches) in length and 6–12 centimeters (2.4–4.7 inches) in width, and the petioles measure 6–10 centimeters (2.4–3.9 inches) in length. The flowers are solitary and yellow in color and their petals measure 5–6 millimeters in length and 3–4 millimeters in width in males and 8–10 millimeters in length in females. The pedicels measure 5 millimeters in length on female flowers. The fruit is pendent and yellow-green in color and ovate in shape and is covered in spike-like pustules. It measures 4–5 centimeters in length and 1.5–2.3 centimeters in width. It contains numerous seeds. The plant itself measures 2–8 meters (6.6–26.2 feet) in length. It flowers and fruits from September through December.

== Hybridization ==
Cucumis hystrix has shown strong resistance against downy mildew, root-knot nematode, fusarium wilt, and other diseases that affect members of the genus Cucumis, as well as tolerance to low irradiance and temperature, and has been successfully hybridized with Cucumis sativus to create a disease-resistant cucumber plant.
