= Cucumis althaeoides =

Scientific classification
- Kingdom: Plantae
- Clade: Tracheophytes
- Clade: Angiosperms
- Clade: Eudicots
- Clade: Rosids
- Order: Cucurbitales
- Family: Cucurbitaceae
- Genus: Cucumis
- Species: C. althaeoides

Binomial name
- Cucumis althaeoides (Ser.) P.Sebastian & I.Telford

Species of flowering plant

Cucumis althaeoides is a vine in the family Cucurbitaceae that is native to parts of Northern Australia.

== Description ==
Cucumis althaeoides is a trailing or climbing perennial vine that is monoecious, and most of its vegetative parts are covered with hairs or bristles. Its stems range up to 3 m (9.8 ft) long, being about 1.6 mm (0.063 in) in diameter. The stems are ribbed and annually sprout from a perennating rootstock. The tendrils that althaeoides use to climb are simple and range up to 15 cm (5.9 in) long. Its leaves are oval shaped or lanceolate and are generally 24–75 mm (0.94–2.95 in) long and 18–70 mm (0.71–2.76 in) wide, with a leaf stalk up to 18 mm (0.71 in). It has unisexual inflorescences, or clustered flowers. The fruit of Cucumis altheoides are spherical, 8–18 mm (0.31–0.71 in) in diameter, and are a pale green with darker green linear markings. At maturity the fruit turns more red, with 9 to 25 seeds. The seeds are oval shaped and 3.8–4.5 mm (0.15–0.18 in) long.

== Taxonomy ==
The species was first formally described in 2011 by the botanists I.Telford and P.Sebastian as part of the work Cucumis (Cucurbitaceae) in Australia and Eastern Malesia, including newly recognized species and sister species to C. melo. as published in Systematic Botany. Many synonyms are known including; Mukia scabrella, Mukia maderaspatana, Melothria maderaspatana, Melothria althaeoides and Cucumis maderaspatanus.

== Habitat and ecology ==
Cucumis althaeoides is widespread across northern Australia. It has a scattered distribution and is found in the Northern Territory, Queensland and the north east of New South Wales. In Western Australia it is found in the Kimberley and Pilbara regions. In Oxley Wild Rivers National Park, populations of C. althaeoides have been recorded from three sites along the Apsley River and Green Gully Creek.
