= Cucumis variabilis =

Scientific classification
- Kingdom: Plantae
- Clade: Tracheophytes
- Clade: Angiosperms
- Clade: Eudicots
- Clade: Rosids
- Order: Cucurbitales
- Family: Cucurbitaceae
- Genus: Cucumis
- Species: C. variabilis

Binomial name
- Cucumis variabilis P.Sebastian & I.Telford,2011

Species of flowering plant

Cucumis variabilis is a vine in the family Cucurbitaceae that is native to Western Australia throughout parts of the Kimberley region.
