= Cucumis asper =

Scientific classification
- Kingdom: Plantae
- Clade: Embryophytes
- Clade: Tracheophytes
- Clade: Spermatophytes
- Clade: Angiosperms
- Clade: Eudicots
- Clade: Rosids
- Order: Cucurbitales
- Family: Cucurbitaceae
- Genus: Cucumis
- Species: C. asper

Binomial name
- Cucumis asper Cogn.

Synonyms
- Cucumella aspera (Cogn.) C.Jeffrey

Species of flowering plant

Cucumis asper, also known as rough cucumber, is a subshrub from the genus Cucumis. It was first described by Célestine Alfred Cogniaux and published in the Bulletin de l'Herbier Boissier in 1901. The plant is native to Namibia, Southern Africa and primarily grows in deserts or dry shrubland regions.
