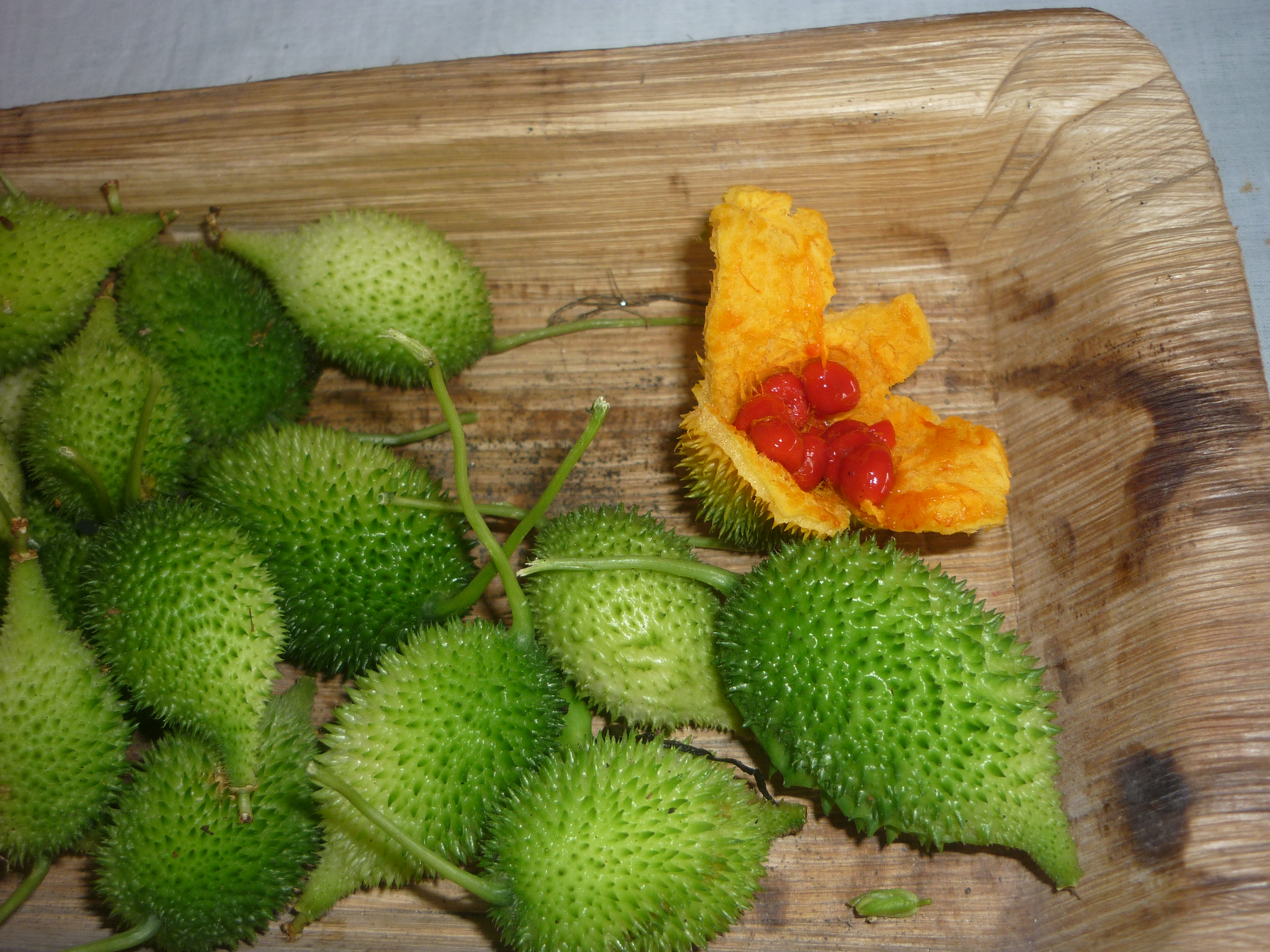

Scientific classification
- Kingdom: Plantae
- Clade: Tracheophytes
- Clade: Angiosperms
- Clade: Eudicots
- Clade: Rosids
- Order: Cucurbitales
- Family: Cucurbitaceae
- Genus: Momordica
- Species: M. dioica

Binomial name
- Momordica dioica Roxb. ex Willd.

Synonyms
- Momordica dioeca Roxb.; Momordica hamiltoniana Wall. ex G.Don; Momordica heyneana Wall. ex G.Don; Momordica hispida Dennst.; Momordica missionis Wall.; Momordica sicyoides Ser.; Momordica trilobata Wight ex Steud.; Momordica tuberosa Dennst.; Momordica wallichii M.Roem.; Trichosanthes russeliana Wall. ex G.Don

= Momordica dioica =

Species of flowering plant

Momordica dioica, commonly known as spiny gourd or spine gourd or teasle gourd and also known as bristly balsam pear, is a species of flowering plant in the Cucurbitaceae/gourd family. It is propagated by underground tubers. It has small leaves, small yellow flowers, it has small, dark green, round or oval fruits. It is dioecious, which means that it has distinct male and female individual organisms, hence its name.

== Uses ==
Momordica dioica is used as a vegetable in all regions of India and in South Asia. It has commercial importance and is exported and used locally. The fruits are cooked with spices, or fried and sometimes eaten with meat or fish.

== Gallery ==
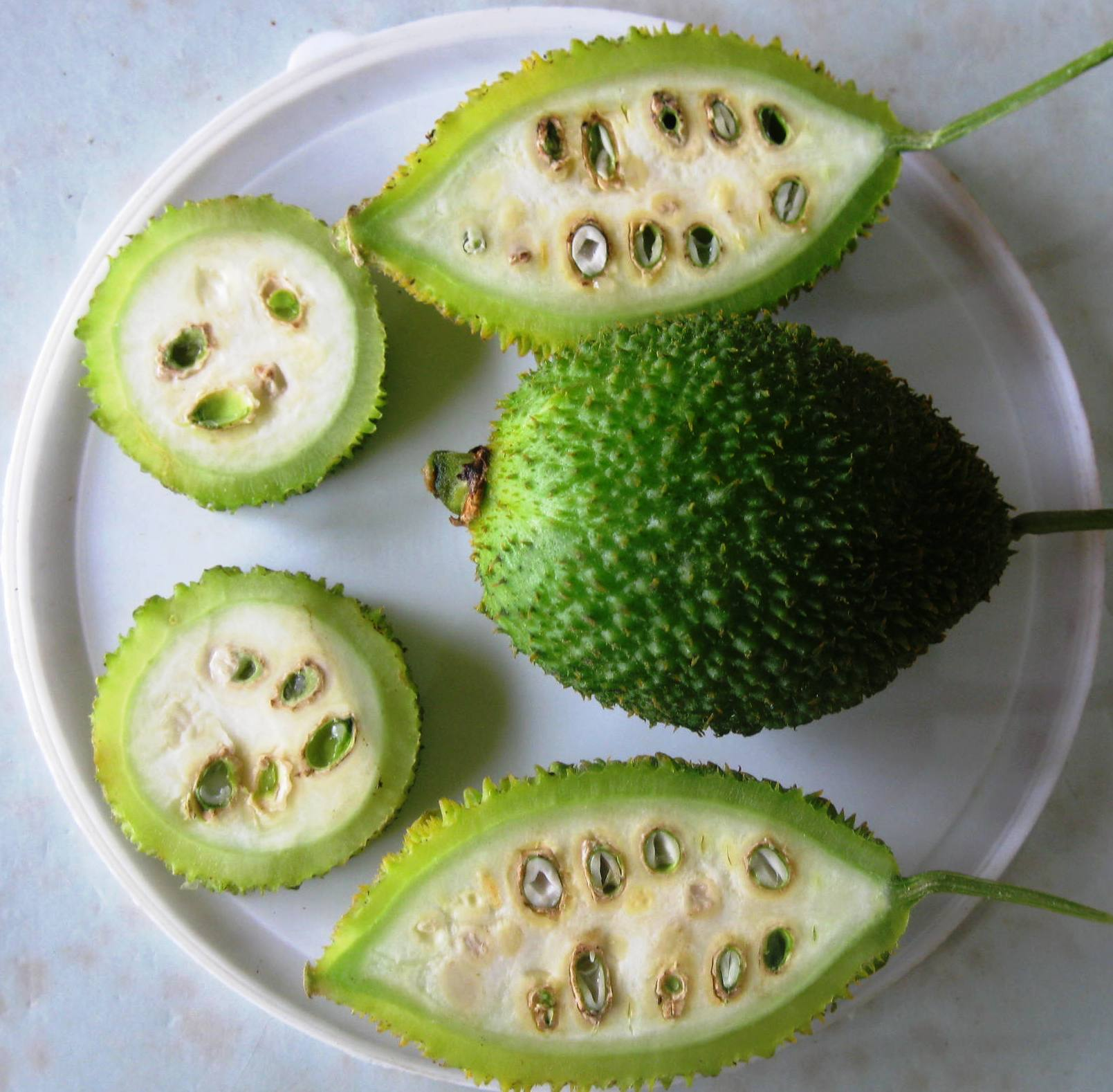
Halves and cross sections

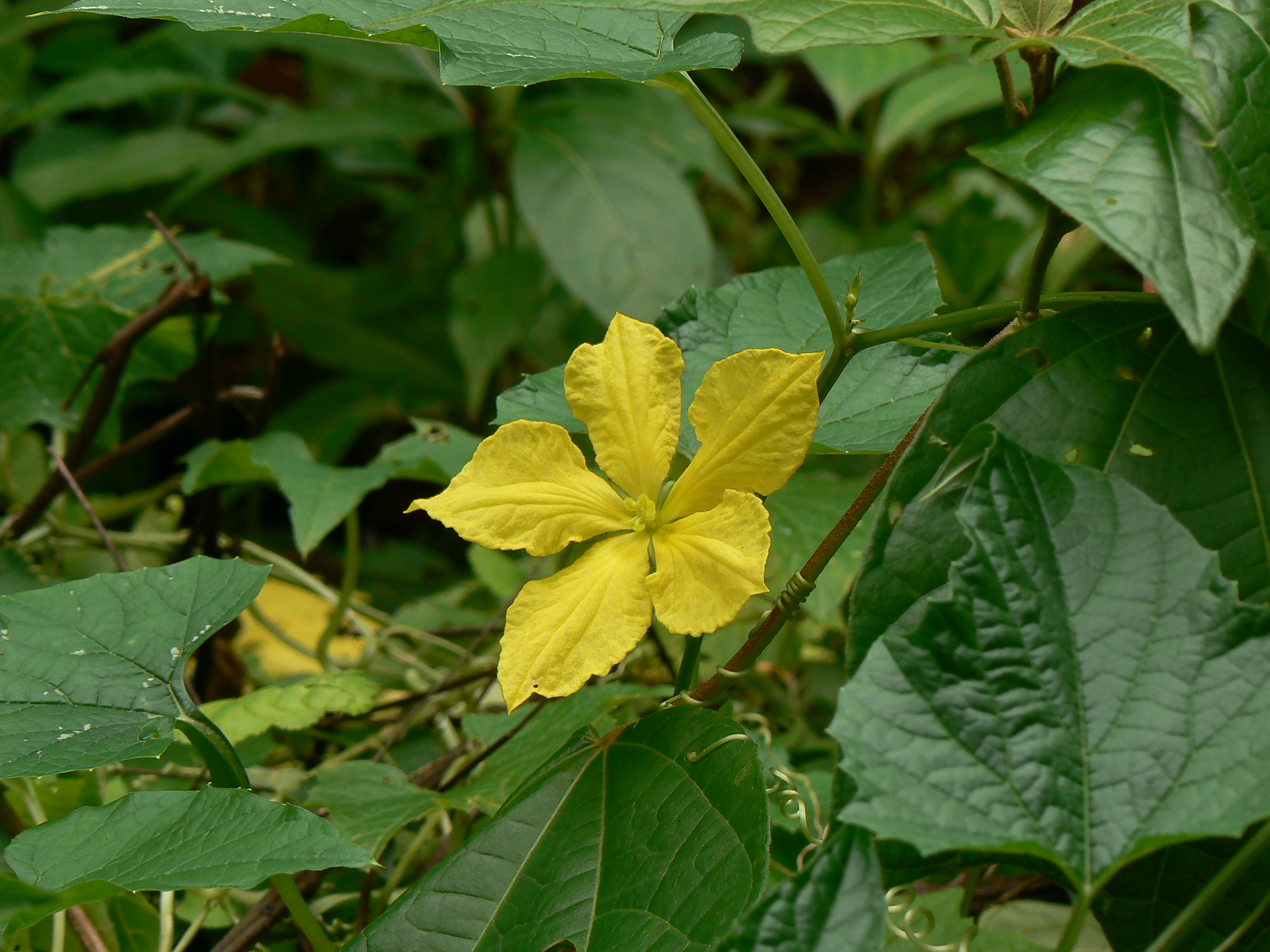
Flower

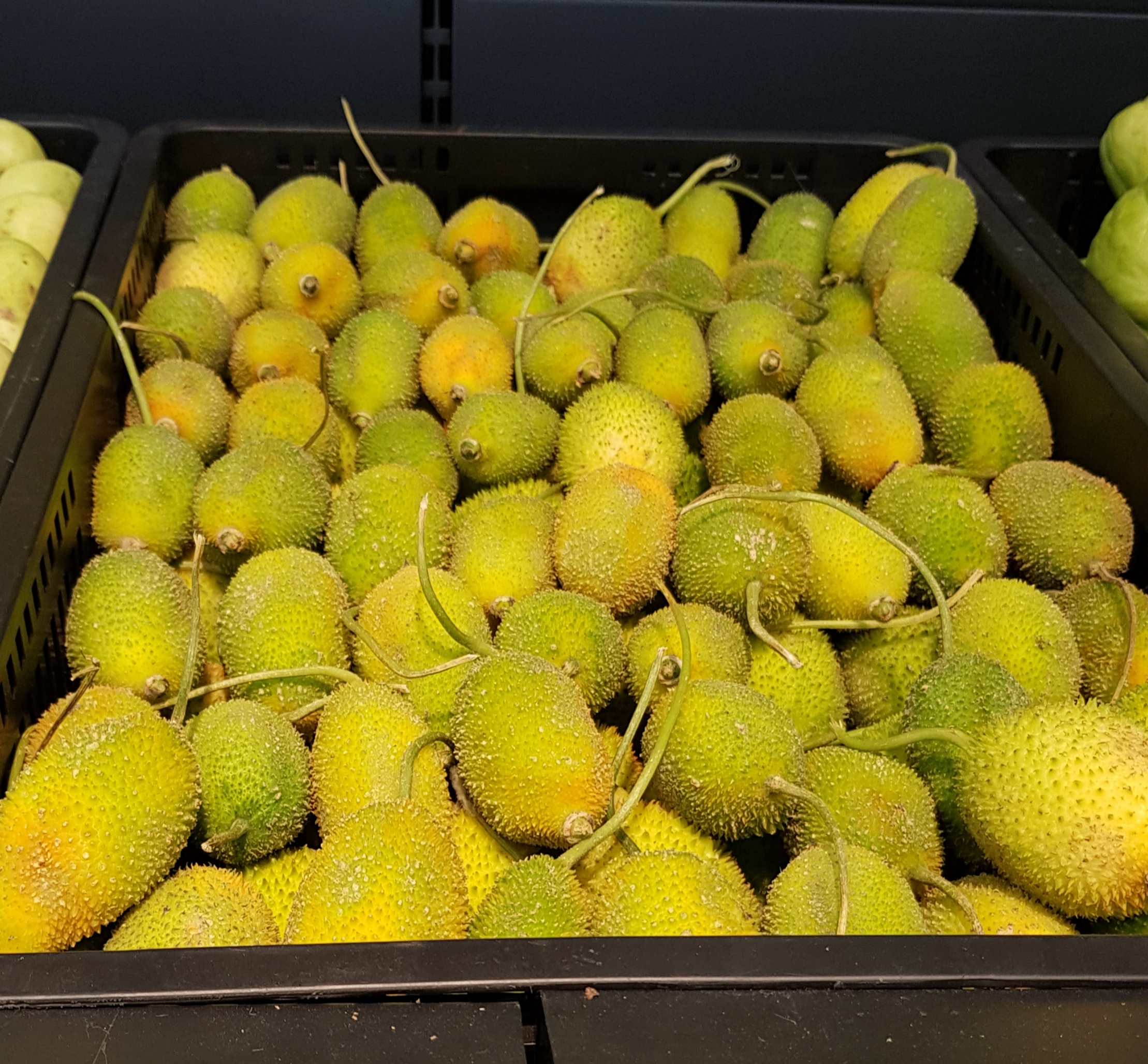

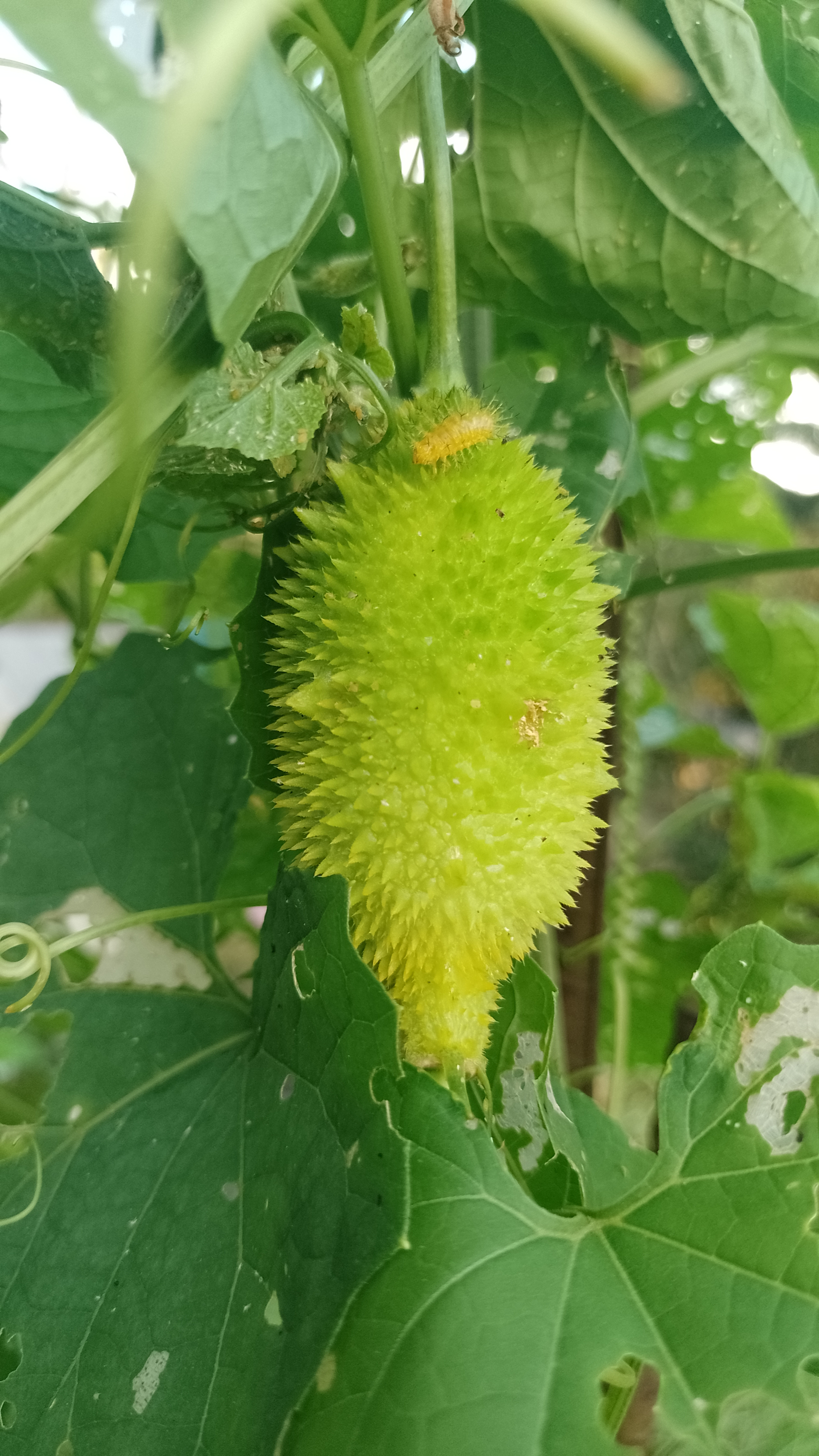
Affected by insects.
