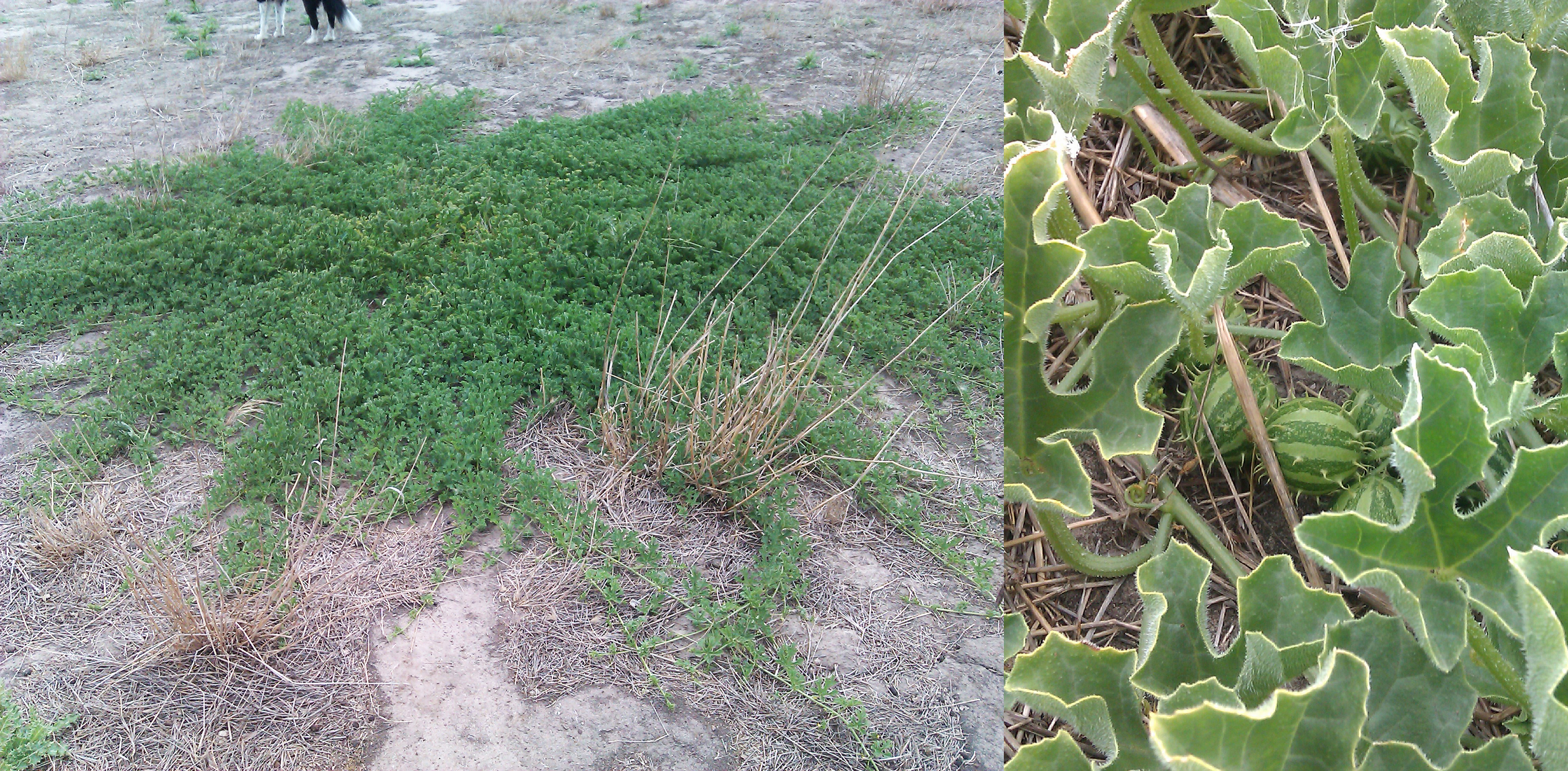

Scientific classification
- Kingdom: Plantae
- Clade: Embryophytes
- Clade: Tracheophytes
- Clade: Spermatophytes
- Clade: Angiosperms
- Clade: Eudicots
- Clade: Rosids
- Order: Cucurbitales
- Family: Cucurbitaceae
- Genus: Cucumis
- Species: C. myriocarpus

Binomial name
- Cucumis myriocarpus E. Mey. ex Naud.

= Cucumis myriocarpus =

Berry and plant

Cucumis myriocarpus, the gooseberry cucumber, gooseberry gourd, paddy melon, mallee pear or prickly paddy melon, is a prostrate or climbing annual herb native to tropical and southern Africa. It has small, round, yellow-green or green-striped fruit with soft spines, small yellow flowers and deeply lobed, light green leaves. The melon occurs in disturbed soil and cleared or bare areas, and thrives on summer moisture.

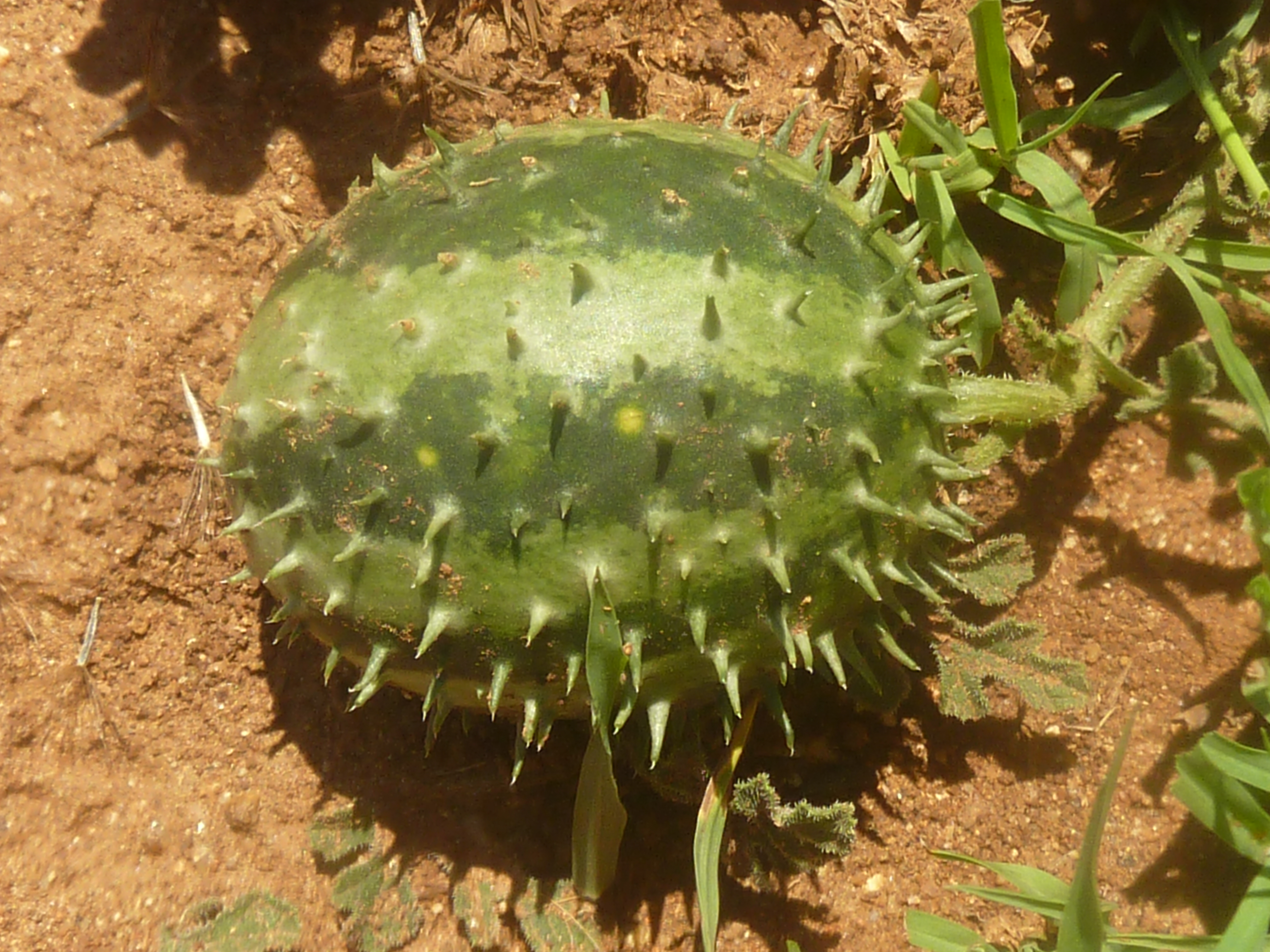
C. myriocarpus fruit

The entire plant is toxic due to the presence of various cucurbitacins. The plant is toxic to humans as well as to horses, sheep, cattle and pigs and it has been associated with livestock deaths. It has been used by humans as an emetic. There are records of poisoning occurring in humans.

The melon is a noxious weed in Australia and in California, where it may also be known as prickly paddy melon, bitter apple, gooseberry gourd and gooseberry cucumber. One of many invasive species in Australia, it is highly damaging to the economy, with the farmers bearing most of the cost.

Cucumis myriocarpus (paddy melon) is often confused with Citrullus lanatus (the Afghan melon, camel melon or bitter wooly melon) in Australia, where both species are introduced. Cucumis myriocarpus has many small fruit, hidden under the leaves. The fruit are smaller than a golf ball and green in colour, developing to yellow on maturity. The larger melons commonly seen on roadsides in rural Australia are in fact Citrullus lanatus, a wild relative of the watermelon. The confusion is widespread in Australia, such that in common parlance, the term "paddy melon" is understood to mean the larger green/yellow fruit of the Citrullus lanatus. Children in rural Australia often use the fruit of this plant as an opportunistic source of entertainment, for example by throwing it at each other's feet, or squeezing the fruit to shoot the seeds at each other.

Paddy and Afghan melons (collectively referred to as wild melons) sometimes occur in mixed infestations in Australia. They vary only slightly in colour and appearance, with Citrullus lanatus leaves being a little more variegated than those of Cucumis myriocarpus. Fruit size is the clearest identifying factor. However, management of all wild melons is similar, apart from some variation in sensitivity to the herbicide glyphosate. Mechanical removal of small infestations is the simplest control method, and cultivation at early stages of growth can be effective. Large infestations are sometimes controlled by the spray-graze method, in which plants are sprayed with a sublethal dose of hormone herbicide to make them more palatable to stock, and the area is heavily grazed three days later. Toxicity is managed by making other feed available.

Both wild melon species have a similar unpleasant odor when broken or disturbed. That makes them less palatable to stock, so poisoning tends to occur only when little other feed is available.

The plant occurs in Spain, where it is naturalized and known by the common names of habanera or sandía habanera.
