= Sugar melon =

Melon cultivar

A sugar melon is a type of cantaloupe that is about 5–6 in (13–15 cm) in diameter and weighing between 2.5 and 4 lb (1.1 and 1.8 kg). Nearly round in shape, it has thick, sweet, orange flesh and a silvery gray, ribbed exterior.
