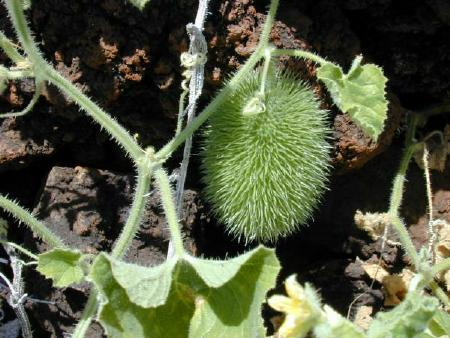
- Cucumis dipsaceus leaves and fruit

Scientific classification
- Kingdom: Plantae
- Clade: Tracheophytes
- Clade: Angiosperms
- Clade: Eudicots
- Clade: Rosids
- Order: Cucurbitales
- Family: Cucurbitaceae
- Genus: Cucumis
- Species: C. dipsaceus

Binomial name
- Cucumis dipsaceus C.G. Ehrenb. ex Spach

= Cucumis dipsaceus =

Species of plant

Cucumis dipsaceus, also known as Arabian cucumber or hedgehog cucumber, is an annual climbing herb that can be found in tropical and arid locations. The plant is native to eastern Africa, first found in Sudan, southern Egypt, and Ethiopia. The developed fruits of the plant change from green to yellow and contain many seeds. The hairs that cover the oblong fruits nickname this species the “hedgehog cucumber”.

C. dipsaceus has several usages, as fodder, medicine, and human consumption. The cucumber is normally collected in the wild, but has also been domesticated. The young shoots and leaves of the plant are traditionally cooked with groundnut paste, and with coconut milk when available. The fruit of the plant is used medicinally as an analgesic.

C. dipsaceus has become invasive all across the Americas. This includes islands in Hawaii, several states in the U.S. and islands in South America as well. There are no known methods of control.

== Distribution ==
Cucumis dipsaceus is native to Eastern Africa, first found in Sudan, Southern Egypt, and Ethiopia. C. dipsaceus is cultivated in Eastern Africa and is a commercial crop. The leaf of C. dipsaceus is consumed in these areas for its nutritional value. The fruit of the plant has also been used medicinally as an analgesic.

The vine has spread to grow in Kenya, Somalia, regions of Tanzania, and Uganda. C. dipsaceus can also be found in India in the states of Karnataka and Tamil Nadu with evidence of the plant growing further south of these regions. The method by which the vine spread is not documented, however it is possible that it may have been imported along with food grains. C. dipsaceus has also spread to some islands and some mainlands in the Eastern hemisphere, where it is considered an invasive species. The plant species is invasive in Hawaii, some of the Galapagos islands, Mexico, Peru, and Ecuador.

== Habitat and ecology ==
Cucumis dipsaceus is an annual climbing herb that can be found in different habitats. C. dipsaceus grows in tropical and arid locations, and is sparsely present in areas dominated by low lying and dense vegetation. C. dipsaceus is well adapted to grow in disturbed woods and areas that have been prepared by people for agriculture. The herb can be found at elevations of 400 m-1,800 m. It is uncommon in foothills and more common in higher grasslands and woodlands.

== Morphology ==
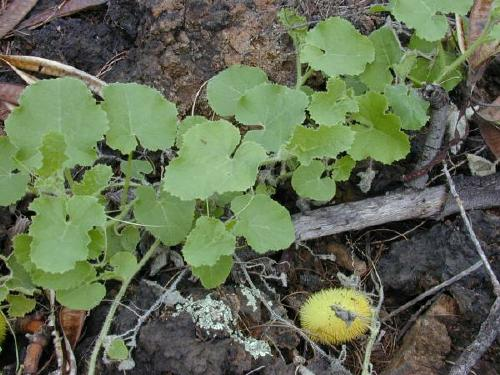
Cucumis dipsaceus leaves and fruit

The stems of C. dipsaceus grow several meters long with a climbing habit and are covered with tiny hairs (Lata and Mittal). The stems are quadrangular like those of the mint family and are hispid and weak (Geethakumary et al). It can also be found growing procumbent and trailing along the ground without growing further roots along the nodes.

The leaves are pubescent, cordate, and have a circular shape (Geethakumary et al). They are trilobed and notched at the base where the leaf connects to the petiole which gives the leaf a “heart” shape in appearance (Lata and Mittal). The leaves grow 2–8 cm long and 3–9 cm wide with hairs covering both sides of the leaf surfaces (Geethakumary et al).

The petiole ranges from 2–10 cm long and is also covered in tiny hairs (Lata and Mittal).

The seeds resemble those of other fruits in the cucumber family having an elongated football shape and are pointed at both ends. The coloration of the seeds are a caramel brown when dry which can be compared to that of the European cucumber, C. sativus, which remains smooth and pale tan in color (Lata and Mittal).

C. dipsaceus, like many species in the cucumber family, do not bend dramatically at the nodes and are not considered geniculate. Internode spacing ranges from 2–6 cm long (Lata and Mittal).

The roots of C. dipsaceus do not form tubers. The roots do not harden nor do they develop a woody outer layer (Lata and Mittal).

== Flowers and fruit ==
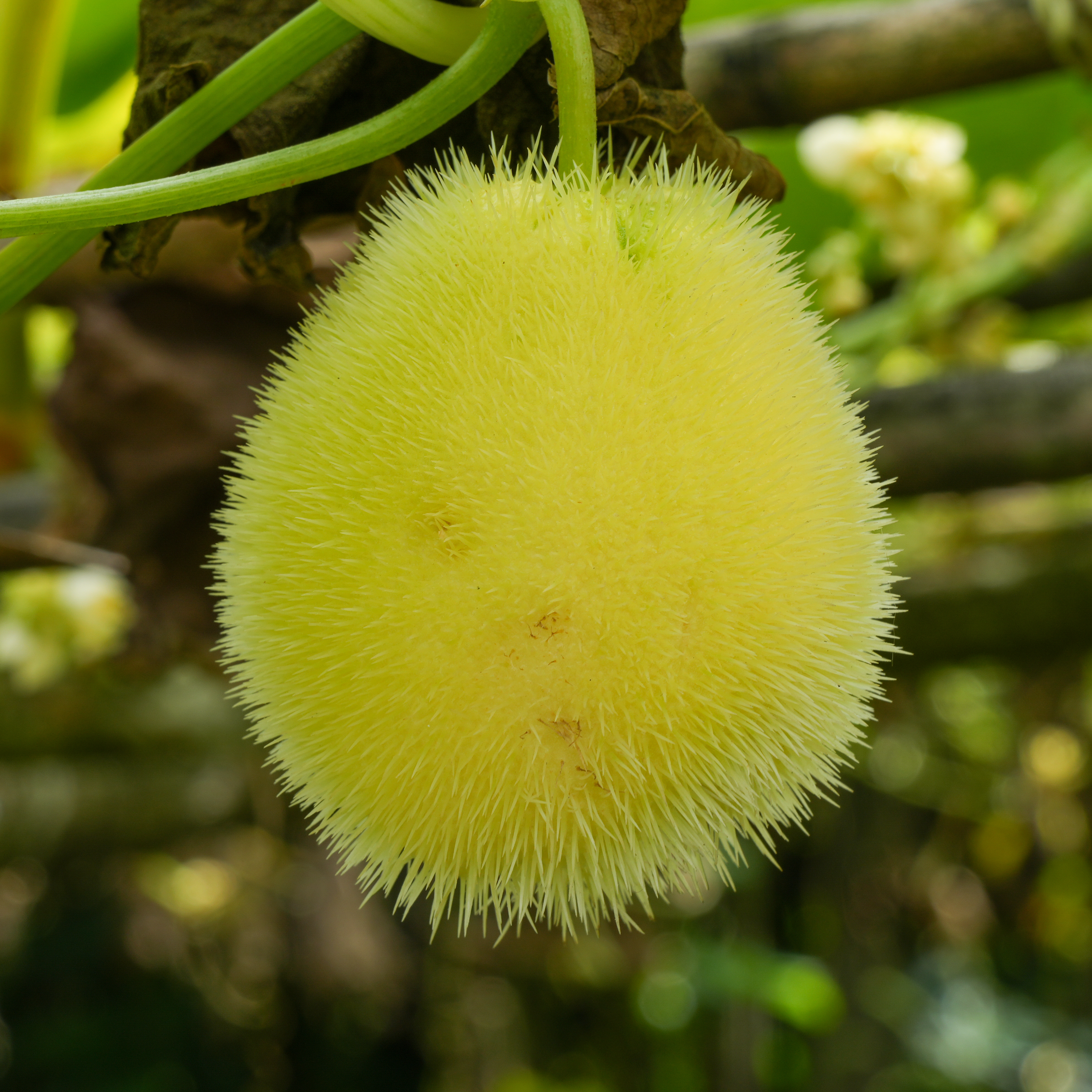
Yellow ripening fruit, Meghalaya, India

The inflorescence of C. dipsaceus is monoecious and unisexual with each plant having separate male and female flowers. The male flowers range from 1-1.2 x 2-2.5 cm, are “corolla yellow,” and have three stamens with 2mm long anthers. Female flowers range from 2-2.3 x 2-2.2 cm, are also “corolla yellow”, and have three-lobed stigmas. Both the male and female flower sexes do not have bracts. Flowering occurs from September to November with subsequent fruiting in its native range.

The developing and immature fruits of C. dipsaceus are green and densely covered in tiny hairs. The hairs that cover the oblong fruits nickname this species the “hedgehog cucumber” (Lata and Mittal). As the fruits develop they change from green to yellow and contain many seeds (Geethakumary et al). The hairs do not fall off like that of a kiwi fruit. The fruit of C. dipsaceus ranges between 6–6.5 cm (2.4–2.6 in) in length and 2.5–4 cm (0.98–1.57 in) in diameter. In its native habitat, fruiting for this species occurs from November to January.

== Usage ==
Cucumis dipsaceus has several usages, being used in both cooking and medicine. The cucumber is normally collected in the wild, but is also grown and harvested locally.

=== Food ===
Cucumis dipsaceus is a good source for amino acids including threonine, cysteine, methionine, valine, isoleucine, tyrosine, histidine, phenylalanine and lysine, having higher values in alanine, leucine, and arginine. The fruit's macronutrient composition mainly consists of starch (1.07 mg/g) and proteins (85.9 mg/g). The cucumber also contains varying amounts of minerals including N, P, K, Na, Mg, Mn, Ca, Fe, Zn, Cu, Si, and B, proving to be a good source of calcium (14820 ppm) and nitrogen (6300 ppm). The young shoots and leaves of the plant are traditionally cooked with groundnut paste, and with coconut milk when available. The fruit is recommended to be cooked for human consumption.

=== Medicinal ===
Medicinally, C. dipsaceus is believed to have topical healing properties, although not widely practiced. Poultice (a moist mass of the plant material wrapped in cloth) is created with the leaves and tendrils of the plant, and placed on surface injuries for the treatment of wounds. The poultices are also used for treatment of soreness and inflammation. When ingested, the fruit itself is thought to treat gastrointestinal diseases, diarrhea, stomach pain, constipation, and meningitis. The roots of the plant when ingested are thought to treat hepatitis and gallstones.

=== Other usages ===
The seeds of the plant have been imported to countries such as India through grains. These seeds have been used in both trade and animal feed. For animal feed specifically, the plant's leaves and fruit are used for fodder (animal feed that is given to domestic livestock).

== Conservation status ==
In 2010, the occurrence of Cucumis dipsaceus in India was reported. The source of Cucumis dipsaceus is unknown; probably the seeds might have come to India by food imports (M. P., Deepu). Some specimens of Cucumis dipsaceus were collected from open scrub and thickets in Kuppam forest, India. The habit of this species is trailing and extended to 3–4 meters in gravelly soil. The observed Cucumis dipsaceus are good at growth and extended but weak at multiplies, there are only very few individuals observed. Four populations possessing xeric adaptability with almost 18 mature individuals were observed along a 12 km-long transect. In Kuppam forest, human intervention is the only threat observed for this species.

According to the Pacific Island Ecosystems at Risk (PIER), C. dipsaceus has become invasive all across the Americas. This includes islands in Hawaii, several states in the U.S. and islands in South America as well. There are no known methods of control for this species and PIER is looking for solutions.
