= Red peas soup =

Jamaican soup

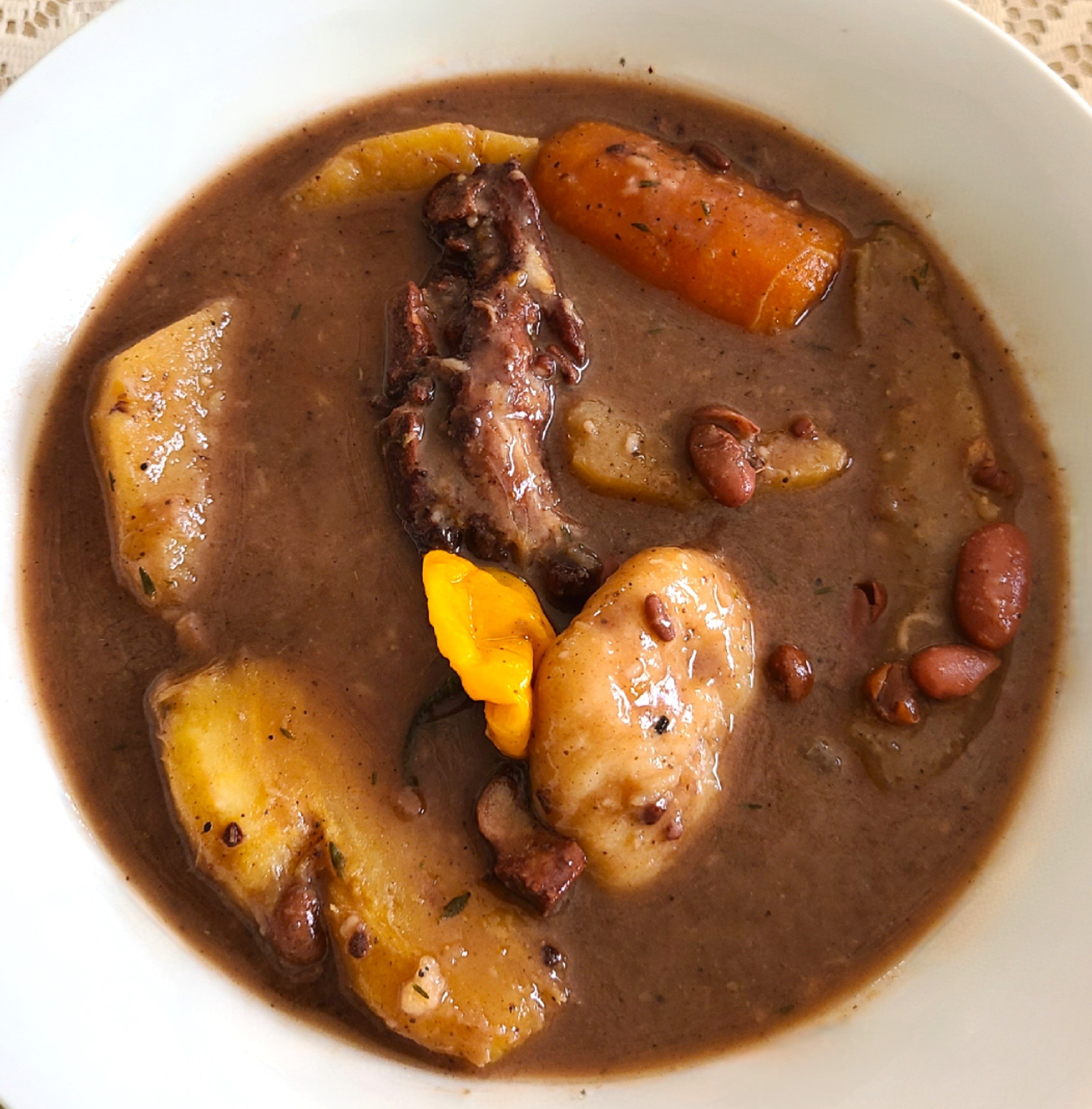
- Jamaican red peas soup made with kidney beans, cow peas, Jerusalem peas and pig tail
- Course: Soup
- Place of origin: Jamaica
- Main ingredients: Kidney beans, cured meats, coconut milk, herbs, scotch bonnet and ground provisions

Red peas soup is a hearty Jamaican soup, made with kidney beans (known locally as red peas), cured meats, coconut milk, root vegetables, dumplings, herbs and spices like Scotch bonnet, pimento, scallion etc. It is the soup version of Jamaican stew peas, and is similar to other red bean soups made in the Americas. The dish is served as an appetizer or main course. Like stew peas, red peas soup is rich in protein as the main ingredients are legumes (beans/peas) and meats.

== History ==
Red peas soup originated in Jamaica, and it is one of many Creole dishes created from a fusion of cooking techniques and ingredients, contributed by various ethnic groups who have inhabited the island.

One of the main ingredients of red peas soup, kidney beans, originated in Peru around 8,000 B.C., and cultivars were spread throughout the Americas by Indigenous Amerindians, the Arawaks/Taínos— then later the Spanish and Portuguese, who introduced them to other regions through the Columbian Exchange. Other staple crops which are key ingredients, like peppers (specifically Scotch bonnet), corn and sweet potato, were taken to Jamaica in canoes from Mesoamerica and South America. The Taínos also cultivated chayote (cho cho), coco, pumpkin, yam (yampi or cush-cush yam), arrowroot, potato, cassava and pimento. They are believed to have kept a stock pot in which meat, fish and vegetables were collected for soup— thus, influencing Jamaica's soups.

The Spaniards, the first Europeans to colonize Jamaica in the 15th century, introduced pigs, cattle and other livestock to the island. They also introduced carrot, garlic, thyme and other vegetables and herbs to the region, as well as, cured meats like pickled pigtail, salted pork and salted beef. Consequently, many Jamaican dishes which include peas/beans, cured meats, stews (like stew peas) and soups like peas soups were influenced by them. The Africans who arrived during slavery and indentureship also added their own influence to this and other colonial era dishes, including the use of gungo peas, dasheen and yam. Chinese indentured labourers influenced the use of scallion, which was introduced to the island by the indentured East Indians.

== Preparation ==
Jamaican red peas soup is prepared using kidney beans (red peas) and other similar cultivars like round red, Jerusalem peas or cow peas. The recipe includes coconut milk and meats, especially salted meats such as pork and beef. Pig tail or ham bone is often included, and sometimes chicken is used instead of pork or beef. Additional ingredients include onion, garlic, thyme, scallion, scotch bonnet, other herbs and spices, soup mix, flour dumplings (including slender dumplings called spinners) and ground provisions— such as yam, Irish potato, sweet potato, chayote (cho cho), coco, carrot, corn and pumpkin. Sometimes, the soup is made with green breadfruit or chicken foot, and it may be cooked in a pressure cooker. A meatless version referred to as ital red peas soup, is made by Jamaican Rastafarians. The dish is served hot and the consistency is thick. It is eaten as an appetizer or a complete meal, on any occasion. Red peas soup is considered to be a nutritious Jamaican staple, which is sold in restaurants or as a street food.

== Variations and similar dishes ==
In Jamaica, gungo peas soup is a variation made with pigeon peas (called gungo peas) and the same ingredients. It is a popular soup made with leftover ham bone from Christmas. Sometimes, gourmet versions of red peas soup appear on the menus of local restaurants as "cream of red peas soup".

Similar soups are prepared throughout the Americas, which are called red bean soup, sopa de habichuelas, sopa de frijoles ("soup of red beans" in Spanish), or sancocho de habichuelas, caldo de habichuelas ("bean broth"), Mexican frijoles charros, black bean soup, Antillean black bean soup and others. Also, there are soup dishes with beans and meats from Spain and Portugal, that bear similarities to Jamaican red peas soup and regional variations, like Spanish black bean soup and Portuguese bean soup.

== See also ==
- List of Jamaican dishes
- Jamaican cuisine
- Stew peas
- Hong dou tang
- Jamaican pepperpot soup
