= Culture of Grenada =

Grenada's French colonists brought their culture, as did the African slaves they brought across the Atlantic for agricultural work. Indians have also influenced the island culture in more recent years.

With the passing of the Slave Trade Act 1807 by the British Parliament and the subsequent abolishing of slavery, indentured labor from India was procured at a very large scale.

The first ship, named the Maidstone, departed from Calcutta, India on January 27, 1857, and arrived a few months later on May 1. In all, 3,206 East Indians arrived in Grenada by 1885. Only 380 of them returned to India. The Indians made many contributions to Grenada. Indian Arrival Day was celebrated in 2007 on the 150th anniversary, for the first time since the centenary celebration in 1957.

The Indians later on assimilated with the existing Africans, Europeans and other ethnicities intermarrying with each other. This very much influenced the culture and cuisine of Grenada.

== Cuisine ==
The national dish, oil down, is a combination of breadfruit, coconut milk, turmeric (misnamed saffron), dumplings, callaloo (taro leaves), and salted meat such as saltfish (cod), smoked herring or salt beef. It is often cooked in a large pot, commonly referred to by locals as a karhee, or curry pot. Popular street foods include aloo pie, doubles, and dal puri served wrapped around a curry, commonly goat, and fried bakes and fish cakes. Sweets include kurma, guava cheese, fudge or barfi, tamarind balls, rum-raisin ice cream, currant rolls, and Grenadian spice cake. Nutmeg and mace (spice) are used in abundance.

== Music and festivals ==
Music plays a significant part in Grenadian culture, with the annual Carnival competition generating new soca and calypso material in August. The rest of the time soca, calypso, and reggae are popular. Zouk music has also been imported to Grenada from other French Caribbean islands recently. Other local celebrations include the National Dance Festival and Independence Day.
