= Tail as food =

Tail as food can refer to:

- Oxtail
- Pork tail
- Tail fat
