= Oil down =

Grenadian stew

Oildown
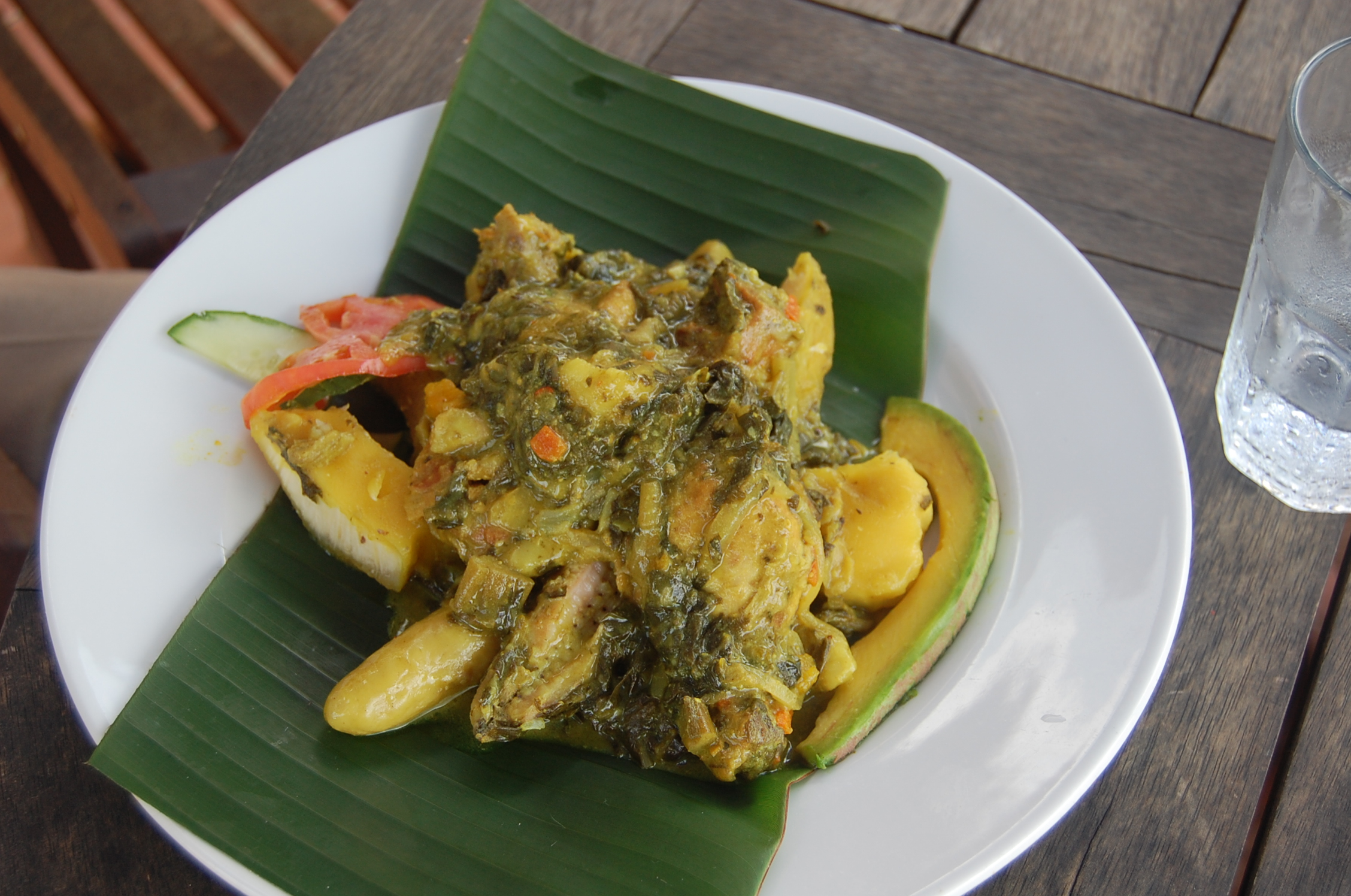
- Plated oil down
- Type: Stew
- Place of origin: Grenada
- Main ingredients: Breadfruit, salted meat or chicken, coconut milk, spices
- Variations: seafood

Oil down is a salted meat and vegetable stew that is the national dish of Grenada.

Oil down is popular in local restaurants.

== Description ==
Oil down is a stew of breadfruit, salted meat, chicken, dumplings, callaloo, and other vegetables stewed in coconut milk, herbs, and spices. The name refers to the fact that the oil from the coconut milk used in cooking is either absorbed by the ingredients or settles to the bottom of the cooking pot. All of the liquid is cooked down (dried out), hence the name oil down.

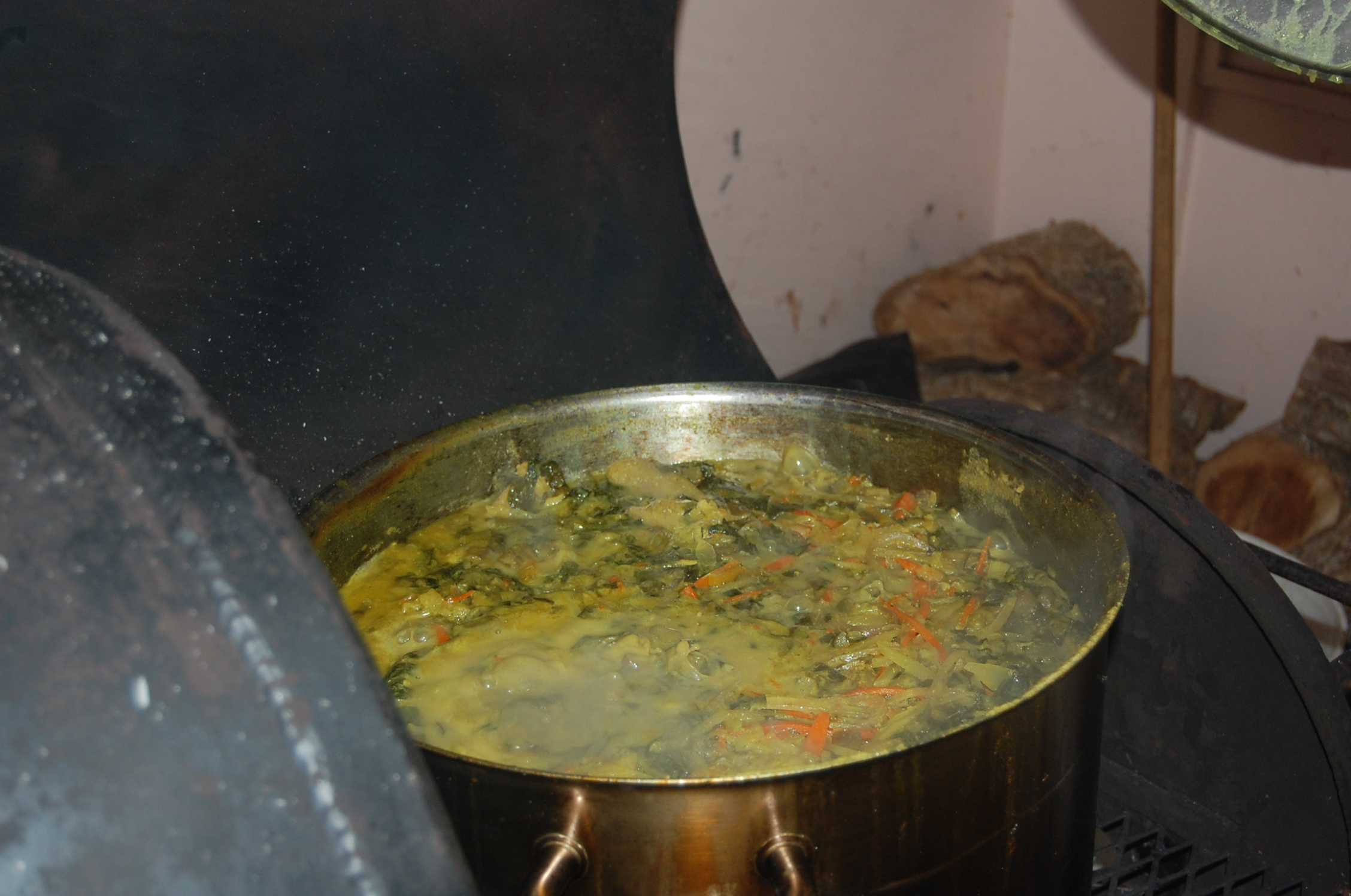
Oil down during cooking

There is no set recipe for oil down, as each household and each parish make it to suit their preference.

Unlike most stews, in which the ingredients get a thorough mixing during the cooking process, a pot of oil down is "packed." Exactly how to "pack the pot" is a matter of taste and tradition, as well as a subject of occasional controversy. Everyone has a different order and method, but usually the breadfruit and meat goes on the bottom, most of the vegetables in the middle, and the callaloo leaves and dumplings on top. The ingredients simmer in situ.

— Scott Neuman, N.P.R. News

Traditionally, the dish is finished when all the liquid has been absorbed, which usually takes at least an hour, depending on the size of (the) pot.

— "Meat Loves Salt" blog

== Variations ==
Oil down is not unique to Grenada. It is also popular in nearby Trinidad and Tobago, which share a long history of cultural influences with Grenada. There are differences in how each island makes its oil down, however, with Grenadians preferring dasheen, dumplings, and turmeric, while Trinidadians tend toward a simpler dish without dumplings but with hot peppers. There are different versions of this stew in other Caribbean countries as well. In Guyana, a similar stew is called mettagee, or mettem, and in Jamaica, there is a seafood version called run down.

== See also ==
- Culture of Grenada
- List of stews
- Stew peas – a similar Jamaican stew
