= Callaloo (disambiguation) =

Callaloo may refer to:

In cuisine:

- Callaloo, a Caribbean dish sometimes called pepperpot, made with the leaves of a plant also called "callaloo"
  - Amaranthus, a genus of herb used to make the dish
  - Malanga, or Xanthosoma, a plant used to make the dish
  - Taro, a plant used to make the dish
- "Kalalou" is Haitian Kreyol for Okra

In academia:

- Callaloo (literary magazine), a literary magazine
