= Run down =

Stew dish

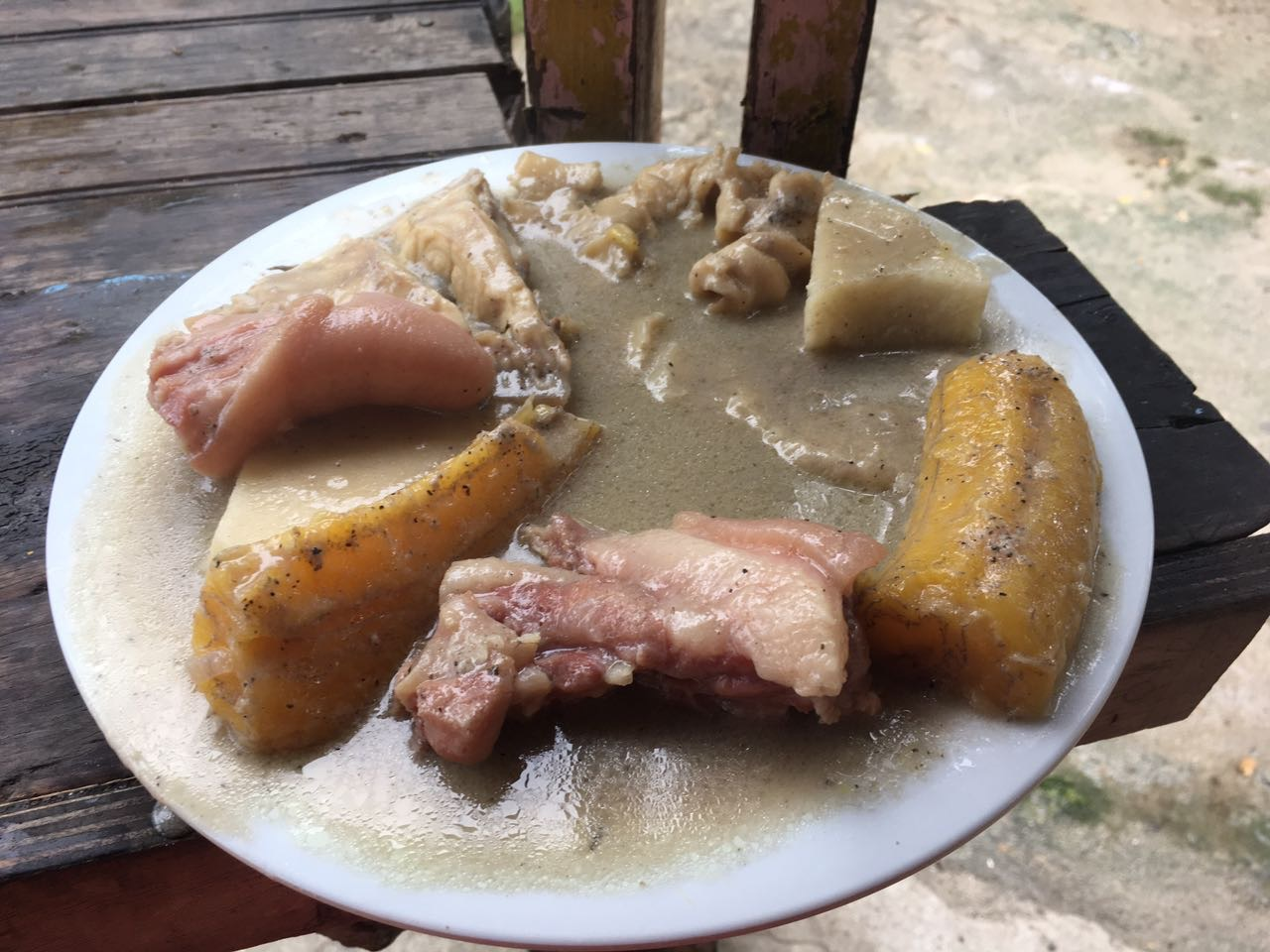
- A plate of rondón
- Alternative names: Rundown, run dun, rondón, fling-me-far, and fling mi for
- Type: Stew
- Place of origin: Originated in Jamaica and is a common dish in throughout Caribbean, Central America, northern parts of South America
- Main ingredients: Fish (typically mackerel), coconut milk, plantain, yams, tomatoes, onion, seasonings

Run down, also referred to as rundown, run dun, rondón, fling-me-far, and fling mi for, is a stew dish in Jamaican cuisine and Tobago cuisine. The traditional Jamaican dish is eaten in several Latin American countries that share a coast with the Caribbean Sea.

It consists of a soup made up of reduced coconut milk, with different types of seafood (fish, crabs, small lobsters or shellfish), plantain, yam, tomato, onion, and seasonings. Mackerel and salted mackerel are often used in the dish. Other fish are also used, including locally caught fish, cod, salt cod, shad, other oily fish, red snapper, swordfish, pickled fish, bull pizzle, and cassava. Traditionally, the dish is served with side dishes of dumplings or baked breadfruit.

Run down is typically available in Jamaican restaurants, and is also a traditional Jamaican breakfast dish. It is a common dish in the Antilles, insular Colombia, Honduras, Panama, Costa Rica, Nicaragua and Venezuela, also.

== History ==
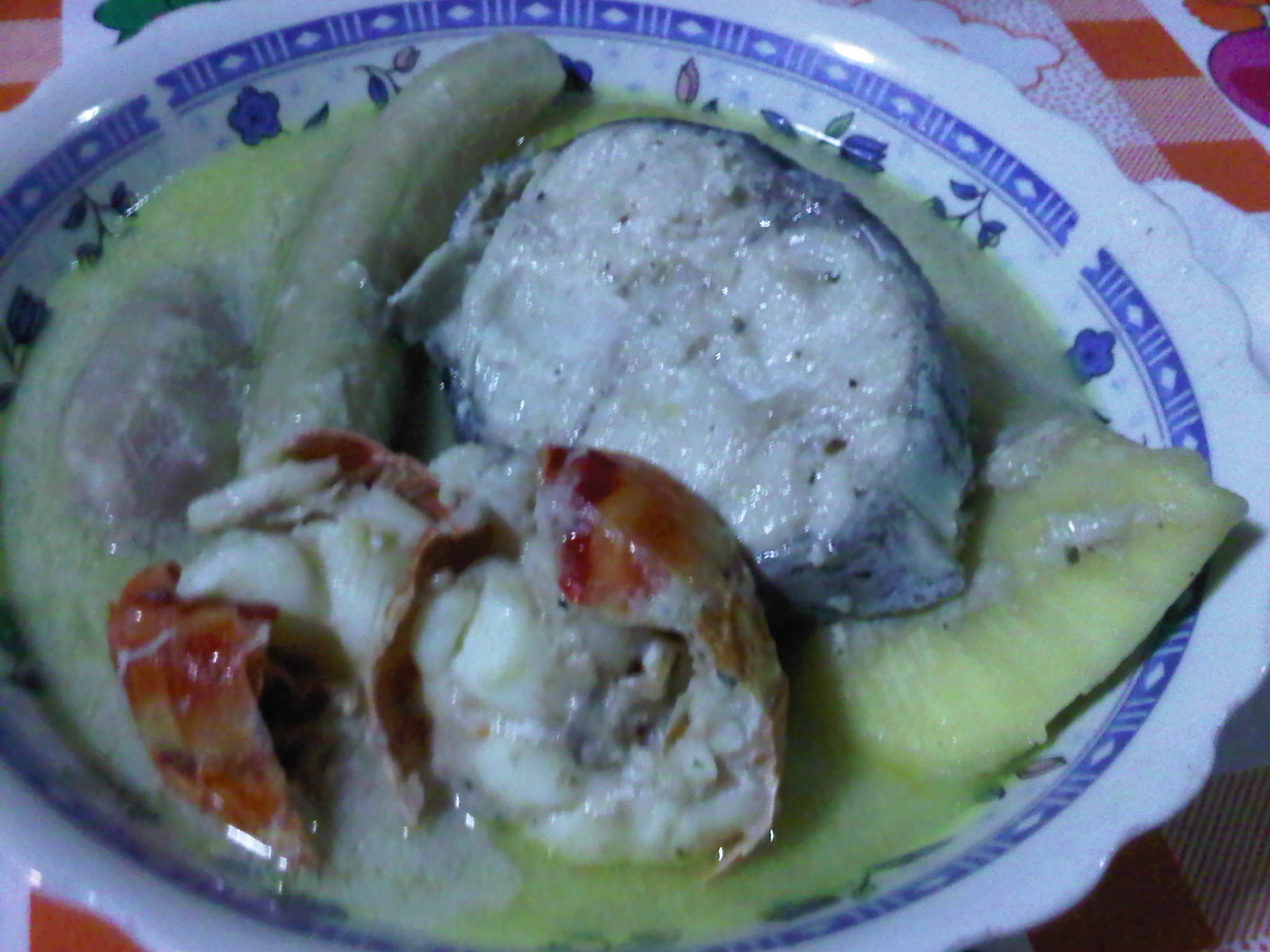
With lobster, barracuda, and root vegetables

Rondón originated in Jamaica and was exported to Latin America by the Afro-Jamaican immigrant workers who migrated in the early 19th century to build projects such as the Panama Canal and the Costa Rican railroads. The dish is unique to the island, which its population, having left their homes in Africa, Europe, and Asia, were forced to use the limited amount of goods (for example, fish and coconut milk) that were widely available. Although most Jamaicans are of mixed African descent, the dish is not consumed on the African mainland nor on any other continent. It is now, however, consumed by small minorities on the island of Tobago as well as areas of South and Central America that have Jamaican expatriates.

Rondón is a Jamaican Patois anglicism of the words "run down", which describes the "runny" or "liquefied" nature of the sauce. The name could also originate from the manner in which the fish is thoroughly cooked until it falls apart, or "runs down".

== Preparation ==
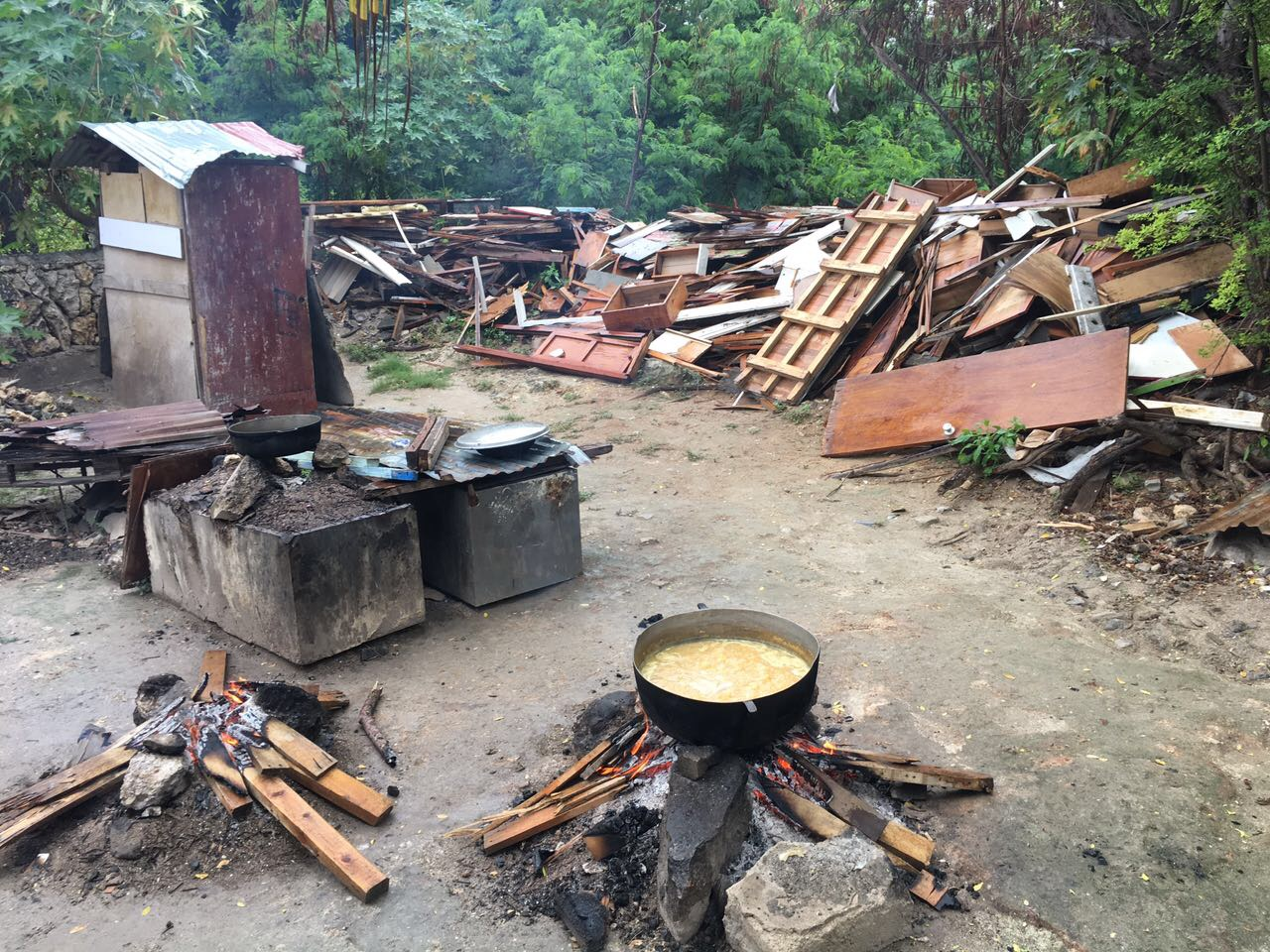
Preparation of rondón at San Andrés

The ingredients for the dish described as rondón vary from region to region, but coconut milk is always an essential ingredient.

In Nicaragua, the meat used might be fish, beef, pork or even turtle meat—a common ingredient in Caribbean cuisine but also illegal in some countries—to which seasonings are added. It might include bell peppers, onion, bananas, cassava, elephant's ear and argan. On the Caribbean coast of Costa Rica, the ingredients include cassava, taro, yam, plantain and green bananas. The meat might be fish, lobsters or crabs and spices such as thyme, garlic, onions and yellow lantern chilli or "chile panameño", an important ingredient in Costa Rican cuisine. It can be served with flour dumplings. On the Colombian isle of San Andrés, the ingredients used are fish, snails, other seafood or pork. The vegetables include cassava, taro, plantain, potatoes and the spices used include basil, oregano, peppers, onion, garlic and poultry seasoning. In Panama, the seafood prepared with coconut milk can be served with rice, tostones or "patacones", and salad.

In coastal areas of Colombia, "rundown" refers to conch stew. This dish may be prepared with conch meat, salt pork, root vegetables, breadfruit and plantains cooked in coconut milk.

In Trinidad, Grenada, and Barbados, a similar dish that utilizes palm oil is referred to as "oil-down", usually prepared with salted beef or pork, breadfruit, palm oil and seasonings boiled in coconut milk until it thickens. This dish is similar to yumma, a Koongo dish.

== See also ==
- Cow cod soup
- Fish tea
- List of breakfast foods
- List of Jamaican dishes
- List of stews
- Mannish water
- Stew peas – a similar Jamaican stew
