= Fish tea =

Spicy soup in Caribbean cuisine

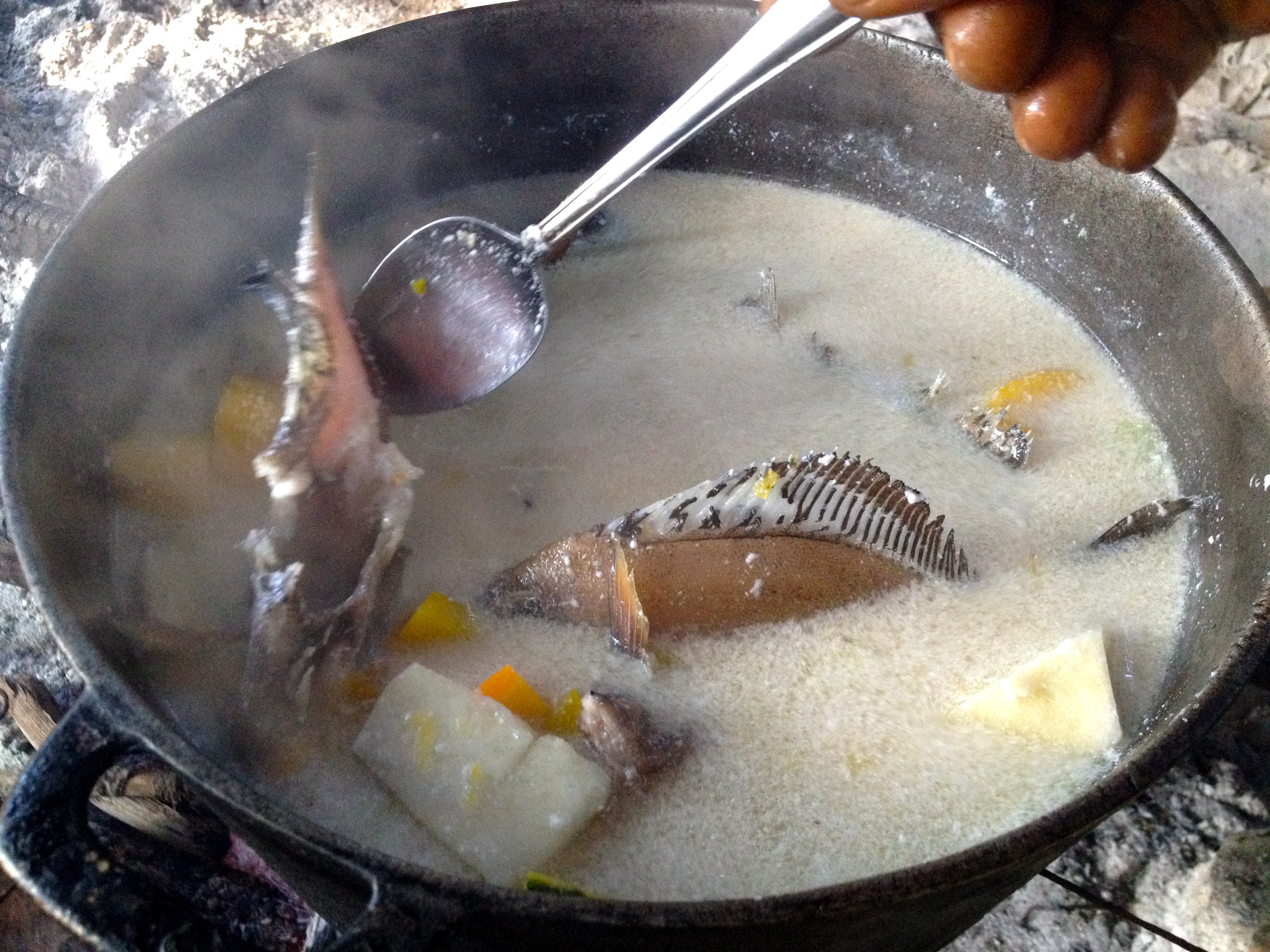
- Fish soup with reef fish and coconut milk
- Type: Soup
- Main ingredients: yam, pumpkin, cassava, potatoes, green bananas, coconut milk

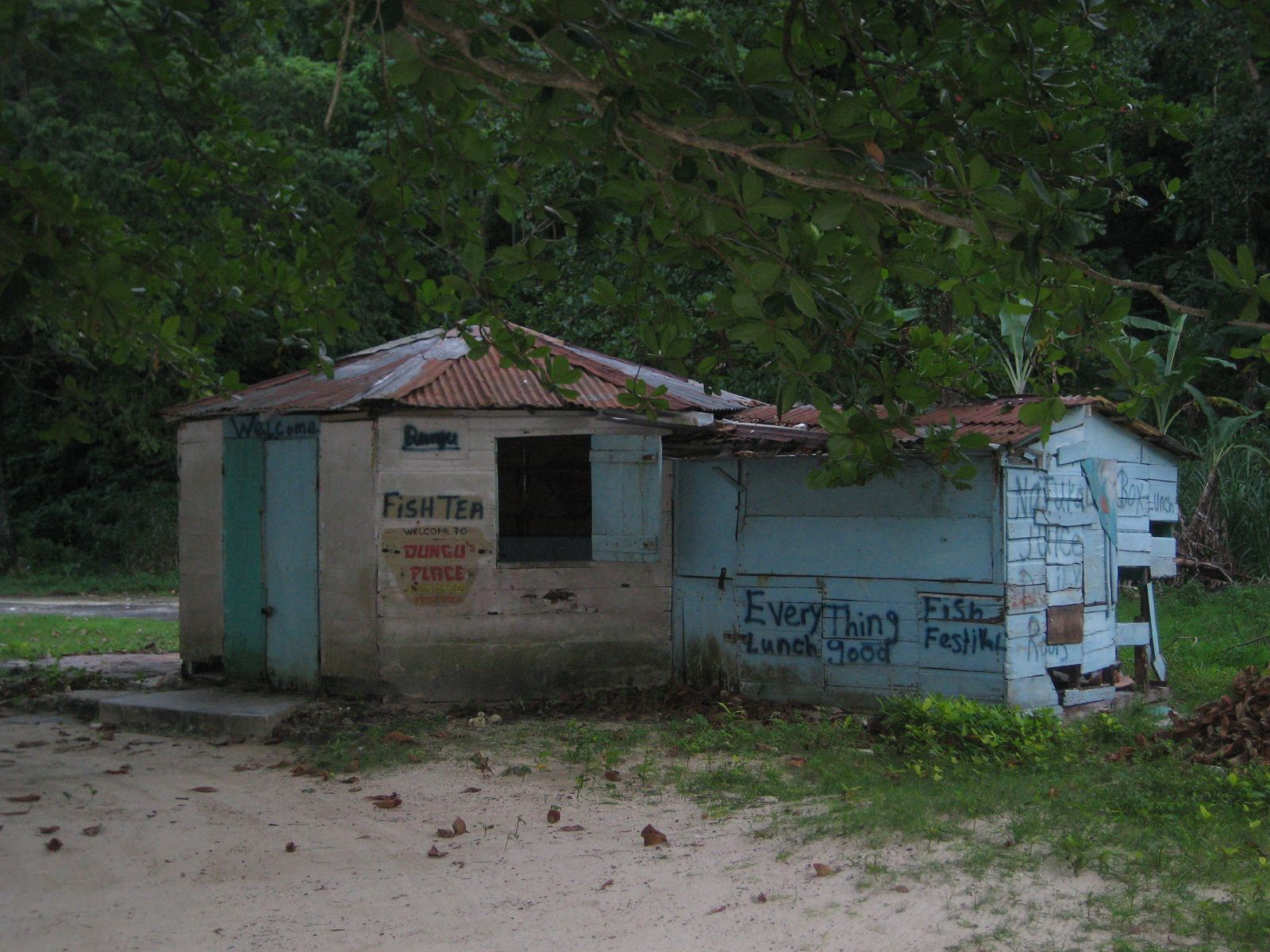
A fish tea shack at Winifred Beach in Port Antonio, Jamaica

Fish tea is a spicy soup in Caribbean cuisine and Jamaican cuisine. It is similar to a fish bouillon and can take several hours to prepare. It includes ground yam, pumpkin, cassava, potatoes and green bananas, cooked until very soft. As much as 15 pounds of fish is added to make five gallons. Carrots and cho–cho can also be added. It is flavored with coconut milk and seasoned with various ingredients that may include black pepper, salt, thyme, butter, scallion and season–all."

Fish tea is similar to traditional run down, but instead of chunks the ingredients are boiled until they are in a "soupy liquid form". Some believe it to be an aphrodisiac and it is associated with various legends and rumors:

- "If you drink that fish tea, you’ll have to chain yourself to the bed post at night or else you’ll walk all night" (in search of adventure)
- "Men who haven’t fathered children all of a sudden produced twins"
- "Once you take that fish tea you won't be able to walk a straight line."

According to a Cayman Islands publication "those who taste the fish tea always seem to come back for more."

== See also ==
- Run down
