= Stew peas =

Jamaican dish

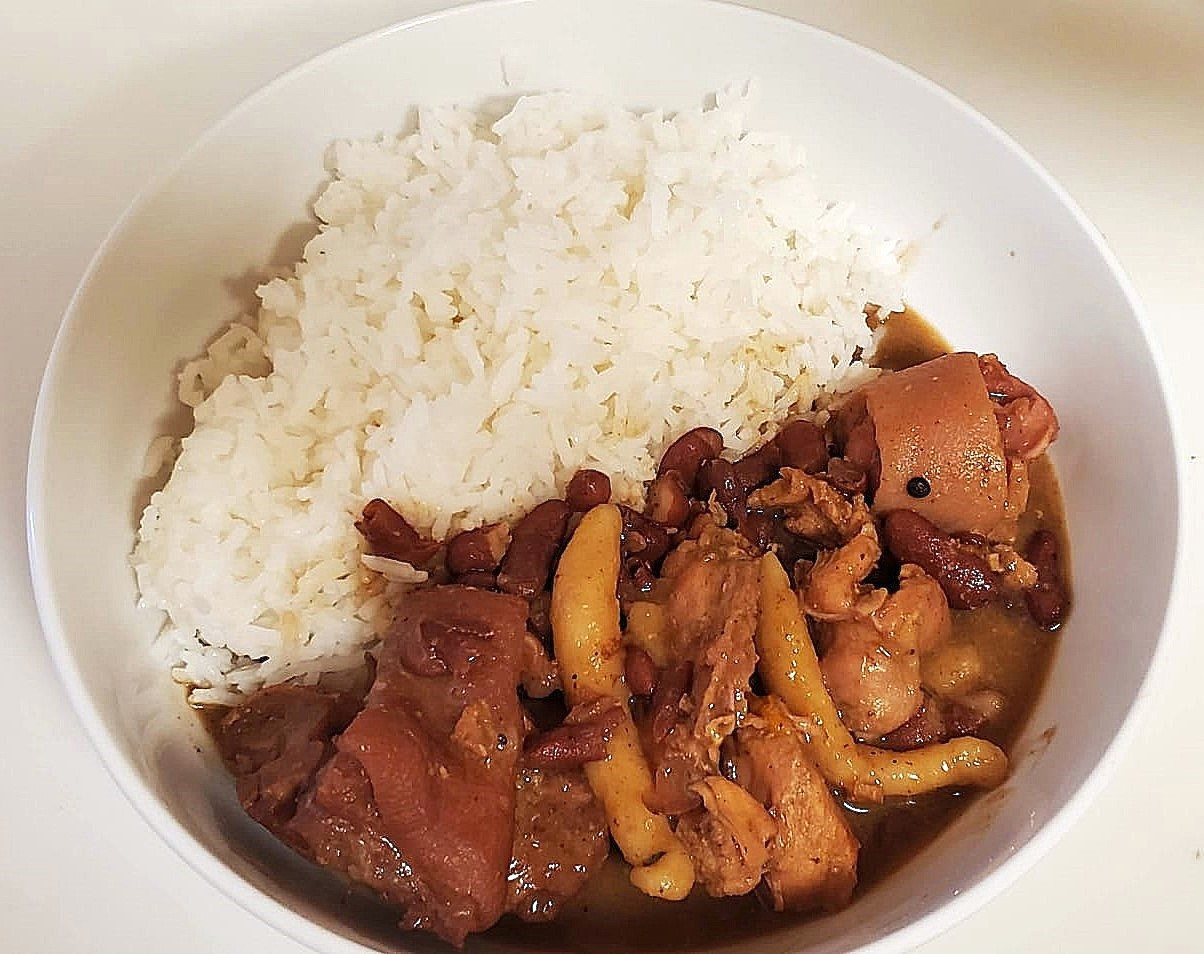
- Jamaican stew peas served with white rice
- Course: Main dish
- Place of origin: Jamaica
- Region or state: Caribbean
- Serving temperature: Hot
- Main ingredients: Kidney beans, cured meats, herbs/spices and coconut milk.

Stew peas is a Jamaican stew made with beans, salted meat, coconut milk, herbs and spices. It is a common dish in Jamaica, however a number of variations and similar dishes are made throughout the Americas. With legumes (beans/peas) and meats as its main ingredients, stew peas is a good source of protein.

== History ==
Stew peas originated in Jamaica, and is a Caribbean Creole dish created from a blend of cooking techniques and ingredients, influenced by various ethnic groups in the region.

The first Europeans to arrival in the Americas, the Spanish, introduced pigs, cattle and other livestock to Jamaica and the rest of the New World. Meats were primarily cured using the traditional Spanish method of salting/drying, and the Taíno method of smoking over a barbacoa, using pimento wood and berries for flavour and preservation. Many Jamaican dishes which include peas or beans, cured meats (salted pork, pickled pigtail and salted beef), and stews like brown stew and stew peas, were contributed by them. Other ingredients including herbs and spices like onion, garlic and thyme were also introduced by the Spanish.

Kidney beans which are typically used in Jamaican stew peas, originated in Peru around 8,000 B.C., and cultivars were dispersed throughout the Americas by Indigenous Amerindian tribes, like the Arawaks, and later by the Spanish and Portuguese, who introduced them to other regions through the Columbian Exchange. Also, the Arawaks cultivated pimento and peppers including Scotch bonnet and cayenne peppers, which they cooked with.

During slavery and indentureship, the Africans also influenced the dish by blending bold flavours and occasionally using pigeon and cowpeas. Pigeon peas (also known as Congo or Angola peas), which originated in India and were domesticated there 3500 years ago, were introduced from Africa by the Spanish and Portuguese. The use of scallion was influenced by Chinese indentured labourers, but was introduced to the island by the indentured East Indians.

Stew peas has been a staple dish in Jamaica since at least the 1940s, and recipes for it began to appear in cookbooks in the 1970s. The dish is prepared in various unique ways by Jamaicans, and is a staple in Jamaican homes and restaurants due to its popularity. In September 1992, the Jamaican newspaper, The Gleaner, declared stew peas with rice as "the best dish made in Jamaica" (in its Home, Living and Food Guide).

== Preparation ==
Jamaican stew peas is prepared using kidney beans (red peas) and other similar cultivars like round red, or pigeon peas (also called gungo peas), coconut milk and meats, especially beef chuck, salted meats such as pork and beef. Pigtail is often included, and chicken is sometimes used instead of pork or beef. Additional ingredients include onion, garlic, escallion, Scotch bonnet peppers, herbs and spices. The beans also serve to thicken the stew. Pinto beans and other similar varieties are more commonly used in the Spanish-speaking Caribbean and Latin America. Canned beans can be used to prepare stew peas, and it may be cooked in a pressure cooker. The dish may be prepared without meat, referred to as ital stew peas. In Jamaica, stew peas often includes slender flour dumplings known as "spinners". The dish is usually served atop white rice or with a side dish of rice. The stew serves to moisten and complement the separately-prepared rice.

== Variations and similar dishes ==
Stew peas variations are made in other parts of the Caribbean, and there are many similar dishes across the Americas. Dishes made with beans and rice or bean stews are staples in Latin American cuisine. While some dishes are distinctly Latin American in origin, with shared regional history as well as Anglo/Afro-Antillean migration in contingents from Jamaica and some other Caribbean islands to coastal Central America (between the 17th and 20th centuries), some dishes bear similarities to Antillean variations.

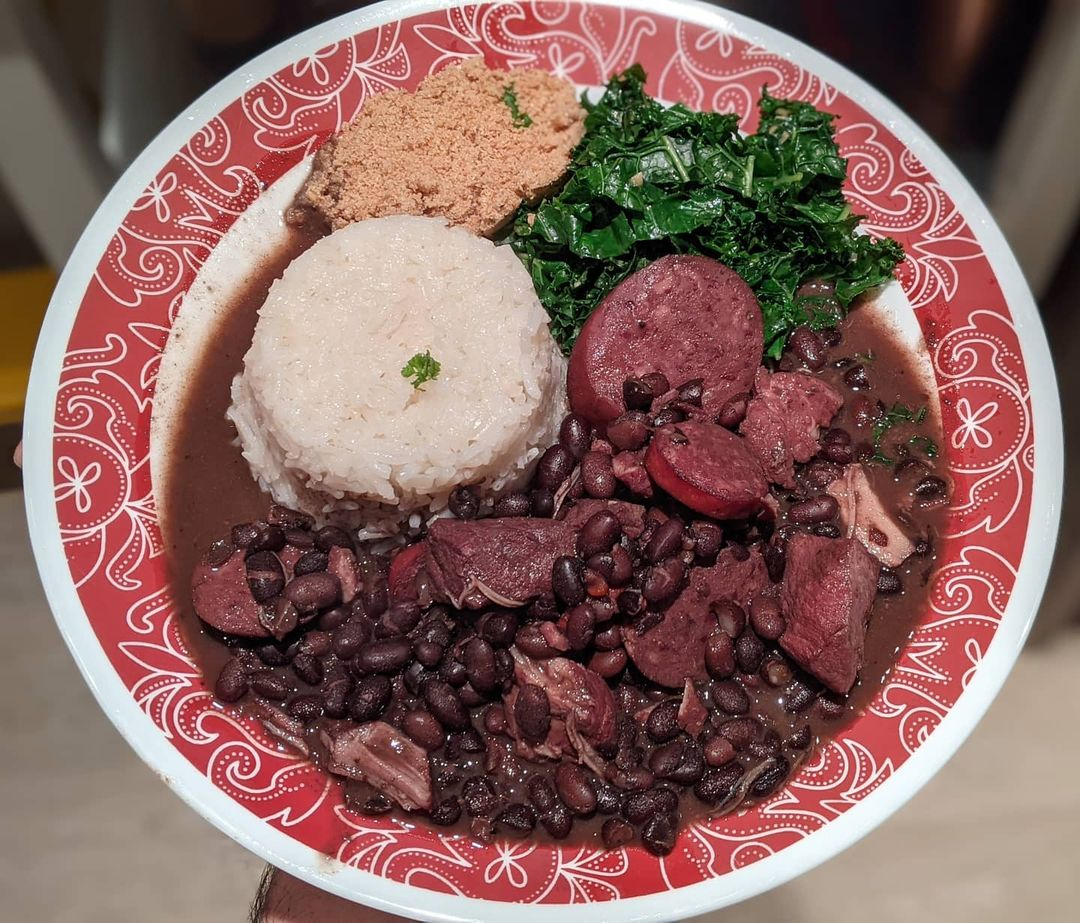
Feijoada made in Brazil

- Brazilian feijoada (bean stew) and arroz e feijão (rice and beans)
- San Andrés, Providencia and Santa Catalina frijoles con rabo de cerdo (beans with pigtail)— adopted from Jamaican descendants.
- Haitian sòs pwa (peas sauce)

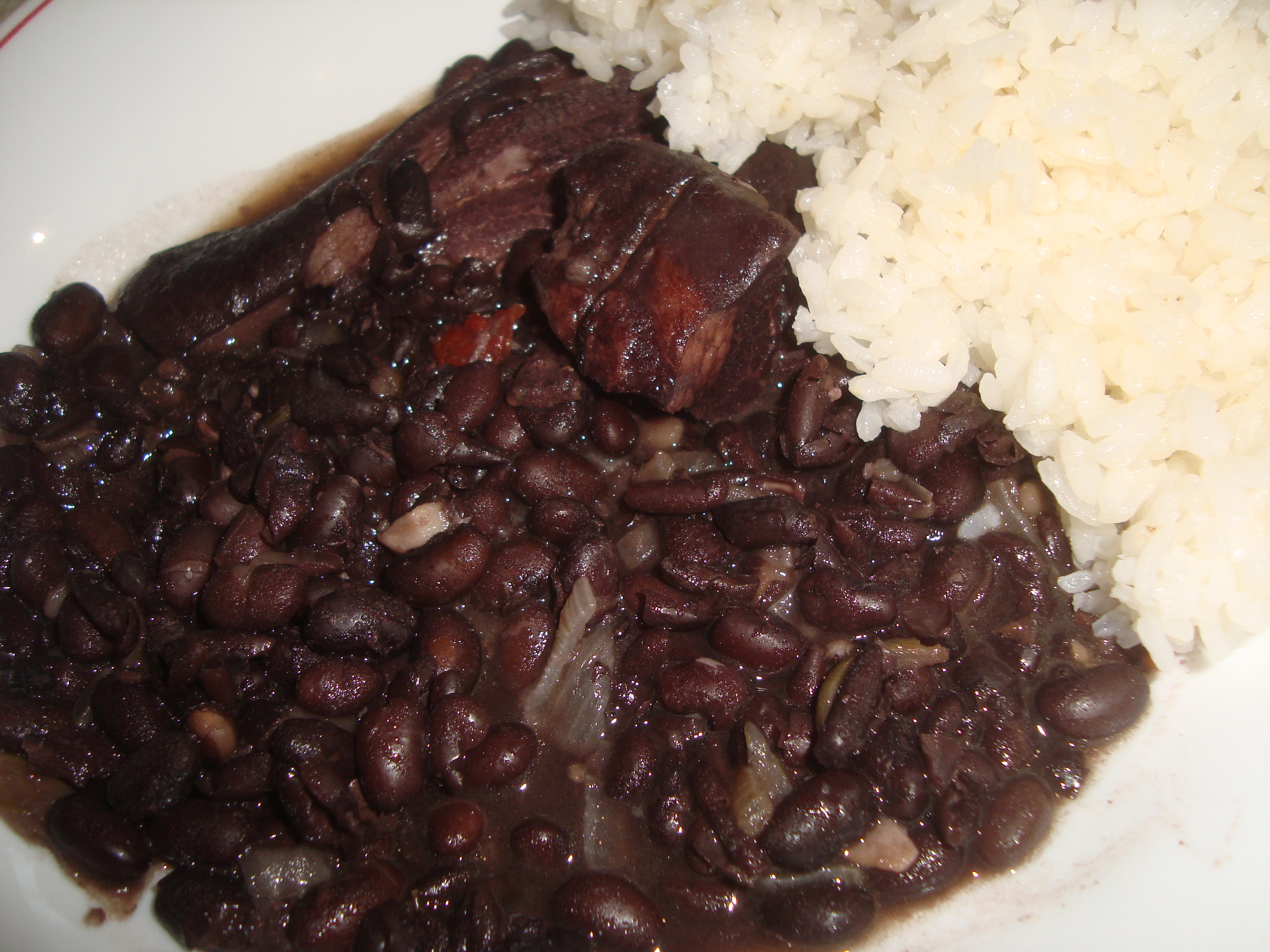
Frijoles negros con arroz blanco (black beans with white rice) made in Cuba

- Cuban frijoles negros (black beans)
- Dominican habichuelas guisadas (stewed beans)

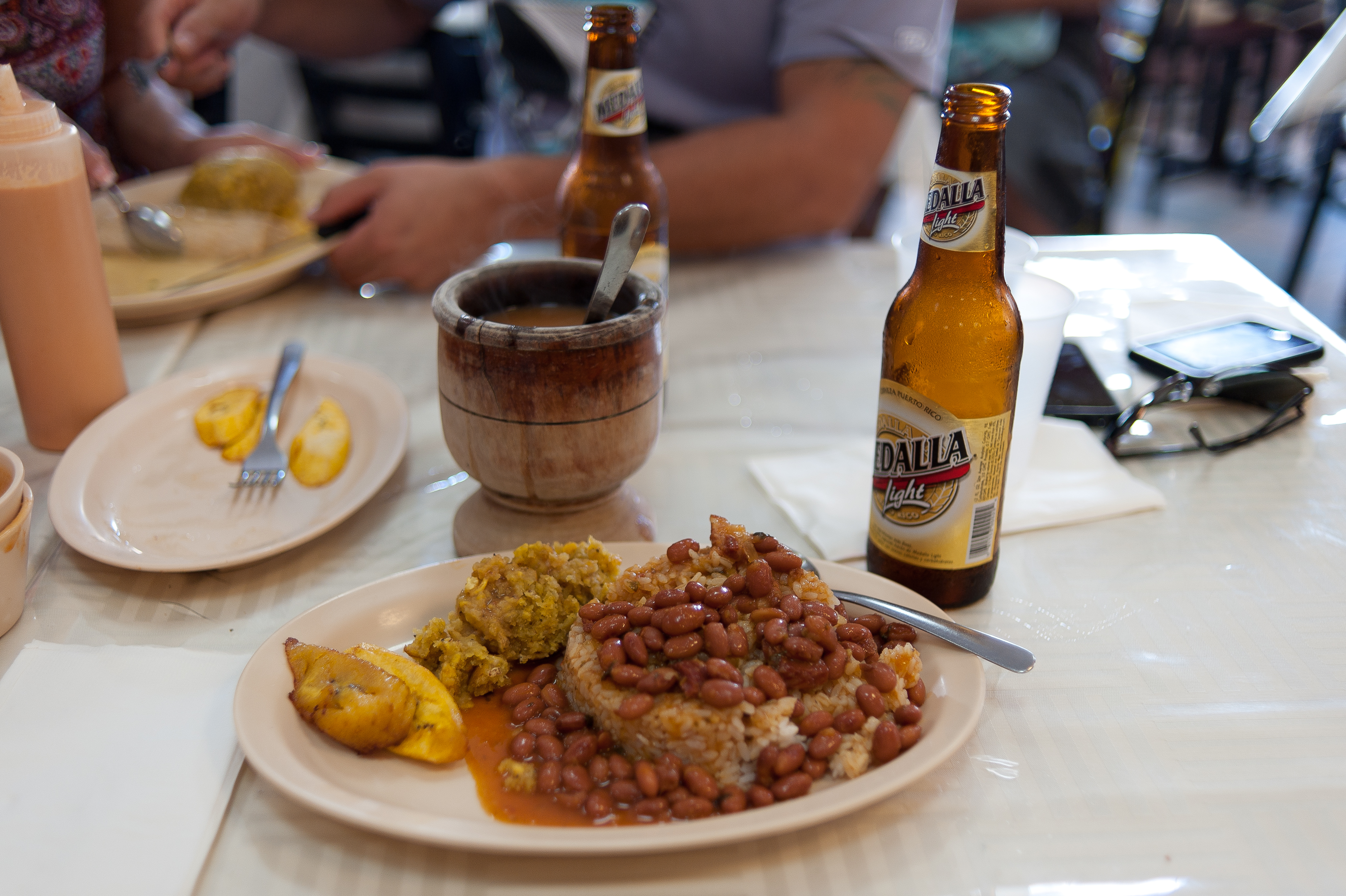
Puerto Rico's arroz con habichuelas guisadas (rice with stewed red beans)

- Puerto Rican arroz con habichuelas guisadas (rice with stewed beans) and frijoles negros (black beans)
- French Caribbean dombrés aux haricots rouges (shaded with red beans) and pois d’Angole (Angola peas / pigeon peas)
- Venezuelan pabellón criollo (Creole pavilion)
- Lesser Antillean stewed pigeon peas
- Costa Rican casado (rice with red / black beans)
- Honduran frijoles parados ("standing up beans" or red bean stew)
- Guatemalan, Colombian and Cuban et al frijoles colorados and frijoles rojos (coloured beans and red beans)
- Colombian frijolada (bean stew with cured meats)
- Panamanian frijoles guisados (stewed beans)
- Belizean stew beans
- Chilean arroz con porotos (rice with beans)
- Guyanese black-eyed peas stew
- Surinamese bruine bonen met rijst (brown beans with rice)
- Mexican stewed beans (various) and frijoles de la olla (beans from the pot)

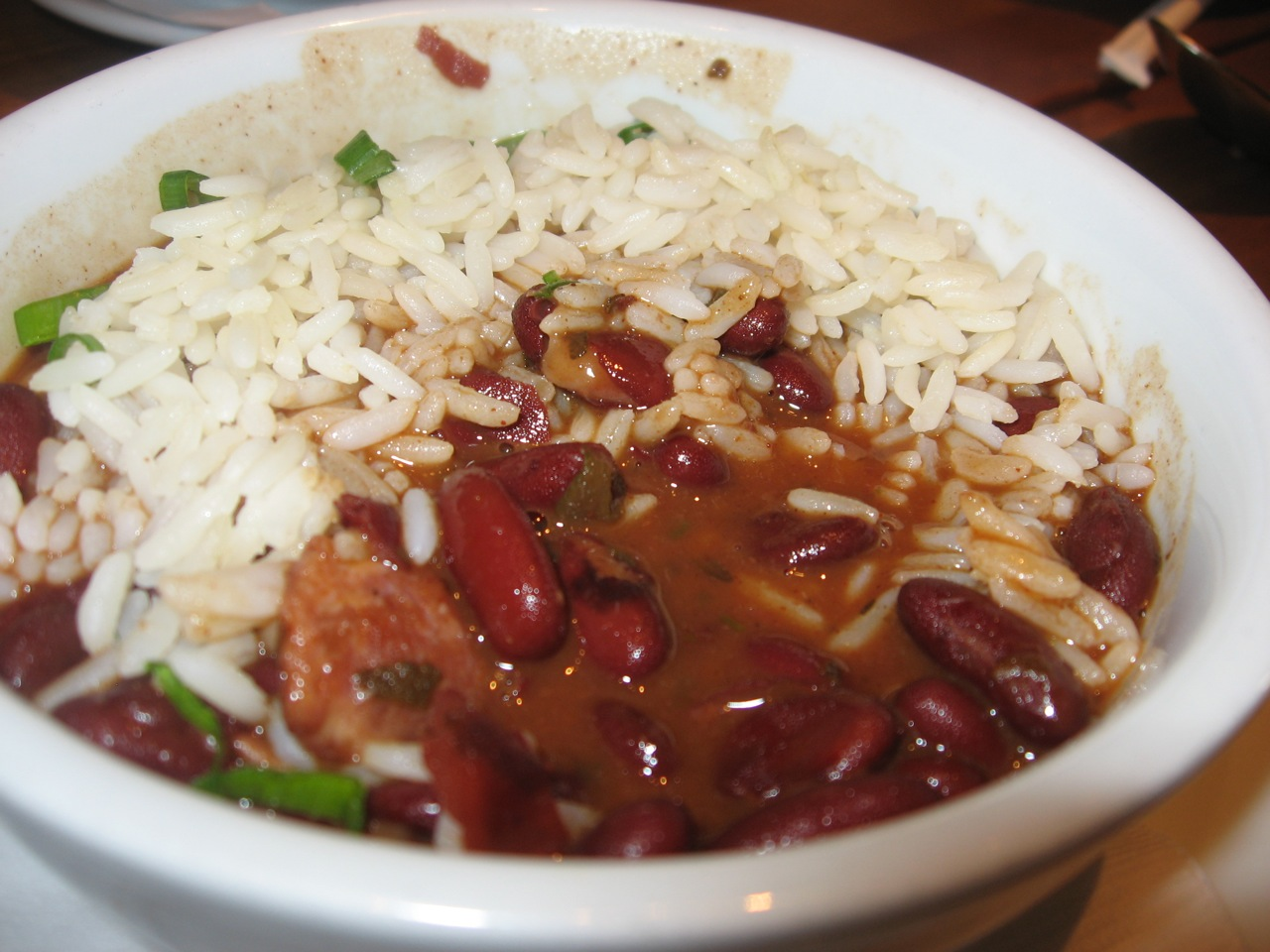
Red beans and rice made in Louisiana

- Louisiana Creole red beans and rice— influenced by Haitians who fled to New Orleans.
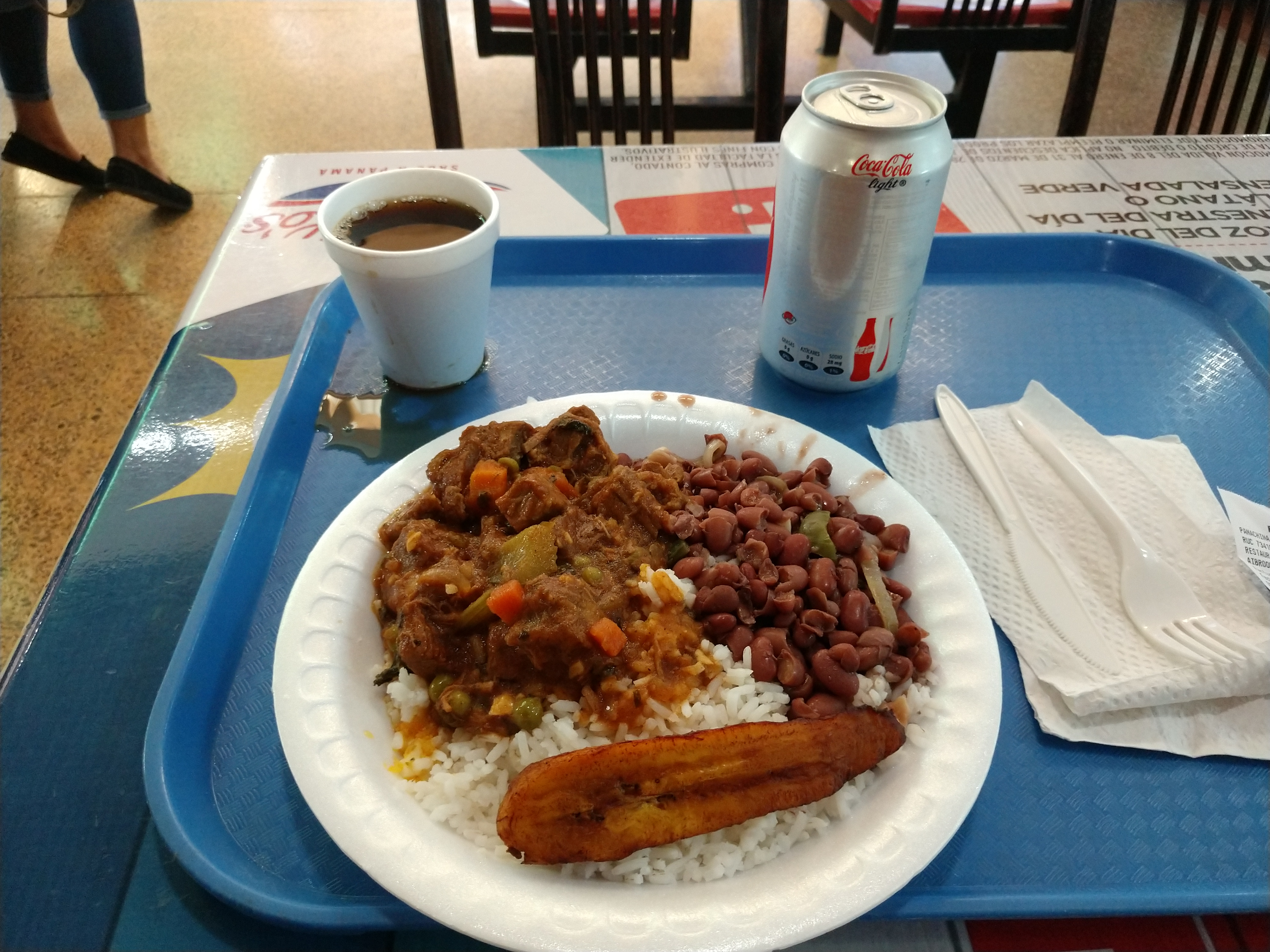
Rice and frijoles guisados (stewed beans) accompanied with ropa vieja and plantain, made in Panama

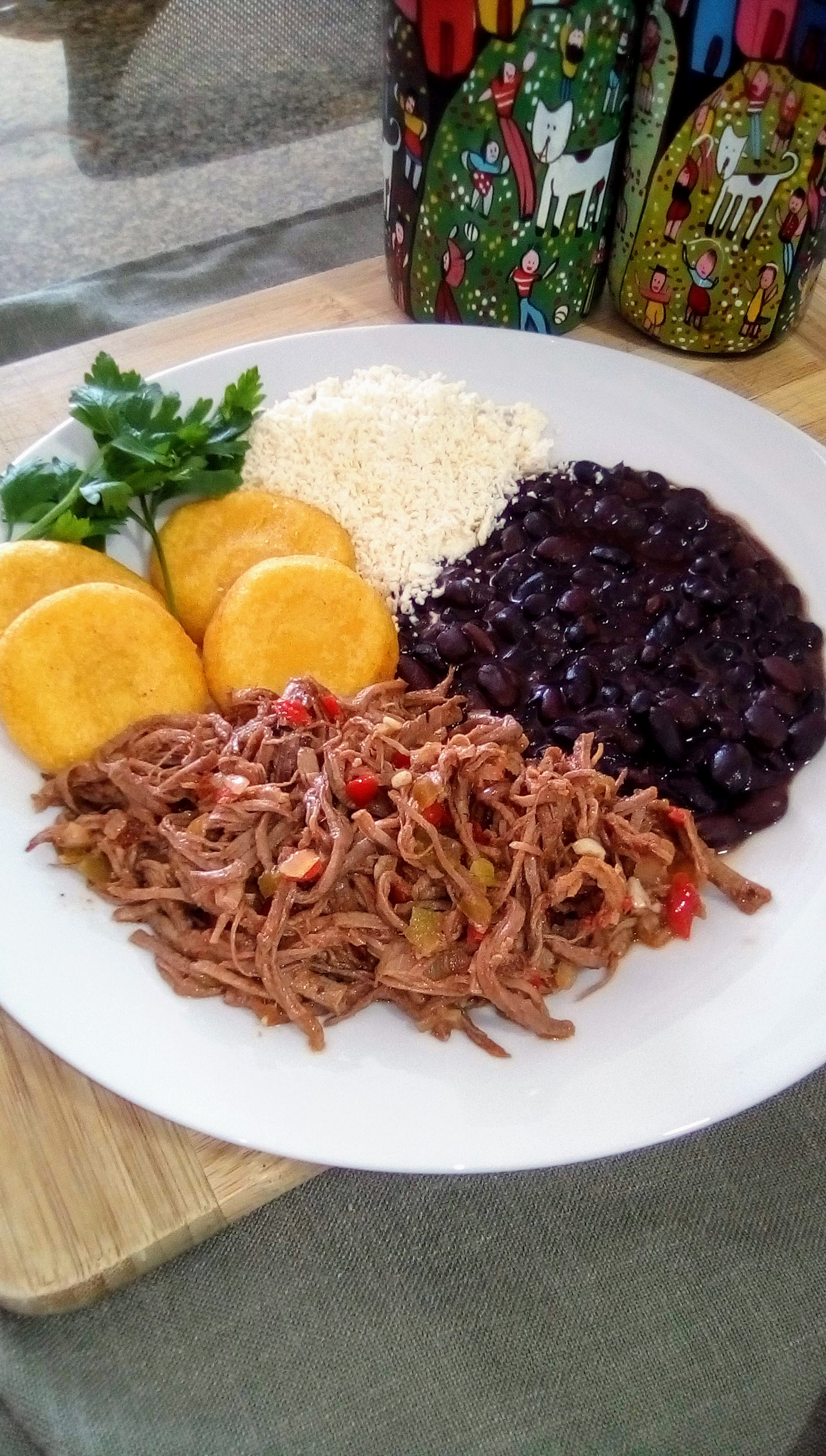
Pabellón criollo made in Venezuela (similar to Cuban ropa vieja and frijoles negros)

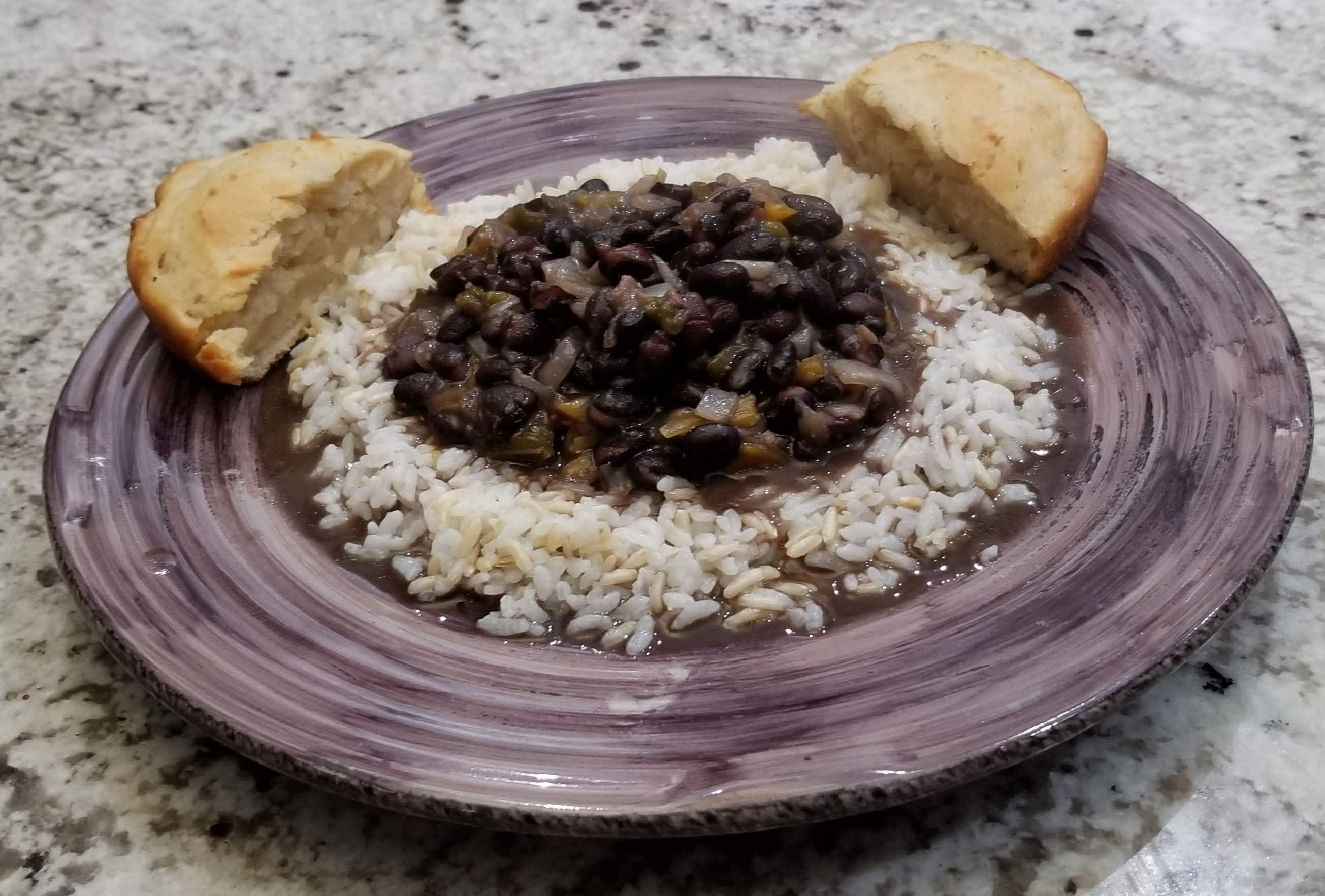
Frijoles negros made in Puerto Rico

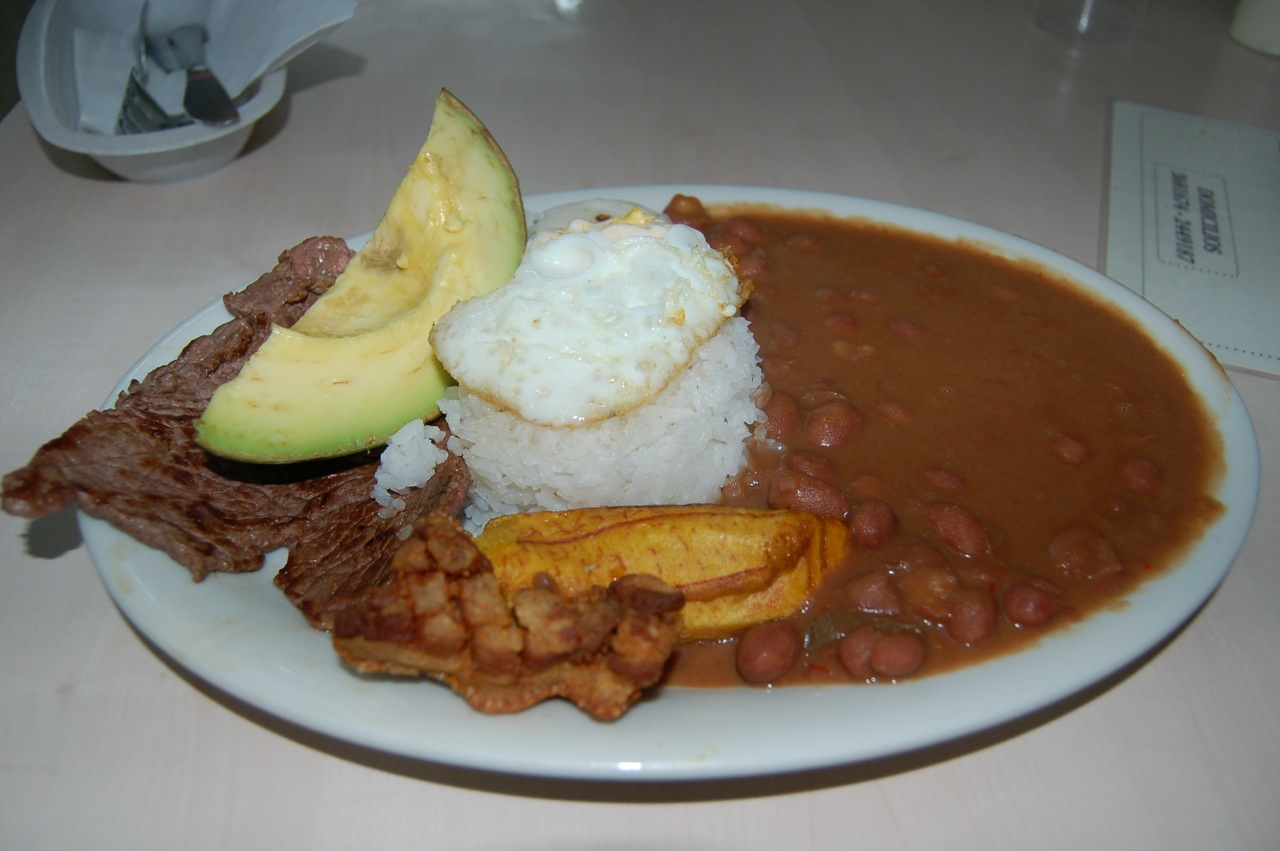
Colombia's national dish with frijoles rojos (red beans), served with rice and other accompaniments

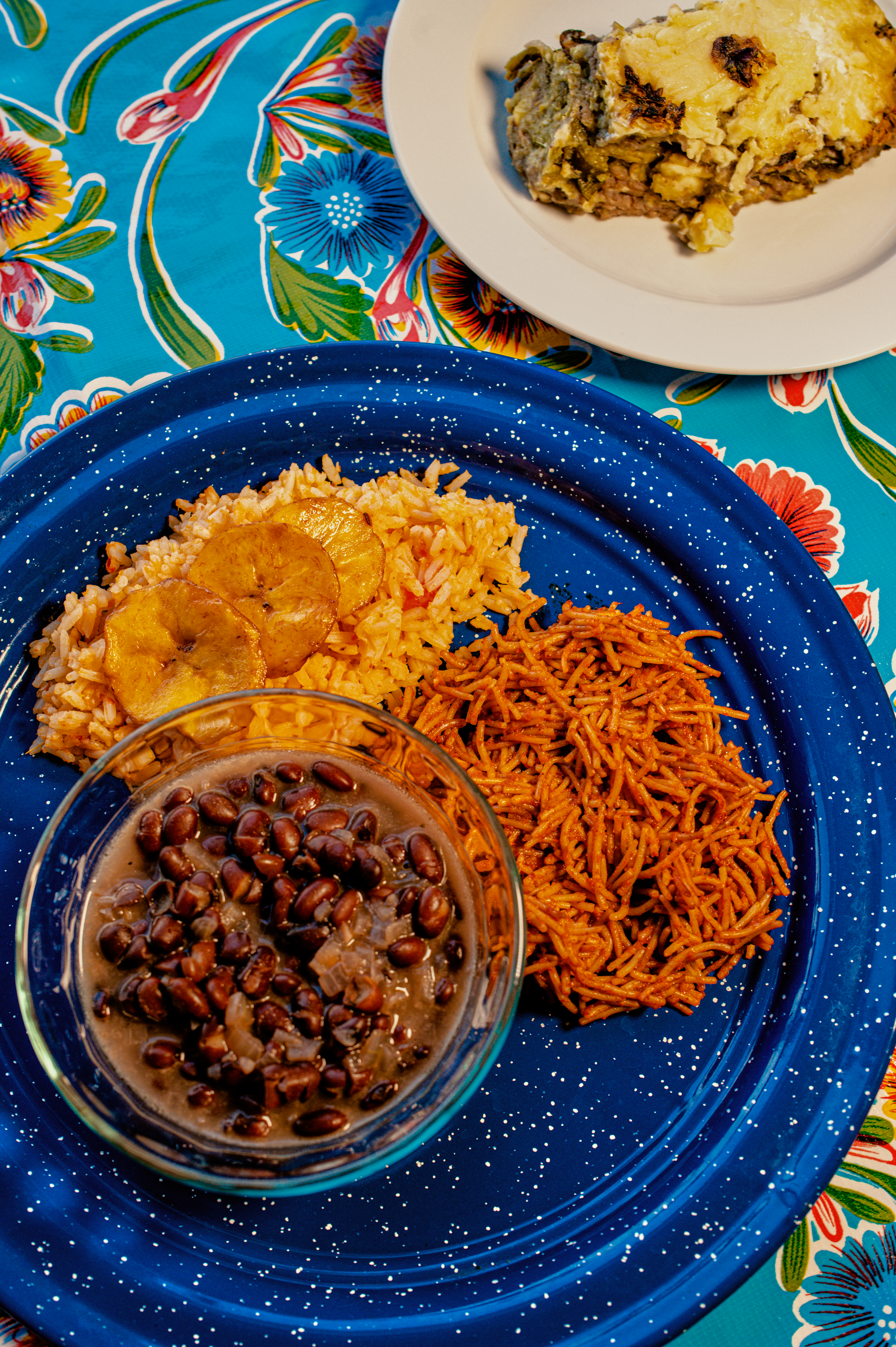
Mexican frijoles with other accompaniments

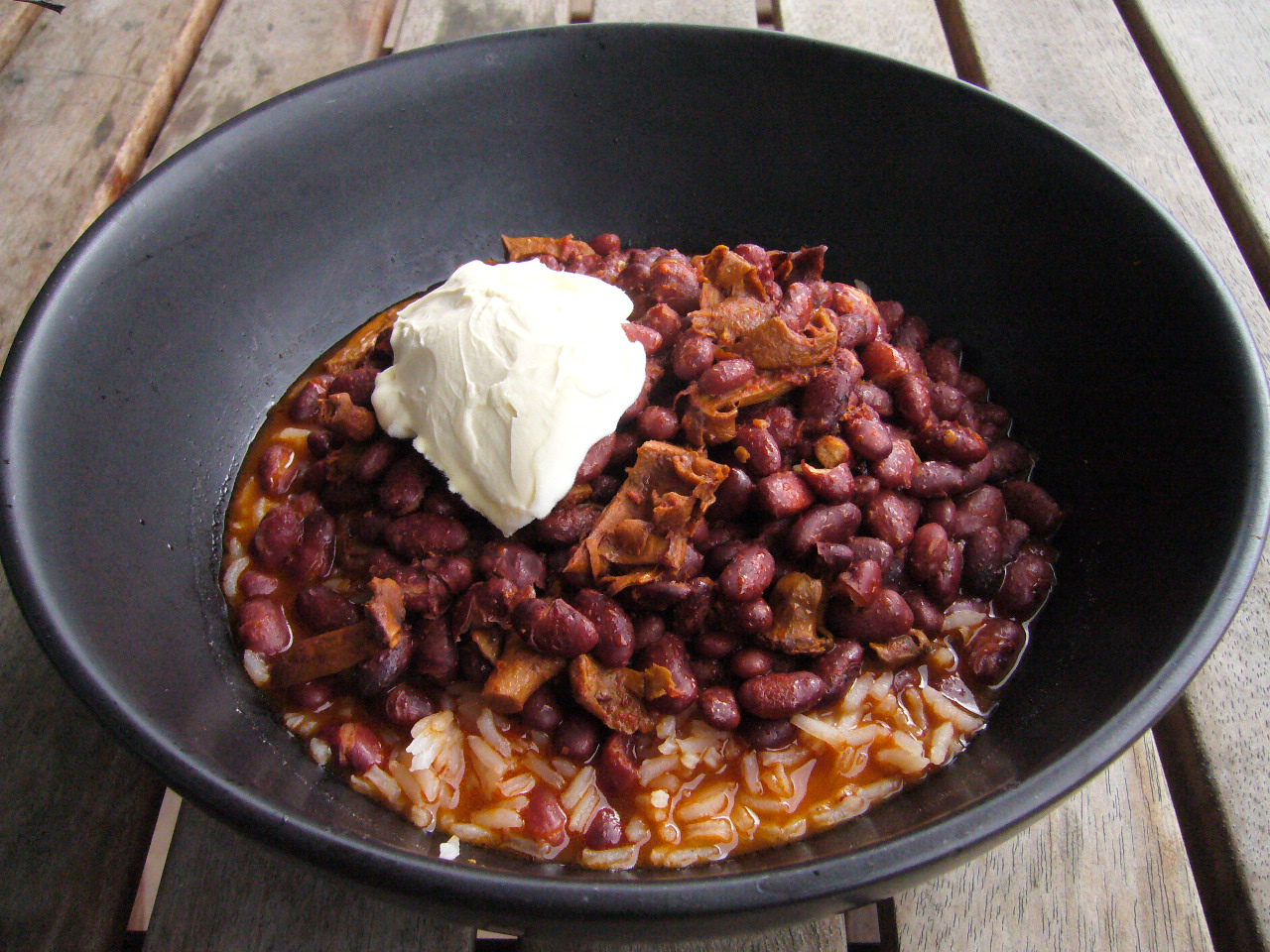
Guatemalan frijoles colorados with rice

== See also ==
- Jamaican cuisine
- List of Jamaican dishes and foods
- Red peas soup
- Rice and peas
- Run down
