= Calulu =

Dish from Lusophone Africa with fish, chicken, palm oil and vegetables

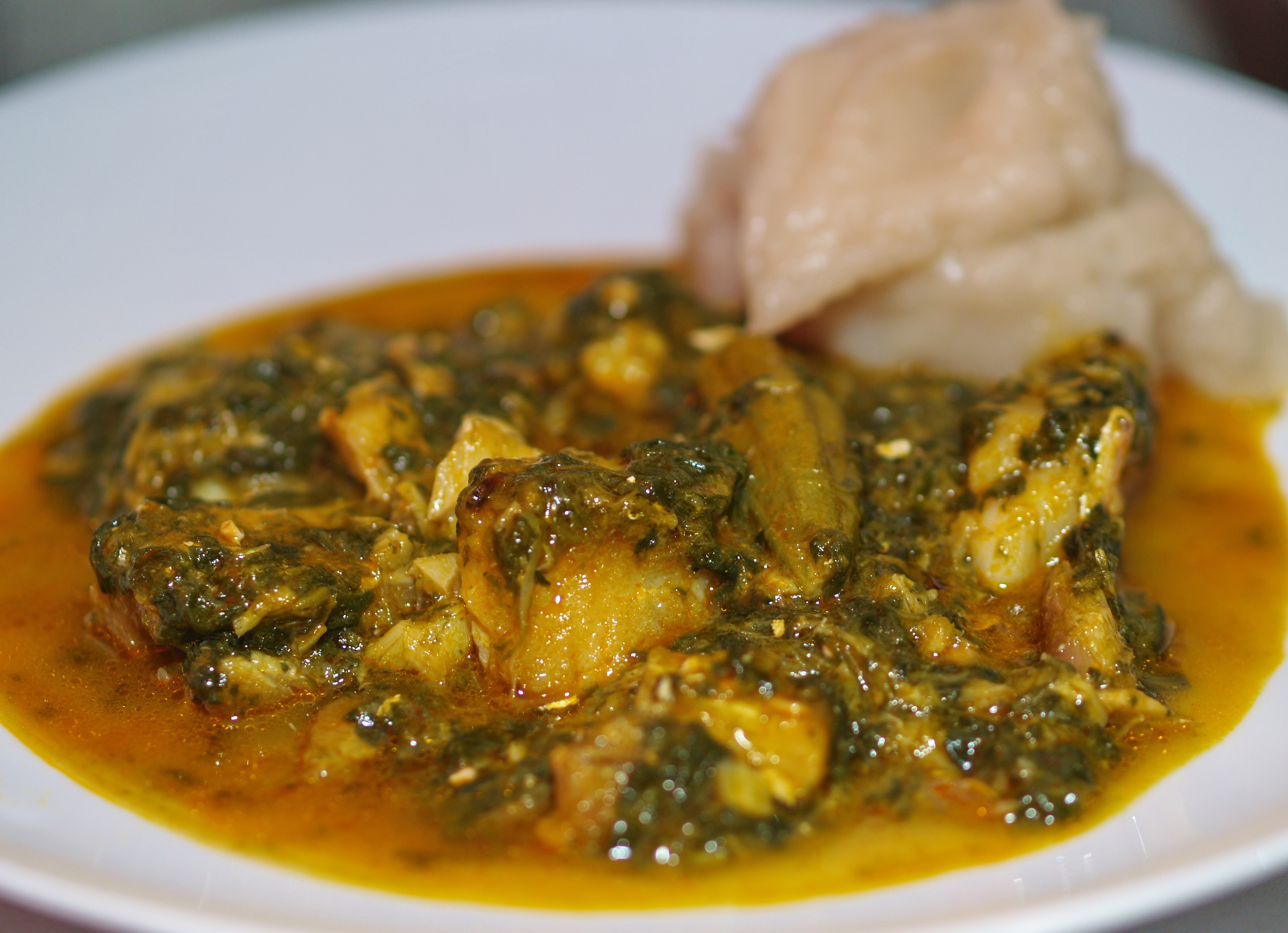
- Type: Stew
- Place of origin: Angola, São Tomé and Príncipe
- Food energy (per serving): c. 354

Calulu is a typical dish from Angola (Angolan cuisine) and São Tomé and Príncipe (Cuisine of São Tomé and Príncipe). Preparations of it can include fish or meat.

== Origin ==
In Angola, calulu is the name given by the Bakongo to the portion of food set aside at the end of a meal by women to leave for their husbands and is considered by many linguists to be the true origin of the word. However, certain references point to a non-African origin for the name of the dish.

Some dictionaries record the word "calalu" to refer to various vegetables, such as yam leaves. A similar dish is also found in Jamaica, called callaloo, which is made with indigenous amaranth. In Brazil, "caruru," a word derived from the Tupi-Guarani or Angola "caaruru," refers to a type of Amaranth endemic or native to South America, but also very popular in Africa. In this country, the dish called caruru is similar to the calulu of Angola.

On the other hand, this term appears to have Arawak origins and entered the European language through South American Spanish. Apparently, the plant (the yam, as well as the okra) was taken to the Americas by African slaves, but the name of both the plant and the food was imported from that region to West Africa.

== Fish calulu ==
Fish calulu is made with dried or fresh fish or dried meat. Other ingredients include tomatoes, garlic, okra, sweet potatoes, spinach, zucchini, and palm oil.

In Angola, fish calulu is prepared in a pan, alternating layers of dried and fresh fish with the other ingredients. It is cooked over medium heat and served with funge and beans with palm oil. In São Tomé and Príncipe, fish calulu can also be prepared with shrimp.

== Beef calulu ==
Beef calulu is prepared with previously soaked dried beef. It is also cooked over medium heat and served with funge and beans with palm oil.

== Tradition in São Tomé and Príncipe ==
In São Tomé and Príncipe, calulu is a common family meal and is also used at religious festivals, where it is often distributed near churches. It is also served at weddings and funeral ceremonies. It is locally considered a rich delicacy, suitable for offering to a stranger. The meats may be chicken, pork, including the chispe and head, or beef, including the mocotó. It is consumed throughout the country.

== See also ==
- Callaloo
- Caruru (food)
