= Pork tail =

Dish made from pig's tail

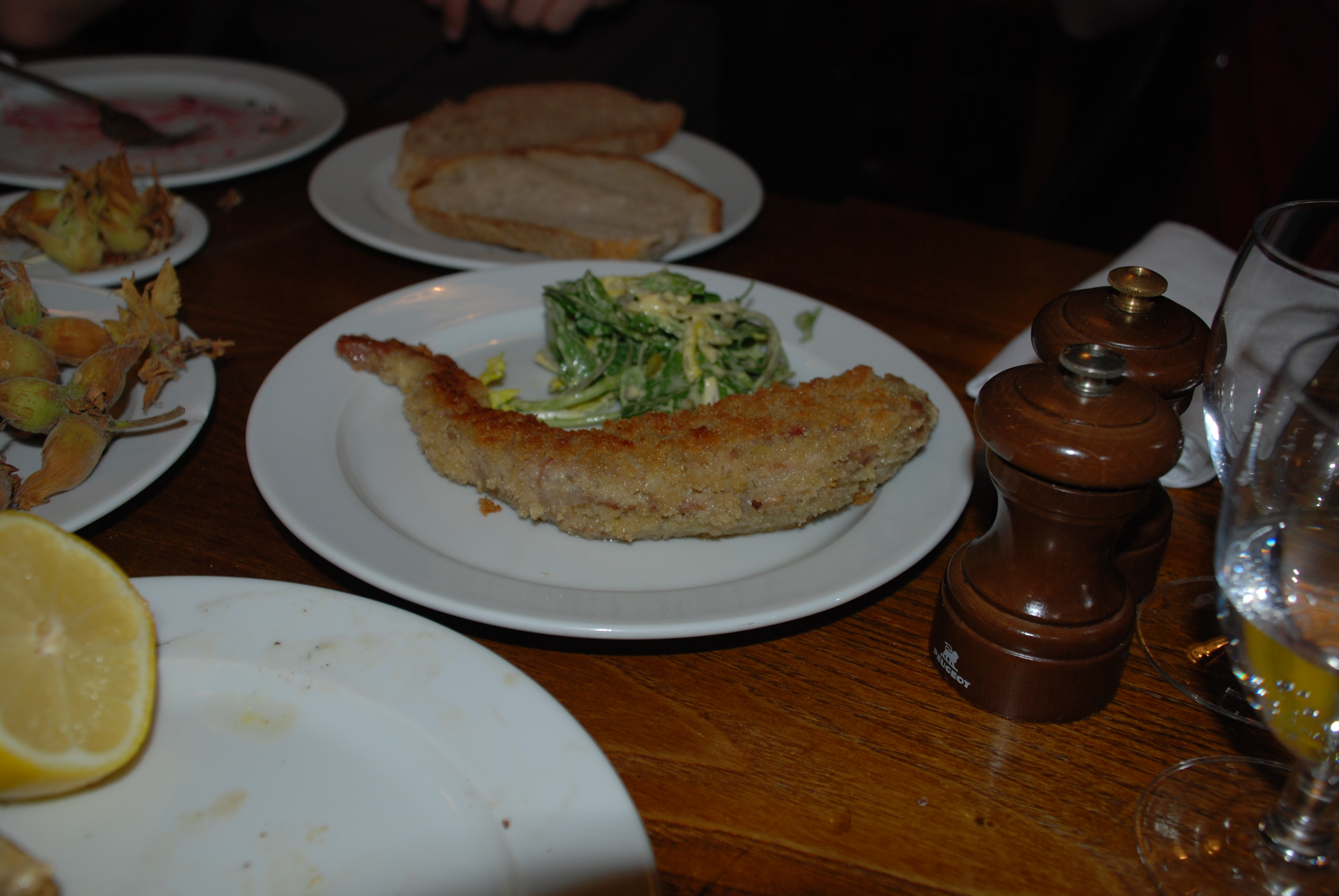
Fried pig tail

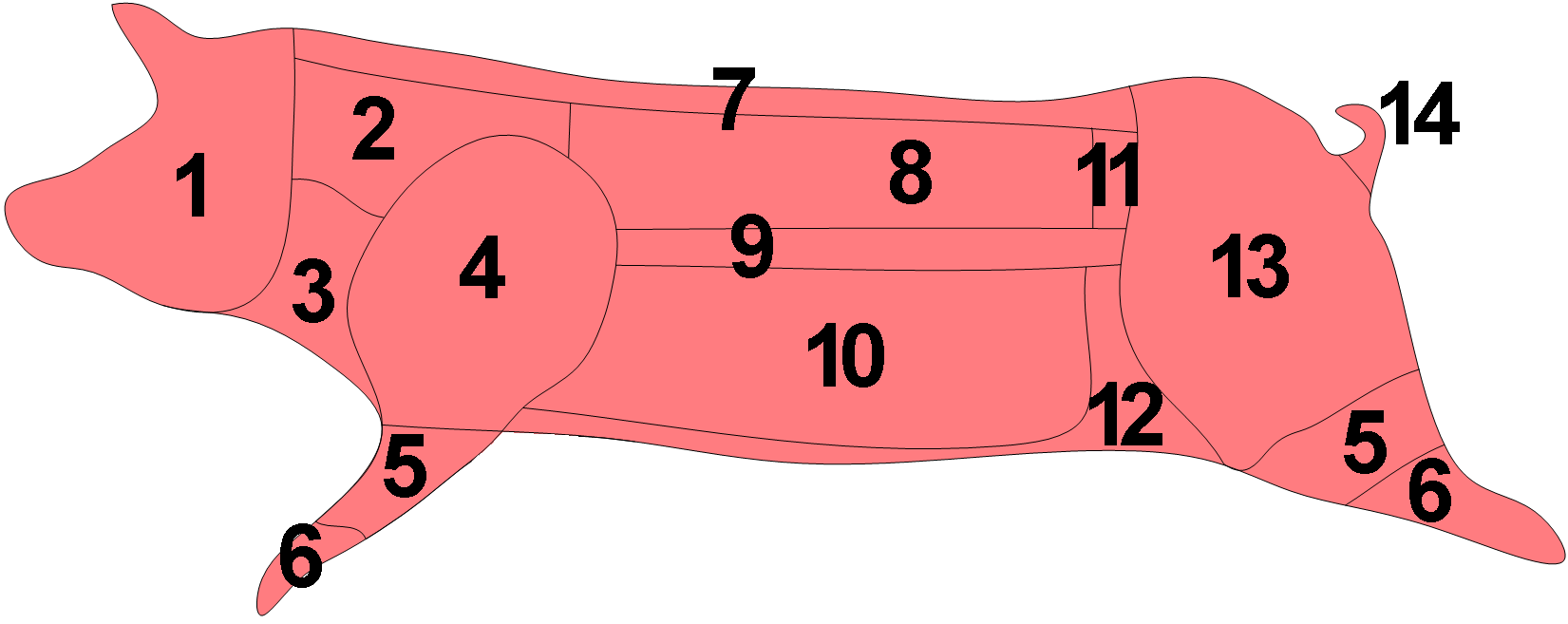
Cuts of pork including #14, pig tail, are pictured

Pig tail, also referred to as pigtail and pork tail, is the tail of a pig used as a food ingredient in many cuisines. Pig tails can be smoked, fried, or roasted in barbecue sauce.

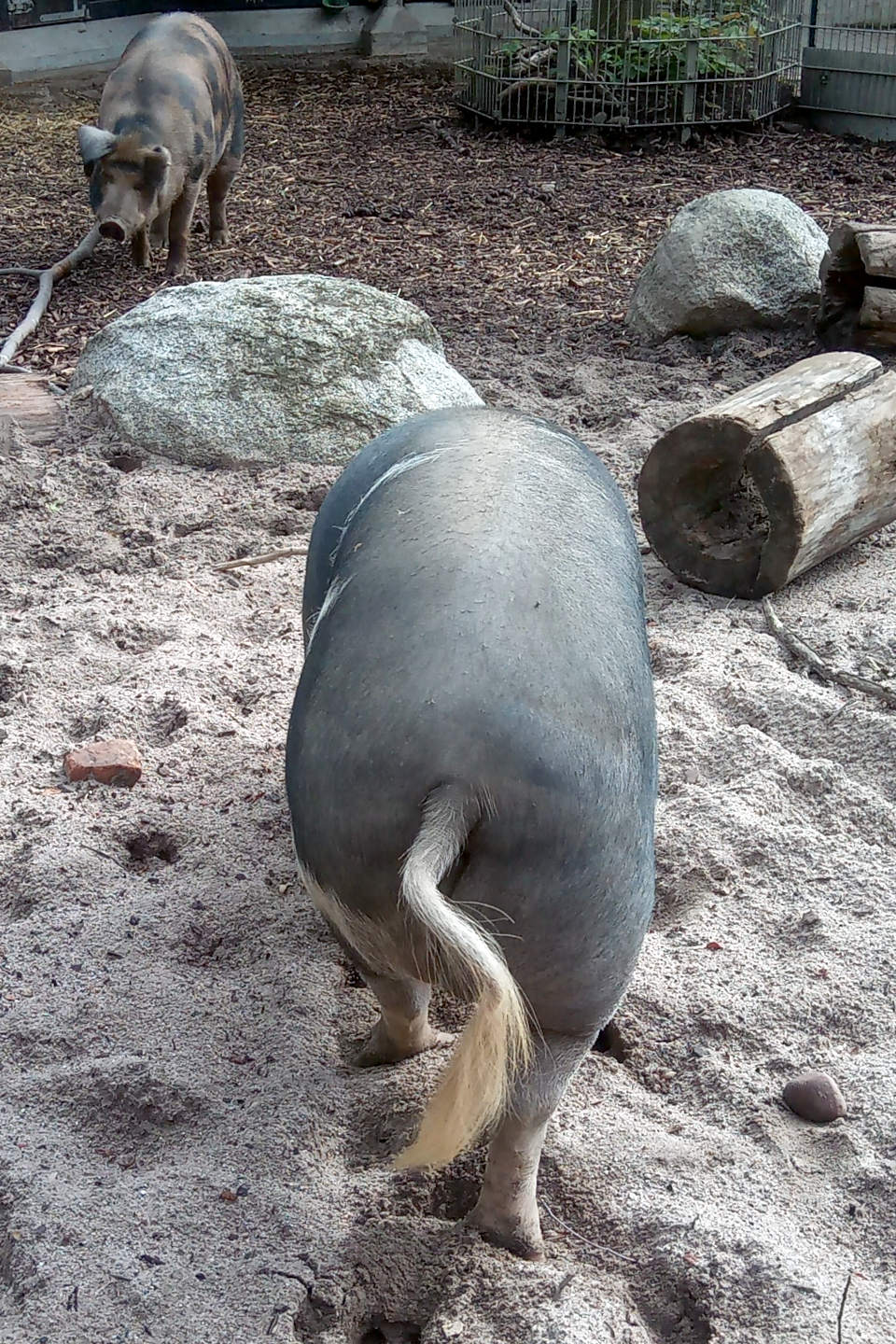
Tail of a Linderödssvin

They are also brine cured or used as jelly stock for brawn. Pig tails are used in the cuisine of the American South in various recipes with black-eyed peas, collard greens, red beans, and kalalloo.

In the Caribbean salted pig tails are used. In Guadeloupe pig tail is used to flavor stews and soups.

== See also ==
- List of smoked foods
