= Callaloo =

Caribbean vegetable dish

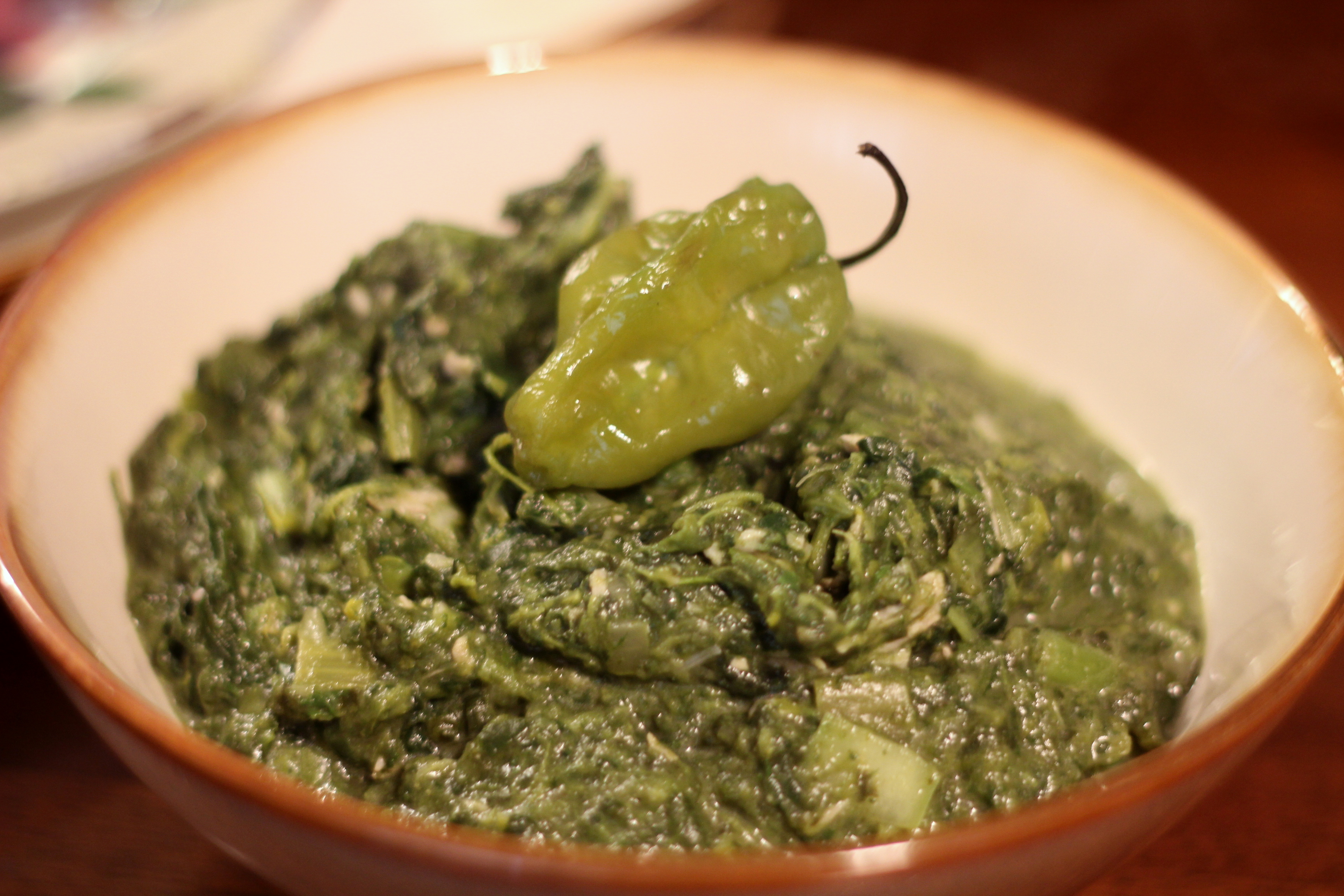
- Type: Stew
- Region or state: Caribbean
- Main ingredients: Leaf vegetable (usually taro, amaranth or Xanthosoma)

Callaloo (/ˌkæləˈluː/ KAL-ə-LOO, Jamaican Patois: [kalalu]; many spelling variants, such as kallaloo, calaloo, calalloo, calaloux, or callalloo) is a plant used in popular dishes in many Caribbean countries, while for other Caribbean countries, a stew made with the plant is called callaloo. Cuisines, including the plant callaloo or dishes called callaloo, vary throughout the Caribbean. In countries such as Trinidad and Tobago or Grenada, the dish itself is called callaloo and uses taro leaves (known by many local names such as 'dasheen bush', 'callaloo bush', or 'bush') or Xanthosoma leaves (known by many names, including cocoyam and tannia).

It is a remnant of West African and Taino cuisine.

== Etymology ==
There are two possible etymological origins for the word, with stronger claims for the first. The first etymology from on ground research states that it is from Kimbundu kalulú referring to okra, or an Angolan vegetable dish, similar to the present use of the word in Haitian Creole and São Tomean Portuguese. The other claim is deriving from Tupi caárurú, meaning thick leaf. The word has many different spellings. The Dictionary of Jamaican English has spellings including culilu, caliloo, calaloe, caleloe, colalue, callalu, and callalloo. The dictionary used calalu as its preferred spelling.

== Cooking variations ==
Trinbagonians, Grenadians, and Dominicans primarily use taro/dasheen bush for callaloo, although Dominicans also use water spinach. Jamaicans, Belizeans, St. Lucians, and Guyanese, on the other hand, use the name callaloo to refer to an indigenous variation of amaranth, and use it in a plethora of dishes and as a drink ("callaloo juice"). The "callaloo" made in Jamaica is different from the "callaloo" made in Trinidad and Tobago, Grenada, and the rest of the Caribbean in terms of the main ingredient (the leaf used) and other ingredients included.

In Trinidad and Tobago, callaloo was described in 1912 as a soup containing crab and okra, and in 1938 as a green soup made with tannia leaves, okra, and land crab.

Jamaicans tend to steam callaloo leaf with garlic, carrots, local powdered seasoning, tomatoes, salt, Scotch bonnet peppers, onions, scallions, thyme, sweet pepper, pimento, with or without salt fish or other meats and even in rice or their famous patty pastries. Trinidadians and Saint Lucians, however, use dasheen bush, okra, coconut milk, pumpkin, onions, bell peppers, local seasonings, and spices, along with crabs or pigtails.

"Callaloo" in Trinidad is found in a variety of dishes, including callaloo soup or "oil down". Callaloo is one of the national dishes of Trinidad and Tobago and Dominica, although this soup can be found all around the Caribbean as one of the regional cuisine's "foodie favorites".

== Plant sources for callaloo ==
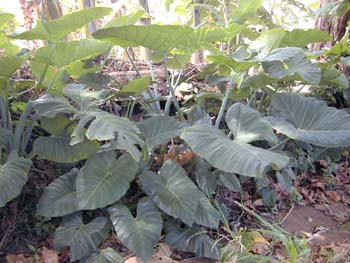
Xanthosoma

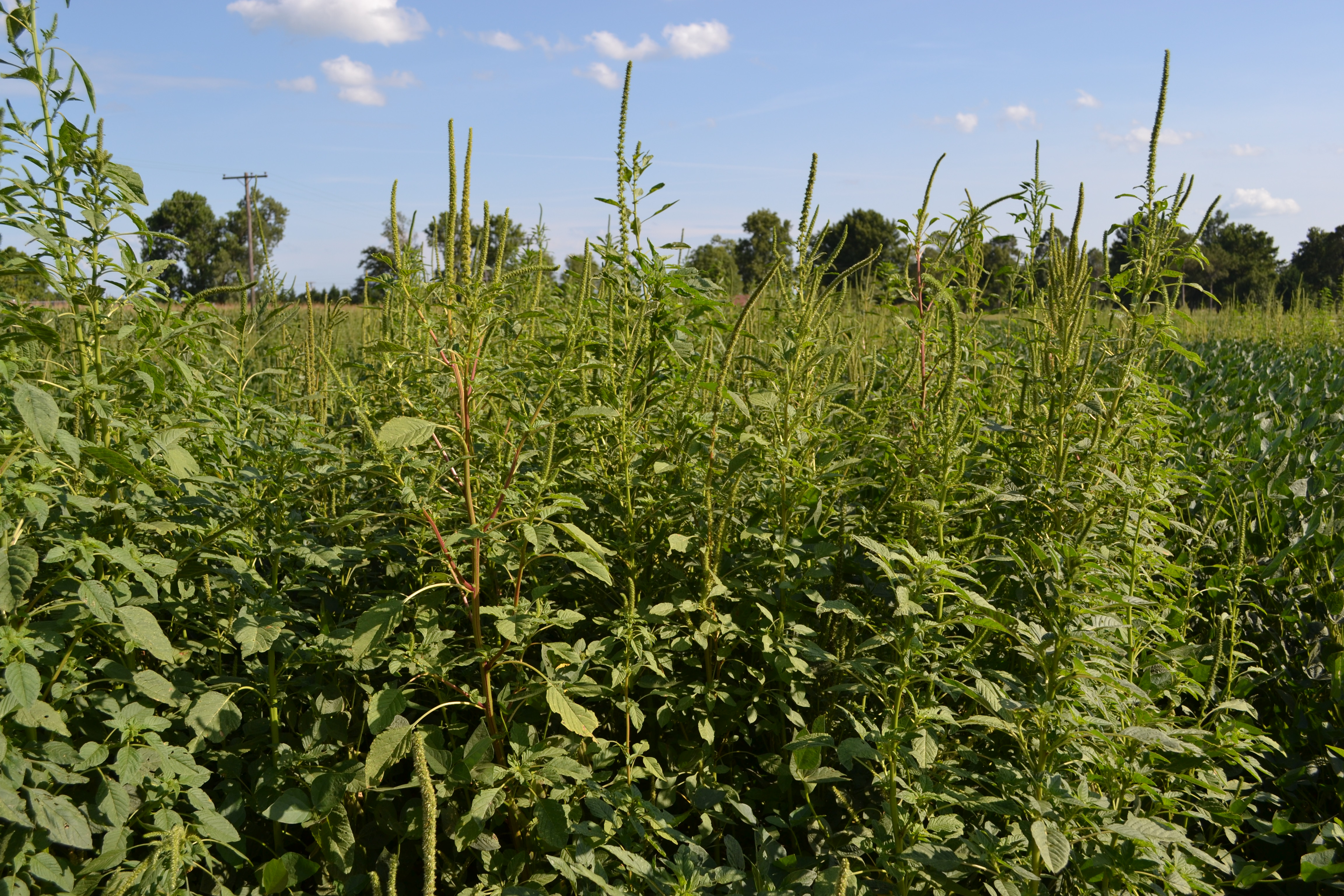
Amaranth

- Taro, also called dasheen in the West Indies, the leaves of this root crop are used in the Trinidadian version of the dish
- Tannia or malanga (Xanthosoma) also called calalu or "yautía" in Puerto Rico
- Amaranth species include Amaranthus spinosus used in the West Indies; Amaranthus flavus is a yellow variety used in Brazil and known as caruru; Amaranthus viridis in Jamaica; Amaranthus tricolor in the Caribbean
- Okra, where in Haiti the plant is called Kalalou. Often prepared in a beef stew dish called sos béf ak kalalou, or tomtom ak kalalou (breadfruit with kalalou).
- Pokeweed species, Phytolacca octandra or "West Indian foxglove" (no relation to garden foxglove, genus Digitalis)
- Nightshade species, Solanum americanum
- Water spinach (Ipomoea aquatica; a form of morning glory)

== Callaloo recipes ==
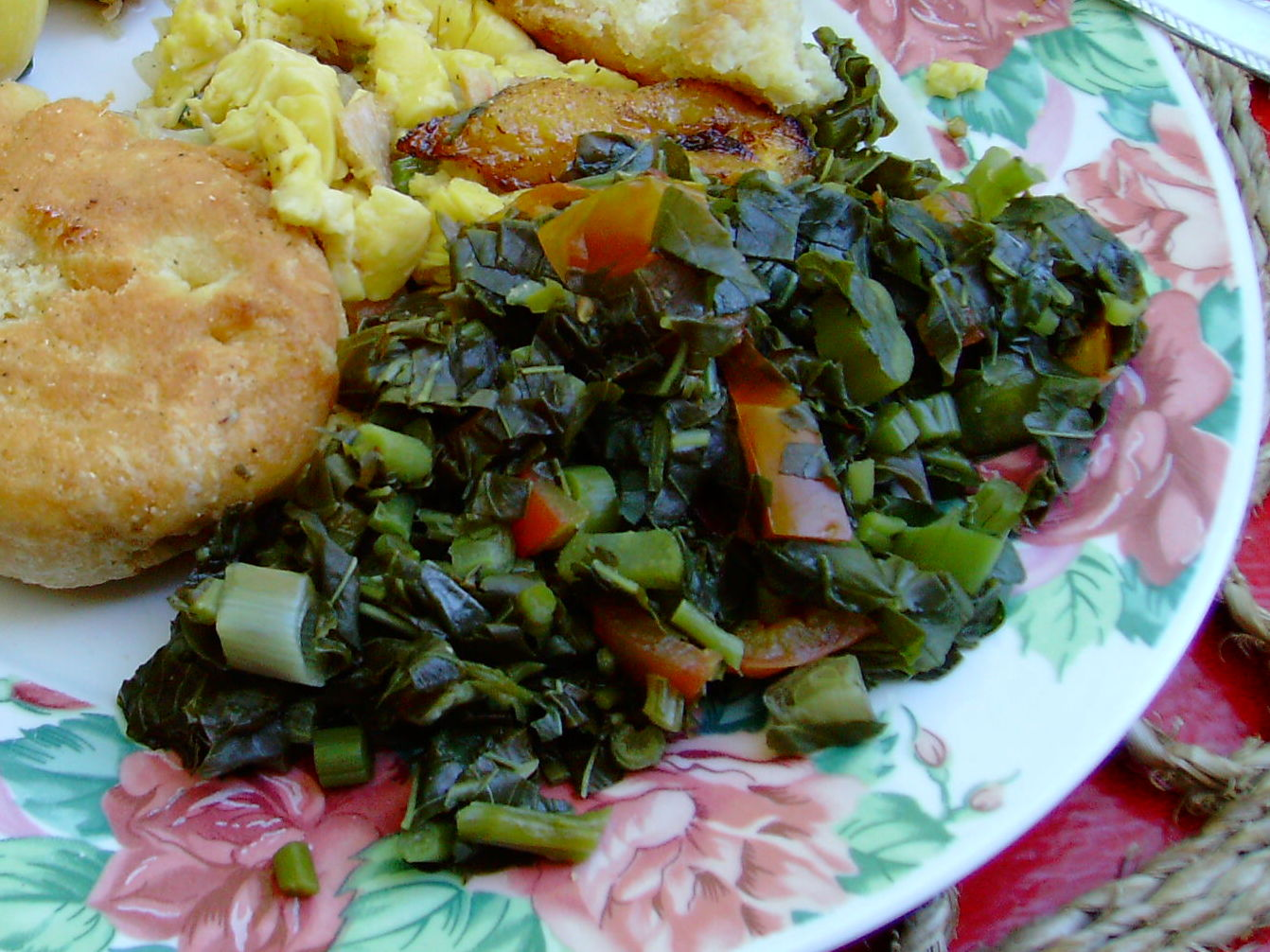
A Jamaican breakfast including callaloo (bottom right)

Callaloo in Trinidad and Tobago and other eastern Caribbean countries is generally made with okra and dasheen or water spinach Ipomoea aquatica. There are many variations of callaloo which may include coconut milk, crab, conch, Caribbean lobster, meats, pumpkin, chili peppers, and other seasonings such as chopped onions and garlic. The ingredients are added and simmered down to a somewhat stew-like consistency. When done, callaloo is dark green in colour and is served as a side dish which may be used as a gravy for other food.

Callaloo is widely known throughout the Caribbean and has a distinctively Caribbean origin, using indigenous (Xanthosoma) plants and modified with African influences, such as okra. (See palaver sauce for the West African dish.) Trinidadians have embraced this dish from their ancestors and over time have added ingredients such as coconut milk to modify its flavour. Callaloo is mostly served as a side dish; for Trinidadians, Bajans, and Grenadians it usually accompanies rice, macaroni pie, and a meat of choice. In Guyana it is made in various ways without okra.

In Jamaica, callaloo is often combined with saltfish or other meats, and is usually seasoned with garlic, carrots, local powdered seasoning, tomatoes, salt, scotch bonnet peppers, onions, scallions, thyme, sweet pepper, pimento and steamed. It is often eaten as a side dish with a full course meal, or as either breakfast or dinner with roasted breadfruit, boiled green bananas and dumplings, or bread. It is a popular and versatile dish that is even added to Jamaican patties, called vegetable/vegie/vagan patties, seasoned rice, as well as Fritters.

In Grenada, callaloo is steamed with garlic, onion and coconut milk and often eaten as a side dish. Grenadians also stir or blend the mixture until it has a smooth consistent texture. Callaloo soup comprising callaloo, okra (optional), dumplings, ground provision like yam, potato (sweet and "Irish") chicken and beef is traditionally eaten on Saturdays. It is also one of the most important ingredients in oil down, the island's national dish comprising steamed breadfruit, callaloo, dumplings, ground provision, carrot and several varieties of meat—salt fish, chicken, and pork. All of this is steamed in coconut milk and saffron powder. The ingredients in oil down are usually layered in a pot and cooked without stirring. Some recipes include crab or conch and others are prepared without meat.

In the Virgin Islands, callaloo is served with a dish of fungee on the side.

In Guadeloupe, calalou au crabe (crab callaloo) is a traditional Easter dish.

In St. Lucia, crab callaloo is also popular especially as part of the country's Creole day celebrations.

Martinique and Guadeloupe also have a variety served with Creole rice and salt cod salad.

A similar variation is the recipe called laing which is popular in the Philippines, mainly the Bicol region.

== In popular culture ==
The Costa Rican calypso musician Walter Ferguson has written a song celebrating callaloo’s flavour, popularity, and health effects.

== See also ==
- Calulu
- Caruru
- Laulau, similar native dishes from Polynesia
- List of Jamaican dishes
- List of stews
- Trinidad and Tobago cuisine
